= List of peers 1600–1609 =

This page lists all peers who held extant titles between 1600 and 1609.

== Peerage of England ==
Title	Holder	Date gained	Date lost	Notes
Duke of Cornwall (1337)	Henry Frederick Stuart	1603	1612	
Duke of York (1605)	Charles Stuart	1605	1625	New creation
Marquess of Winchester (1551)	William Paulet, 4th Marquess of Winchester	1598	1628	
Earl of Arundel (1138)	Thomas Howard, 21st Earl of Arundel	1604	1646	Restored, also as Earl of Surrey
Earl of Oxford (1142)	Edward de Vere, 17th Earl of Oxford	1562	1604	Died
Earl of Oxford (1142)	Henry de Vere, 18th Earl of Oxford	1604	1625	
Earl of Shrewsbury (1442)	Gilbert Talbot, 7th Earl of Shrewsbury	1590	1616	
Earl of Kent (1465)	Henry Grey, 6th Earl of Kent	1573	1615	
Earl of Derby (1485)	William Stanley, 6th Earl of Derby	1594	1642	
Earl of Worcester (1514)	Edward Somerset, 4th Earl of Worcester	1589	1628	
Earl of Cumberland (1525)	George Clifford, 3rd Earl of Cumberland	1570	1605	Died
Earl of Cumberland (1525)	Francis Clifford, 4th Earl of Cumberland	1605	1641	
Earl of Rutland (1525)	Roger Manners, 5th Earl of Rutland	1588	1612	
Earl of Huntington (1529)	George Hastings, 4th Earl of Huntingdon	1595	1604	Died
Earl of Huntington (1529)	Henry Hastings, 5th Earl of Huntingdon	1604	1643	
Earl of Sussex (1529)	Robert Radclyffe, 5th Earl of Sussex	1593	1629	
Earl of Bath (1536)	William Bourchier, 3rd Earl of Bath	1561	1623	
Earl of Southampton (1547)	Henry Wriothesley, 3rd Earl of Southampton	1581	1624	
Earl of Bedford (1550)	Edward Russell, 3rd Earl of Bedford	1585	1627	
Earl of Pembroke (1551)	Henry Herbert, 2nd Earl of Pembroke	1570	1601	Died
Earl of Pembroke (1551)	William Herbert, 3rd Earl of Pembroke	1601	1630	
Earl of Devon (1553)	William Courtenay, de jure 3rd Earl of Devon	1557	1630	
Earl of Northumberland (1557)	Henry Percy, 9th Earl of Northumberland	1585	1632	
Earl of Hertford (1559)	Edward Seymour, 1st Earl of Hertford	1559	1621	
Earl of Essex (1572)	Robert Devereux, 2nd Earl of Essex	1576	1601	Attainted and his honours became forfeited
Earl of Essex (1572)	Robert Devereux, 3rd Earl of Essex	1604	1646	Restored
Earl of Lincoln (1572)	Henry Clinton, 2nd Earl of Lincoln	1585	1616	
Earl of Nottingham (1596)	Charles Howard, 1st Earl of Nottingham	1596	1624	
Earl of Devonshire (1603)	Charles Blount, Earl of Devonshire	1603	1606	New creation; died, title extinct
Earl of Suffolk (1603)	Thomas Howard, 1st Earl of Suffolk	1603	1626	New creation
Earl of Dorset (1604)	Thomas Sackville, 1st Earl of Dorset	1604	1608	New creation; died
Earl of Dorset (1604)	Robert Sackville, 2nd Earl of Dorset	1608	1609	Died
Earl of Dorset (1604)	Richard Sackville, 3rd Earl of Dorset	1609	1624	
Earl of Northampton (1604)	Henry Howard, 1st Earl of Northampton	1604	1614	New creation
Earl of Exeter (1605)	Thomas Cecil, 1st Earl of Exeter	1605	1623	New creation
Earl of Montgomery (1605)	Philip Herbert, 1st Earl of Montgomery	1605	1649	New creation
Earl of Salisbury (1605)	Robert Cecil, 1st Earl of Salisbury	1605	1612	New creation; Viscount Cranborne in 1604, Baron Cecil of Essendon in 1603
Viscount Montagu (1554)	Anthony-Maria Browne, 2nd Viscount Montagu	1592	1629	
Viscount Howard of Bindon (1559)	Thomas Howard, 3rd Viscount Howard of Bindon	1590	1611	
Viscount Lisle (1605)	Robert Sidney, 1st Viscount Lisle	1605	1626	New creation; Baron Sydney in 1603
Baron de Ros (1264)	William Cecil, 17th Baron de Ros	1591	1618	
Baron le Despencer (1264)	Mary Fane, 3rd Baroness le Despenser	1604	1626	Abeyance terminated in her favour
Baron Grey de Wilton (1295)	Thomas Grey, 15th Baron Grey de Wilton	1593	1604	Attainted, and his honours became forfeited
Baron de Clifford (1299)	Anne Clifford, 14th Baroness de Clifford	1605	1676	Title previously held by the Earls of Cumberland
Baron Morley (1299)	Edward Parker, 12th Baron Morley	1577	1618	
Baron Zouche of Haryngworth (1308)	Edward la Zouche, 11th Baron Zouche	1569	1625	
Baron Audley of Heleigh (1313)	George Tuchet, 11th Baron Audley	1563	1617	
Baron Cobham of Kent (1313)	Henry Brooke, 11th Baron Cobham	1597	1603	Attainted and his honours became forfeited
Baron Willoughby de Eresby (1313)	Peregrine Bertie, 13th Baron Willoughby de Eresby	1580	1601	Died
Baron Willoughby de Eresby (1313)	Robert Bertie, 14th Baron Willoughby de Eresby	1601	1640	
Baron Dacre (1321)	Margaret Fiennes, 11th Baroness Dacre	1594	1612	
Baron Scrope of Bolton (1371)	Thomas Scrope, 10th Baron Scrope of Bolton	1591	1609	Died
Baron Scrope of Bolton (1371)	Emanuel Scrope, 11th Baron Scrope of Bolton	1609	1630	
Baron Bergavenny (1392)	Mary Fane, 7th Baroness Bergavenny	1585	1626	Succeeded to the more senior Barony le Despencer; Barony of Bergavenny held by her heirs until 1762, when it fell into abeyance
Baron Berkeley (1421)	Henry Berkeley, 7th Baron Berkeley	1534	1613	
Baron Dudley (1440)	Edward Sutton, 5th Baron Dudley	1586	1643	
Baron Saye and Sele (1447)	Richard Fiennes, 7th Baron Saye and Sele	1573	1613	
Baron Stourton (1448)	Edward Stourton, 10th Baron Stourton	1588	1633	
Baron Mountjoy (1465)	Charles Blount, 8th Baron Mountjoy	1594	1606	Created Earl of Devonshire in 1603, died, both titles extinct
Baron Willoughby de Broke (1491)	Fulke Greville, 4th Baron Willoughby de Broke	1562	1606	Died
Baron Willoughby de Broke (1491)	Fulke Greville, 5th Baron Willoughby de Broke	1606	1628	
Baron Monteagle (1514)	William Parker, 4th Baron Monteagle	1581	1622	
Baron Vaux of Harrowden (1523)	Edward Vaux, 4th Baron Vaux of Harrowden	1595	1661	
Baron Sandys of the Vine (1529)	William Sandys, 3rd Baron Sandys	1560	1623	
Baron Burgh (1529)	Robert Burgh, 4th Baron Burgh	1597	1602	Died, title fell into abeyance until 1916
Baron Windsor (1529)	Henry Windsor, 5th Baron Windsor	1585	1605	Died
Baron Windsor (1529)	Thomas Windsor, 6th Baron Windsor	1605	1642	
Baron Wentworth (1529)	Thomas Wentworth, 4th Baron Wentworth	1593	1667	
Baron Mordaunt (1532)	Lewis Mordaunt, 3rd Baron Mordaunt	1571	1601	Died
Baron Mordaunt (1532)	Henry Mordaunt, 4th Baron Mordaunt	1601	1609	Died
Baron Mordaunt (1532)	John Mordaunt, 5th Baron Mordaunt	1609	1644	
Baron Cromwell (1540)	Edward Cromwell, 3rd Baron Cromwell	1593	1607	Died
Baron Cromwell (1540)	Thomas Cromwell, 4th Baron Cromwell	1607	1653	
Baron Eure (1544)	Ralph Eure, 3rd Baron Eure	1594	1617	
Baron Wharton (1545)	Philip Wharton, 3rd Baron Wharton	1572	1625	
Baron Sheffield (1547)	Edmund Sheffield, 3rd Baron Sheffield	1568	1646	
Baron Rich (1547)	Robert Rich, 3rd Baron Rich	1581	1618	
Baron Willoughby of Parham (1547)	Charles Willoughby, 2nd Baron Willoughby of Parham	1570	1612	
Baron Lumley (1547)	John Lumley, 1st Baron Lumley	1547	1609	Died, title extinct
Baron Darcy of Aston (1548)	John Darcy, 2nd Baron Darcy of Aston	1558	1602	Died
Baron Darcy of Aston (1548)	John Darcy, 3rd Baron Darcy of Aston	1602	1635	
Baron Darcy of Chiche (1551)	Thomas Darcy, 3rd Baron Darcy of Chiche	1581	1640	
Baron Paget (1552)	William Paget, 4th Baron Paget	1604	1629	Restored
Baron North (1554)	Roger North, 2nd Baron North	1564	1600	Died
Baron North (1554)	Dudley North, 3rd Baron North	1600	1666	
Baron Chandos (1554)	William Brydges, 4th Baron Chandos	1594	1602	Died
Baron Chandos (1554)	Grey Brydges, 5th Baron Chandos	1602	1621	
Baron Hunsdon (1559)	George Carey, 2nd Baron Hunsdon	1596	1603	Died
Baron Hunsdon (1559)	John Carey, 3rd Baron Hunsdon	1603	1617	
Baron St John of Bletso (1559)	Oliver St John, 3rd Baron St John of Bletso	1596	1618	
Baron Buckhurst (1567)	Thomas Sackville, 1st Baron Buckhurst	1567	1608	Created Earl of Dorset in 1604, see above
Baron De La Warr (1570)	Thomas West, 2nd Baron De La Warr	1595	1602	Died
Baron De La Warr (1570)	Thomas West, 3rd Baron De La Warr	1602	1618	
Baron Burghley (1571)	Thomas Cecil, 2nd Baron Burghley	1598	1623	Created Earl of Exeter in 1604, see above
Baron Compton (1572)	William Compton, 2nd Baron Compton	1589	1630	
Baron Norreys (1572)	Henry Norris, 1st Baron Norreys	1572	1601	Died
Baron Norreys (1572)	Francis Norris, 2nd Baron Norreys	1601	1622	
Baron Howard de Walden (1597)	Thomas Howard, 1st Earl of Suffolk	1597	1626	Created Earl of Suffolk in 1603; Barony held by his heirs until 1689 when it fell into abeyance
Baron Knollys (1603)	William Knollys, 1st Baron Knollys	1603	1632	New creation
Baron (A)bergavenny (1604)	Edward Nevill, 1st Baron Bergavenny	1604	1622	New creation
Baron Danvers (1603)	Henry Danvers, 1st Baron Danvers	1603	1644	New creation
Baron Ellesmere (1603)	Thomas Egerton, 1st Baron Ellesmere	1603	1617	New creation
Baron Gerard (1603)	Thomas Gerard, 1st Baron Gerard	1603	1617	New creation
Baron Grey of Groby (1603)	Henry Grey, 1st Baron Grey of Groby	1603	1614	New creation
Baron Harington of Exton (1603)	John Harington, 1st Baron Harington of Exton	1603	1613	New creation
Baron Petre (1603)	John Petre, 1st Baron Petre	1603	1613	New creation
Baron Russell of Thornhaugh (1603)	William Russell, 1st Baron Russell of Thornhaugh	1603	1613	New creation
Baron Spencer (1603)	Robert Spencer, 1st Baron Spencer of Wormleighton	1603	1627	New creation
Baron Wotton (1603)	Edward Wotton, 1st Baron Wotton	1603	1628	New creation
Baron Denny (1604)	Edward Denny, 1st Baron Denny	1604	1630	New creation
Baron Arundell of Wardour (1605)	Thomas Arundell, 1st Baron Arundell of Wardour	1605	1639	New creation
Baron Carew (1605)	George Carew, 1st Baron Carew	1605	1629	New creation
Baron Cavendish of Hardwick (1605)	William Cavendish, 1st Baron Cavendish of Hardwick	1605	1626	New creation
Baron Stanhope of Harrington (1605)	John Stanhope, 1st Baron Stanhope	1605	1621	New creation
Baron Hay (1606)	James Hay, 1st Baron Hay	1606	1636	New creation
Baron Knyvett (1607)	Thomas Knyvet, 1st Baron Knyvet	1607	1622	New creation
Baron Clifton (1608)	Gervase Clifton, 1st Baron Clifton	1608	1618	New creation

== Peerage of Scotland ==
Title	Holder	Date gained	Date lost	Notes
Duke of Rothesay (1398)	Henry Frederick Stuart, Duke of Rothesay	1594	1612	
Duke of Lennox (1581)	Ludovic Stewart, 2nd Duke of Lennox	1583	1624	
Duke of Albany (1600)	Charles Stuart, 1st Duke of Albany	1600	1625	New creation
Duke of Kintyre and Lorne (1602)	Robert Stuart, Duke of Kintyre and Lorne	1602	1602	New creation; died, title extinct
Marquess of Huntly (1599)	George Gordon, 1st Marquess of Huntly	1599	1636	
Marquess of Hamilton (1599)	John Hamilton, 1st Marquess of Hamilton	1599	1604	Died
Marquess of Hamilton (1599)	James Hamilton, 2nd Marquess of Hamilton	1604	1625	
Earl of Angus (1389)	William Douglas, 10th Earl of Angus	1591	1611	
Earl of Argyll (1457)	Archibald Campbell, 7th Earl of Argyll	1584	1638	
Earl of Crawford (1398)	David Lindsay, 11th Earl of Crawford	1574	1607	Died
Earl of Crawford (1398)	David Lindsay, 12th Earl of Crawford	1607	1620	
Earl of Erroll (1452)	Francis Hay, 9th Earl of Erroll	1585	1631	
Earl Marischal (1458)	George Keith, 5th Earl Marischal	1581	1623	
Earl of Sutherland (1235)	John Gordon, 13th Earl of Sutherland	1594	1615	
Earl of Mar (1114)	John Erskine, 19th/2nd Earl of Mar	1572	1634	
Earl of Rothes (1458)	Andrew Leslie, 5th Earl of Rothes	1558	1611	
Earl of Morton (1458)	William Douglas, 6th Earl of Morton	1588	1606	Died
Earl of Morton (1458)	William Douglas, 7th Earl of Morton	1606	1648	
Earl of Menteith (1427)	William Graham, 7th Earl of Menteith	1598	1661	
Earl of Glencairn (1488)	James Cunningham, 7th Earl of Glencairn	1578	1630	
Earl of Eglinton (1507)	Hugh Montgomerie, 5th Earl of Eglinton	1586	1612	
Earl of Arran (1503)	James Hamilton, 3rd Earl of Arran	1575	1609	Died, title succeeded by the Marquess of Hamilton, see above
Earl of Montrose (1503)	John Graham, 3rd Earl of Montrose	1571	1608	Died
Earl of Montrose (1503)	John Graham, 4th Earl of Montrose	1608	1626	
Earl of Cassilis (1509)	John Kennedy, 5th Earl of Cassilis	1576	1615	
Earl of Caithness (1455)	George Sinclair, 5th Earl of Caithness	1582	1643	
Earl of Buchan (1469)	James Douglas, 5th Earl of Buchan	1580	1601	Died
Earl of Buchan (1469)	Mary Douglas, 6th Countess of Buchan	1601	1628	
Earl of Moray (1562)	James Stuart, 3rd Earl of Moray	1591	1638	
Earl of Orkney (1581)	Patrick Stewart, 2nd Earl of Orkney	1593	1614	
Earl of Gowrie (1581)	John Ruthven, 3rd Earl of Gowrie	1588	1600	Title forfeited
Earl of Atholl (1596)	John Stewart, 1st Earl of Atholl	1596	1603	Died
Earl of Atholl (1596)	James Stewart, 2nd Earl of Atholl	1603	1625	
Earl of Linlithgow (1600)	Alexander Livingstone, 1st Earl of Linlithgow	1600	1621	New creation
Earl of Winton (1600)	Robert Seton, 1st Earl of Winton	1600	1603	New creation; died
Earl of Winton (1600)	Robert Seton, 2nd Earl of Winton	1603	1607	Resigned
Earl of Winton (1600)	George Seton, 3rd Earl of Winton	1607	1650	
Earl of Home (1605)	Alexander Home, 1st Earl of Home	1605	1619	New creation
Earl of Perth (1605)	James Drummond, 1st Earl of Perth	1605	1611	New creation
Earl of Dunfermline (1605)	Alexander Seton, 1st Earl of Dunfermline	1605	1622	New creation
Earl of Dunbar (1605)	George Home, 1st Earl of Dunbar	1605	1611	New creation
Earl of Wigtown (1606)	John Fleming, 1st Earl of Wigtown	1606	1619	New creation
Earl of Abercorn (1606)	James Hamilton, 1st Earl of Abercorn	1606	1618	New creation (also created Baron Abercorn in 1603)
Earl of Kinghorne (1606)	Patrick Lyon, 1st Earl of Kinghorne	1606	1615	New creation
Earl of Lothian (1606)	Mark Kerr, 1st Earl of Lothian	1606	1609	New creation; died
Earl of Lothian (1606)	Robert Kerr, 2nd Earl of Lothian	1609	1624	
Earl of Tullibardine (1606)	John Murray, 1st Earl of Tullibardine	1606	1609	New creation; died
Earl of Tullibardine (1606)	William Murray, 2nd Earl of Tullibardine	1609	1626	
Viscount of Fentoun (1606)	Thomas Erskine, 1st Viscount of Fentoun	1606	1639	New creation, also created Lord Erskine of Dirleton in 1603
Viscount of Haddington (1606)	John Ramsay, 1st Viscount of Haddington	1606	1626	New creation
Lord Somerville (1430)	Gilbert Somerville, 8th Lord Somerville	1597	1618	
Lord Forbes (1442)	John Forbes, 8th Lord Forbes	1593	1606	
Lord Forbes (1442)	Arthur Forbes, 9th Lord Forbes	1606	1641	
Lord Maxwell (1445)	John Maxwell, 9th Lord Maxwell	1593	1613	
Lord Glamis (1445)	Patrick Lyon, 9th Lord Glamis	1578	1615	Created Earl of Kinghorne, see above
Lord Lindsay of the Byres (1445)	James Lindsay, 7th Lord Lindsay	1589	1601	Died
Lord Lindsay of the Byres (1445)	John Lindsay, 8th Lord Lindsay	1601	1609	
Lord Lindsay of the Byres (1445)	Robert Lindsay, 9th Lord Lindsay	1609	1619	
Lord Saltoun (1445)	John Abernethy, 8th Lord Saltoun	1590	1612	
Lord Gray (1445)	Patrick Gray, 5th Lord Gray	1584	1608	Died
Lord Gray (1445)	Patrick Gray, 6th Lord Gray	1608	1611	
Lord Sinclair (1449)	Henry Sinclair, 5th Lord Sinclair	1570	1601	Died
Lord Sinclair (1449)	Henry Sinclair, 6th Lord Sinclair	1601	1602	Died
Lord Sinclair (1449)	James Sinclair, 7th Lord Sinclair	1602	1607	Died
Lord Sinclair (1449)	Patrick Sinclair, 8th Lord Sinclair	1607	1615	
Lord Fleming (1451)	John Fleming, 6th Lord Fleming	1572	1619	Created Earl of Wigtown, see above
Lord Seton (1451)	Robert Seton, 8th Lord Seton	1586	1603	Created Earl of Winton, see above
Lord Borthwick (1452)	John Borthwick, 8th Lord Borthwick	1599	1623	
Lord Boyd (1454)	Thomas Boyd, 6th Lord Boyd	1590	1611	
Lord Oliphant (1455)	Laurence Oliphant, 5th Lord Oliphant	1593	1631	
Lord Livingston (1458)	Alexander Livingston, 7th Lord Livingston	1592	1623	Created Earl of Linlithgow, see above
Lord Cathcart (1460)	Alan Cathcart, 4th Lord Cathcart	1547	1618	
Lord Lovat (1464)	Simon Fraser, 6th Lord Lovat	1577	1633	
Lord Carlyle of Torthorwald (1473)	Elizabeth Douglas, 5th Lady Carlyle	1575	1605	Died
Lord Carlyle of Torthorwald (1473)	James Douglas, 6th Lord Carlyle	1605	1638	
Lord Home (1473)	Alexander Home, 6th Lord Home	1575	1619	Created Earl of Home, see above
Lord Crichton of Sanquhar (1488)	Robert Crichton, 8th Lord Crichton of Sanquhar	1569	1612	
Lord Drummond of Cargill (1488)	Patrick Drummond, 3rd Lord Drummond	1571	1600	Died
Lord Drummond of Cargill (1488)	James Drummond, 4th Lord Drummond	1600	1611	Created Earl of Perth, see above
Lord Hay of Yester (1488)	James Hay, 7th Lord Hay of Yester	1591	1609	Died
Lord Hay of Yester (1488)	John Hay, 8th Lord Hay of Yester	1609	1653	
Lord Sempill (1489)	Robert Sempill, 4th Lord Sempill	1576	1611	
Lord Herries of Terregles (1490)	William Maxwell, 5th Lord Herries of Terregles	1594	1604	Died
Lord Herries of Terregles (1490)	John Maxwell, 6th Lord Herries of Terregles	1604	1631	
Lord Ogilvy of Airlie (1491)	James Ogilvy, 5th Lord Ogilvy of Airlie	1549	1606	Died
Lord Ogilvy of Airlie (1491)	James Ogilvy, 6th Lord Ogilvy of Airlie	1606	1617	
Lord Ross (1499)	James Ross, 6th Lord Ross	1595	1633	
Lord Elphinstone (1509)	Robert Elphinstone, 3rd Lord Elphinstone	1547	1602	Died
Lord Elphinstone (1509)	Alexander, 4th Lord Elphinstone	1602	1638	
Lord Ochiltree (1543)	Andrew Stuart, 3rd Lord Ochiltree	1591	1615	
Lord Torphichen (1564)	James Sandilands, 2nd Lord Torphichen	1579	1617	
Lord Paisley (1587)	Claud Hamilton, 1st Lord Paisley	1587	1621	
Lord Maitland (1590)	John Maitland, 2nd Lord Maitland of Thirlestane	1595	1645	
Lord Spynie (1590)	Alexander Lindsay, 1st Lord Spynie	1590	1607	Died
Lord Spynie (1590)	Alexander Lindsay, 2nd Lord Spynie	1607	1646	
Lord Newbottle (1591)	Mark Kerr, 1st Lord Newbottle	1591	1609	Created Earl of Lothian, see above
Lord Fyvie (1598)	Alexander Seton, 1st Lord Fyvie	1598	1622	Created Earl of Dunfermline, see above
Lord Roxburghe (1600)	Robert Ker, 1st Lord Roxburghe	1600	1650	New creation
Lord Lindores (1600)	Patrick Leslie, 1st Lord Lindores	1600	1608	New creation; died
Lord Lindores (1600)	Patrick Leslie, 2nd Lord Lindores	1608	1649	
Lord Campbell of Loudoun (1601)	Hugh Campbell, 1st Lord Campbell of Loudoun	1601	1619	New creation
Lord Kinloss (1602)	Edward Bruce, 1st Lord Kinloss	1602	1611	New creation; created Lord Bruce of Kinloss in 1608
Lord Colville of Culross (1604)	James Colville, 1st Lord Colville of Culross	1604	1629	New creation
Lord Scone (1605)	David Murray, 1st Lord Scone	1605	1631	New creation
Lord Balmerinoch (1606)	James Elphinstone, 1st Lord Balmerinoch	1606	1612	New creation
Lord Blantyre (1606)	Walter Stewart, 1st Lord Blantyre	1606	1617	New creation
Lord Scott of Buccleuch (1606)	Walter Scott, 1st Lord Scott of Buccleuch	1606	1611	New creation
Lord Coupar (1607)	James Elphinstone, 1st Lord Coupar	1607	1669	New creation
Lord Holyroodhouse (1607)	John Bothwell, 1st Lord Holyroodhouse	1607	1609	New creation; died
Lord Holyroodhouse (1607)	John Bothwell, 2nd Lord Holyroodhouse	1609	1638	
Lord Garlies (1607)	Alexander Stewart, 1st Lord Garlies	1607	1649	New creation
Lord Balfour of Burleigh (1607)	Michael Balfour, 1st Lord Balfour of Burleigh	1607	1619	New creation
Lord Cranstoun (1609)	William Cranstoun, 1st Lord Cranstoun	1609	1627	New creation
Lord Mackenzie of Kintail (1609)	Kenneth Mackenzie, 1st Lord Mackenzie of Kintail	1609	1611	New creation
Lord Pittenweem (1609)	Frederick Stewart, 1st Lord Pittenweem	1609	1625	New creation
Lord Maderty (1609)	James Drummond, 1st Lord Madderty	1609	1623	New creation
Lord Dingwall (1609)	Richard Preston, 1st Lord Dingwall	1609	1628	New creation

== Peerage of Ireland ==
Title	Holder	Date gained	Date lost	Notes
Earl of Kildare (1316)	Gerald FitzGerald, 14th Earl of Kildare	1599	1612	
Earl of Ormond (1328)	Thomas Butler, 10th Earl of Ormond	1546	1614	
Earl of Waterford (1446)	Gilbert Talbot, 7th Earl of Waterford	1590	1616	
Earl of Tyrone (1542)	Hugh O'Neill, 3rd Earl of Tyrone	1562	1608	Attainted
Earl of Clanricarde (1543)	Ulick Burke, 3rd Earl of Clanricarde	1582	1601	Died
Earl of Clanricarde (1543)	Richard Burke, 4th Earl of Clanricarde	1601	1635	
Earl of Thomond (1543)	Donogh O'Brien, 4th Earl of Thomond	1581	1624	
Earl of Desmond (1600)	James FitzGerald, 1st Earl of Desmond	1600	1601	New creation; died, title extinct
Earl of Tyrconnell (1603)	Rory O'Donnell, 1st earl of Tyrconnell	1603	1608	New creation; fled the country, and died
Viscount Gormanston (1478)	Jenico Preston, 5th Viscount Gormanston	1599	1630	
Viscount Buttevant (1541)	David de Barry, 5th Viscount Buttevant	1581	1617	
Viscount Mountgarret (1550)	Edmund Butler, 2nd Viscount Mountgarret	1571	1602	Died
Viscount Mountgarret (1550)	Richard Butler, 3rd Viscount Mountgarret	1602	1651	
Viscount Butler of Tulleophelim (1603)	Theobald Butler, 1st Viscount Butler of Tulleophelim	1603	1613	New creation
Baron Athenry (1172)	Edmond I de Bermingham	1580	1612	
Baron Kingsale (1223)	John de Courcy, 18th Baron Kingsale	1599	1628	
Baron Kerry (1223)	Patrick Fitzmaurice, 17th Baron Kerry	1590	1600	Died
Baron Kerry (1223)	Thomas Fitzmaurice, 18th Baron Kerry	1600	1630	
Baron Slane (1370)	William Fleming, 11th Baron Slane	1597	1612	
Baron Howth (1425)	Nicholas St Lawrence, 9th Baron Howth	1589	1606	Died
Baron Howth (1425)	Christopher St Lawrence, 10th Baron Howth	1606	1619	
Baron Killeen (1449)	Christopher Plunkett, 9th Baron Killeen	1595	1613	
Baron Trimlestown (1461)	Robert Barnewall, 7th Baron Trimlestown	1598	1639	
Baron Dunsany (1462)	Patrick Plunkett, 7th Baron of Dunsany	1564	1601	Died
Baron Dunsany (1462)	Christopher Plunkett, 8th Baron of Dunsany	1601	1603	Died
Baron Dunsany (1462)	Patrick Plunkett, 9th Baron of Dunsany	1603	1668	
Baron Delvin (1486)	Christopher Nugent, 6th Baron Delvin	1559	1602	Died
Baron Delvin (1486)	Richard Nugent, 7th Baron Delvin	1602	1642	
Baron Power (1535)	Richard Power, 4th Baron Power	1592	1607	Died
Baron Power (1535)	John Power, 5th Baron Power	1607	1661	
Baron Dunboyne (1541)	James Butler, 2nd/12th Baron Dunboyne	1566	1624	
Baron Louth (1541)	Oliver Plunkett, 4th Baron Louth	1575	1607	Died
Baron Louth (1541)	Matthew Plunkett, 5th Baron Louth	1607	1629	
Baron Upper Ossory (1541)	Florence Fitzpatrick, 3rd Baron Upper Ossory	1581	1613	
Baron Inchiquin (1543)	Dermod O'Brien, 5th Baron Inchiquin	1597	1624	
Baron Bourke of Castleconnell (1580)	Edmund Bourke, 5th Baron Bourke of Connell	1599	1635	
Baron Cahir (1583)	Thomas Butler, 2nd Baron Cahir	1596	1627	

Preceded by List of peers 1590–1599	Lists of peers by decade 1600–1609	Succeeded by List of peers 1610–1619
