= List of peers 1610–1619 =

This page lists all peers who held extant titles between 1610 and 1619.

== Peerage of England ==
Title	Holder	Date gained	Date lost	Notes
Duke of Cornwall (1337)	Henry Frederick Stuart	1603	1612	Died, and his peerage dignities lapsed to the Crown
Duke of Cornwall (1337)	Prince Charles	1612	1625	1st Duke of York
Duke of York (1605)	Charles Stuart	1605	1625	Duke of Cornwall since 1612, see above
Marquess of Winchester (1551)	William Paulet, 4th Marquess of Winchester	1598	1628	
Marquess of Buckingham (16181)	George Villiers, 1st Marquess of Buckingham	1618	1628	New creation; Earl of Buckingham in 1617; Viscount Villiers in 1616
Earl of Arundel (1138)	Thomas Howard, 21st Earl of Arundel	1604	1646	
Earl of Oxford (1142)	Henry de Vere, 18th Earl of Oxford	1604	1625	
Earl of Shrewsbury (1442)	Gilbert Talbot, 7th Earl of Shrewsbury	1590	1616	Died
Earl of Shrewsbury (1442)	Edward Talbot, 8th Earl of Shrewsbury	1616	1617	Died
Earl of Shrewsbury (1442)	George Talbot, 9th Earl of Shrewsbury	1617	1630	
Earl of Kent (1465)	Henry Grey, 6th Earl of Kent	1573	1615	Died
Earl of Kent (1465)	Charles Grey, 7th Earl of Kent	1615	1623	
Earl of Derby (1485)	William Stanley, 6th Earl of Derby	1594	1642	
Earl of Worcester (1514)	Edward Somerset, 4th Earl of Worcester	1589	1628	
Earl of Cumberland (1525)	Francis Clifford, 4th Earl of Cumberland	1605	1641	
Earl of Rutland (1525)	Roger Manners, 5th Earl of Rutland	1588	1612	Died
Earl of Rutland (1525)	Francis Manners, 6th Earl of Rutland	1612	1632	
Earl of Huntington (1529)	Henry Hastings, 5th Earl of Huntingdon	1604	1643	
Earl of Sussex (1529)	Robert Radclyffe, 5th Earl of Sussex	1593	1629	
Earl of Bath (1536)	William Bourchier, 3rd Earl of Bath	1561	1623	
Earl of Southampton (1547)	Henry Wriothesley, 3rd Earl of Southampton	1581	1624	
Earl of Bedford (1550)	Edward Russell, 3rd Earl of Bedford	1585	1627	
Earl of Pembroke (1551)	William Herbert, 3rd Earl of Pembroke	1601	1630	
Earl of Devon (1553)	William Courtenay, de jure 3rd Earl of Devon	1557	1630	
Earl of Northumberland (1557)	Henry Percy, 9th Earl of Northumberland	1585	1632	
Earl of Hertford (1559)	Edward Seymour, 1st Earl of Hertford	1559	1621	
Earl of Essex (1572)	Robert Devereux, 3rd Earl of Essex	1604	1646	
Earl of Lincoln (1572)	Henry Clinton, 2nd Earl of Lincoln	1585	1616	Died
Earl of Lincoln (1572)	Thomas Clinton, 3rd Earl of Lincoln	1616	1619	Died
Earl of Lincoln (1572)	Theophilus Clinton, 4th Earl of Lincoln	1619	1667	
Earl of Nottingham (1596)	Charles Howard, 1st Earl of Nottingham	1596	1624	
Earl of Suffolk (1603)	Thomas Howard, 1st Earl of Suffolk	1603	1626	
Earl of Dorset (1604)	Richard Sackville, 3rd Earl of Dorset	1609	1624	
Earl of Northampton (1604)	Henry Howard, 1st Earl of Northampton	1604	1614	Died, title extinct
Earl of Exeter (1605)	Thomas Cecil, 1st Earl of Exeter	1605	1623	
Earl of Montgomery (1605)	Philip Herbert, 1st Earl of Montgomery	1605	1649	
Earl of Salisbury (1605)	Robert Cecil, 1st Earl of Salisbury	1605	1612	Died
Earl of Salisbury (1605)	William Cecil, 2nd Earl of Salisbury	1612	1668	
Earl of Richmond (1613)	Ludovic Stewart, 1st Earl of Richmond	1613	1624	New creation
Earl of Somerset (1613)	Robert Carr, 1st Earl of Somerset	1613	1645	New creation; Viscount Rochester in 1611
Earl of Bridgewater (1617)	John Egerton, 1st Earl of Bridgewater	1617	1649	New creation
Countess of Buckingham (1618)	Mary Villiers, Countess of Buckingham	1618	1632	New creation, for life only
Earl of Northampton (1618)	William Compton, 1st Earl of Northampton	1618	1630	New creation
Earl of Leicester (1618)	Robert Sidney, 1st Earl of Leicester	1618	1626	New creation
Earl of Warwick (1618)	Robert Rich, 1st Earl of Warwick	1618	1618	New creation
Earl of Warwick (1618)	Robert Rich, 2nd Earl of Warwick	1618	1658	
Earl of Devonshire (1618)	William Cavendish, 1st Earl of Devonshire	1618	1626	New creation
Earl of March (1619)	Esmé Stewart, 1st Earl of March	1619	1624	New creation
Earl of Cambridge (1619)	James Hamilton, 1st Earl of Cambridge	1619	1625	New creation, also Marquess of Hamilton in the Peerage of Scotland
Viscount Montagu (1554)	Anthony-Maria Browne, 2nd Viscount Montagu	1592	1629	
Viscount Howard of Bindon (1559)	Thomas Howard, 3rd Viscount Howard of Bindon	1590	1611	Died, title extinct
Viscount Lisle (1605)	Robert Sidney, 1st Viscount Lisle	1605	1626	Created Earl of Leicester, see above
Viscount Brackley (1616)	Thomas Egerton, 1st Viscount Brackley	1616	1617	New creation, died
Viscount Brackley (1616)	John Egerton, 2nd Viscount Brackley	1617	1649	Created Earl of Bridgewater, see above
Viscount Wallingford (1616)	William Knollys, 1st Viscount Wallingford	1616	1632	New creation
Viscount Doncaster (1618)	James Hay, 1st Viscount Doncaster	1618	1636	New creation
Viscount Purbeck (1618)	John Villiers, 1st Viscount Purbeck	1619	1657	New creation
Baron de Ros (1264)	William Cecil, 17th Baron de Ros	1591	1618	Title succeeded by the Earl of Rutland, see above
Baron le Despencer (1264)	Mary Fane, 3rd Baroness le Despenser	1604	1626	
Baron de Clifford (1299)	Anne Clifford, 14th Baroness de Clifford	1605	1676	
Baron Morley (1299)	Edward Parker, 12th Baron Morley	1577	1618	Died
Baron Morley (1299)	William Parker, 13th Baron Morley	1618	1622	
Baron Zouche of Haryngworth (1308)	Edward la Zouche, 11th Baron Zouche	1569	1625	
Baron Audley of Heleigh (1313)	George Tuchet, 11th Baron Audley	1563	1617	Created Earl of Castlehaven, in the Peerage of Ireland; barony held by his heirs until 1777, when Earldom became extinct, and Barony passed to a nephew and heir
Baron Willoughby de Eresby (1313)	Robert Bertie, 14th Baron Willoughby de Eresby	1601	1640	
Baron Dacre (1321)	Margaret Fiennes, 11th Baroness Dacre	1594	1612	Died
Baron Dacre (1321)	Henry Lennard, 12th Baron Dacre	1612	1616	Died
Baron Dacre (1321)	Richard Lennard, 13th Baron Dacre	1616	1630	
Baron Scrope of Bolton (1371)	Emanuel Scrope, 11th Baron Scrope of Bolton	1609	1630	
Baron Berkeley (1421)	Henry Berkeley, 7th Baron Berkeley	1534	1613	Died
Baron Berkeley (1421)	George Berkeley, 8th Baron Berkeley	1613	1658	
Baron Dudley (1440)	Edward Sutton, 5th Baron Dudley	1586	1643	
Baron Saye and Sele (1447)	Richard Fiennes, 7th Baron Saye and Sele	1573	1613	Died
Baron Saye and Sele (1447)	William Fiennes, 8th Baron Saye and Sele	1613	1662	
Baron Stourton (1448)	Edward Stourton, 10th Baron Stourton	1588	1633	
Baron Willoughby de Broke (1491)	Fulke Greville, 5th Baron Willoughby de Broke	1606	1628	
Baron Monteagle (1514)	William Parker, 4th Baron Monteagle	1581	1622	
Baron Vaux of Harrowden (1523)	Edward Vaux, 4th Baron Vaux of Harrowden	1595	1661	
Baron Sandys of the Vine (1529)	William Sandys, 3rd Baron Sandys	1560	1623	
Baron Windsor (1529)	Thomas Windsor, 6th Baron Windsor	1605	1642	
Baron Wentworth (1529)	Thomas Wentworth, 4th Baron Wentworth	1593	1667	
Baron Mordaunt (1532)	John Mordaunt, 5th Baron Mordaunt	1601	1644	
Baron Cromwell (1540)	Thomas Cromwell, 4th Baron Cromwell	1607	1653	
Baron Eure (1544)	Ralph Eure, 3rd Baron Eure	1594	1617	Died
Baron Eure (1544)	William Eure, 4th Baron Eure	1617	1646	
Baron Wharton (1545)	Philip Wharton, 3rd Baron Wharton	1572	1625	
Baron Sheffield (1547)	Edmund Sheffield, 3rd Baron Sheffield	1568	1646	
Baron Rich (1547)	Robert Rich, 3rd Baron Rich	1581	1618	Created Earl of Warwick in 1618, see above
Baron Willoughby of Parham (1547)	Charles Willoughby, 2nd Baron Willoughby of Parham	1570	1612	Died
Baron Willoughby of Parham (1547)	William Willoughby, 3rd Baron Willoughby of Parham	1612	1617	Died
Baron Willoughby of Parham (1547)	Henry Willoughby, 4th Baron Willoughby of Parham	1617	1618	Died
Baron Willoughby of Parham (1547)	Francis Willoughby, 5th Baron Willoughby of Parham	1618	1666	
Baron Darcy of Aston (1548)	John Darcy, 3rd Baron Darcy of Aston	1602	1635	
Baron Darcy of Chiche (1551)	Thomas Darcy, 3rd Baron Darcy of Chiche	1581	1640	
Baron Paget (1552)	William Paget, 4th Baron Paget	1604	1629	
Baron North (1554)	Dudley North, 3rd Baron North	1600	1666	
Baron Chandos (1554)	Grey Brydges, 5th Baron Chandos	1602	1621	
Baron Hunsdon (1559)	John Carey, 3rd Baron Hunsdon	1603	1617	Died
Baron Hunsdon (1559)	Henry Carey, 4th Baron Hunsdon	1617	1666	
Baron St John of Bletso (1559)	Oliver St John, 3rd Baron St John of Bletso	1596	1618	Died
Baron St John of Bletso (1559)	Oliver St John, 4th Baron St John of Bletso	1618	1646	
Baron De La Warr (1570)	Thomas West, 3rd Baron De La Warr	1602	1618	Died
Baron De La Warr (1570)	Henry West, 4th Baron De La Warr	1618	1628	
Baron Compton (1572)	William Compton, 2nd Baron Compton	1589	1630	Created Earl of Northampton, see above
Baron Norreys (1572)	Francis Norris, 2nd Baron Norreys	1601	1622	
Baron Knollys (1603)	William Knollys, 1st Baron Knollys	1603	1632	Created Viscount Wallingford, see above
Baron (A)bergavenny (1604)	Edward Nevill, 1st Baron Bergavenny	1604	1622	
Baron Danvers (1603)	Henry Danvers, 1st Baron Danvers	1603	1644	
Baron Ellesmere (1603)	Thomas Egerton, 1st Baron Ellesmere	1603	1617	Created Viscount Brackley, see above
Baron Gerard (1603)	Thomas Gerard, 1st Baron Gerard	1603	1617	Died
Baron Gerard (1603)	Gilbert Gerard, 2nd Baron Gerard	1617	1622	
Baron Grey of Groby (1603)	Henry Grey, 1st Baron Grey of Groby	1603	1614	Died
Baron Grey of Groby (1603)	Henry Grey, 2nd Baron Grey of Groby	1614	1673	
Baron Harington of Exton (1603)	John Harington, 1st Baron Harington of Exton	1603	1613	Died
Baron Harington of Exton (1603)	John Harington, 2nd Baron Harington of Exton	1613	1614	Died, title extinct
Baron Petre (1603)	John Petre, 1st Baron Petre	1603	1613	Died
Baron Petre (1603)	William Petre, 2nd Baron Petre	1613	1637	
Baron Russell of Thornhaugh (1603)	William Russell, 1st Baron Russell of Thornhaugh	1603	1613	Died
Baron Russell of Thornhaugh (1603)	Francis Russell, 2nd Baron Russell of Thornhaugh	1613	1641	
Baron Spencer (1603)	Robert Spencer, 1st Baron Spencer of Wormleighton	1603	1627	
Baron Wotton (1603)	Edward Wotton, 1st Baron Wotton	1603	1628	
Baron Denny (1604)	Edward Denny, 1st Baron Denny	1604	1630	
Baron Arundell of Wardour (1605)	Thomas Arundell, 1st Baron Arundell of Wardour	1605	1639	
Baron Carew (1605)	George Carew, 1st Baron Carew	1605	1629	
Baron Cavendish of Hardwick (1605)	William Cavendish, 1st Baron Cavendish of Hardwick	1605	1626	Created Earl of Devonshire, see above
Baron Stanhope of Harrington (1605)	John Stanhope, 1st Baron Stanhope	1605	1621	
Baron Hay (1606)	James Hay, 1st Baron Hay	1606	1636	Created Viscount Doncaster, see above
Baron Knyvett (1607)	Thomas Knyvet, 1st Baron Knyvet	1607	1622	
Baron Clifton (1608)	Gervase Clifton, 1st Baron Clifton	1608	1618	Died
Baron Clifton (1608)	Katherine Clifton, 2nd Baroness Clifton	1618	1637	
Baron Dormer (1615)	Robert Dormer, 1st Baron Dormer	1615	1616	New creation, died
Baron Dormer (1615)	Robert Dormer, 2nd Baron Dormer	1616	1643	
Baron Teynham (1616)	John Roper, 1st Baron Teynham	1616	1618	New creation, died
Baron Teynham (1616)	Christopher Roper, 2nd Baron Teynham	1618	1622	
Baron Houghton (1616)	John Holles, 1st Baron Houghton	1616	1637	New creation
Baron Stanhope of Shelford (1616)	Philip Stanhope, 1st Baron Stanhope of Shelford	1616	1656	New creation
Baron Noel (1617)	Edward Noel, 1st Baron Noel	1617	1643	New creation
Baron Verulam (1618)	Francis Bacon, 1st Baron Verulam	1618	1626	New creation
Baron Digby (1618)	John Digby, 1st Baron Digby	1618	1653	New creation

== Peerage of Scotland ==
Title	Holder	Date gained	Date lost	Notes
Duke of Rothesay (1398)	Henry Frederick Stuart, Duke of Rothesay	1594	1612	Died
Duke of Rothesay (1398)	Charles Stuart, Duke of Rothesay	1612	1625	
Duke of Lennox (1581)	Ludovic Stewart, 2nd Duke of Lennox	1583	1624	
Duke of Albany (1600)	Charles Stuart, 1st Duke of Albany	1600	1625	Succeeded as Duke of Rothesay, see above
Marquess of Huntly (1599)	George Gordon, 1st Marquess of Huntly	1599	1636	
Marquess of Hamilton (1599)	James Hamilton, 2nd Marquess of Hamilton	1604	1625	
Earl of Angus (1389)	William Douglas, 10th Earl of Angus	1591	1611	Died
Earl of Angus (1389)	William Douglas, 11th Earl of Angus	1611	1660	
Earl of Argyll (1457)	Archibald Campbell, 7th Earl of Argyll	1584	1638	
Earl of Crawford (1398)	David Lindsay, 12th Earl of Crawford	1607	1620	
Earl of Erroll (1452)	Francis Hay, 9th Earl of Erroll	1585	1631	
Earl Marischal (1458)	George Keith, 5th Earl Marischal	1581	1623	
Earl of Sutherland (1235)	John Gordon, 13th Earl of Sutherland	1594	1615	Died
Earl of Sutherland (1235)	John Gordon, 14th Earl of Sutherland	1615	1679	
Earl of Mar (1114)	John Erskine, 19th//2nd Earl of Mar	1572	1634	
Earl of Rothes (1458)	Andrew Leslie, 5th Earl of Rothes	1558	1611	Died
Earl of Rothes (1458)	John Leslie, 6th Earl of Rothes	1611	1641	
Earl of Morton (1458)	William Douglas, 7th Earl of Morton	1606	1648	
Earl of Menteith (1427)	William Graham, 7th Earl of Menteith	1598	1661	
Earl of Glencairn (1488)	James Cunningham, 7th Earl of Glencairn	1578	1630	
Earl of Eglinton (1507)	Hugh Montgomerie, 5th Earl of Eglinton	1586	1612	Died
Earl of Eglinton (1507)	Alexander Montgomerie, 6th Earl of Eglinton	1612	1661	
Earl of Montrose (1503)	John Graham, 4th Earl of Montrose	1608	1626	
Earl of Cassilis (1509)	John Kennedy, 5th Earl of Cassilis	1576	1615	Died
Earl of Cassilis (1509)	John Kennedy, 6th Earl of Cassilis	1615	1668	
Earl of Caithness (1455)	George Sinclair, 5th Earl of Caithness	1582	1643	
Earl of Buchan (1469)	Mary Douglas, 6th Countess of Buchan	1601	1628	
Earl of Moray (1562)	James Stuart, 3rd Earl of Moray	1591	1638	
Earl of Orkney (1581)	Patrick Stewart, 2nd Earl of Orkney	1593	1614	Title forfeited
Earl of Atholl (1596)	James Stewart, 2nd Earl of Atholl	1603	1625	
Earl of Linlithgow (1600)	Alexander Livingstone, 1st Earl of Linlithgow	1600	1621	
Earl of Winton (1600)	George Seton, 3rd Earl of Winton	1607	1650	
Earl of Home (1605)	Alexander Home, 1st Earl of Home	1605	1619	Died
Earl of Home (1605)	James Home, 2nd Earl of Home	1619	1633	
Earl of Perth (1605)	James Drummond, 1st Earl of Perth	1605	1611	Died
Earl of Perth (1605)	John Drummond, 2nd Earl of Perth	1611	1662	
Earl of Dunfermline (1605)	Alexander Seton, 1st Earl of Dunfermline	1605	1622	
Earl of Dunbar (1605)	George Home, 1st Earl of Dunbar	1605	1611	Died, title dormant
Earl of Wigtown (1606)	John Fleming, 1st Earl of Wigtown	1606	1619	Died
Earl of Wigtown (1606)	John Fleming, 2nd Earl of Wigtown	1619	1650	
Earl of Abercorn (1606)	James Hamilton, 1st Earl of Abercorn	1606	1618	Died
Earl of Abercorn (1606)	James Hamilton, 2nd Earl of Abercorn	1618	1670	
Earl of Kinghorne (1606)	Patrick Lyon, 1st Earl of Kinghorne	1606	1615	Died
Earl of Kinghorne (1606)	John Lyon, 2nd Earl of Kinghorne	1615	1646	
Earl of Lothian (1606)	Robert Kerr, 2nd Earl of Lothian	1609	1624	
Earl of Tullibardine (1606)	William Murray, 2nd Earl of Tullibardine	1609	1626	
Earl of Roxburghe (1616)	Robert Ker, 1st Earl of Roxburghe	1616	1650	New creation
Earl of Kellie (1619)	Thomas Erskine, 1st Earl of Kellie	1619	1639	New creation
Earl of Buccleuch (1619)	Walter Scott, 1st Earl of Buccleuch	1619	1633	New creation
Earl of Haddington (1619)	Thomas Hamilton, 1st Earl of Haddington	1619	1637	New creation, also created Lord Binning in 1613
Viscount of Fentoun (1606)	Thomas Erskine, 1st Viscount of Fentoun	1606	1639	Created Earl of Kellie, see above
Viscount of Haddington (1606)	John Ramsay, 1st Viscount of Haddington	1606	1626	
Viscount of Lauderdale (1616)	John Maitland, 1st Viscount of Lauderdale	1616	1645	New creation
Lord Somerville (1430)	Gilbert Somerville, 8th Lord Somerville	1597	1618	Died
Lord Somerville (1430)	Hugh Somerville, 9th Lord Somerville	1618	1640	
Lord Forbes (1442)	Arthur Forbes, 9th Lord Forbes	1606	1641	
Lord Maxwell (1445)	John Maxwell, 9th Lord Maxwell	1593	1613	Died
Lord Maxwell (1445)	Robert Maxwell, 10th Lord Maxwell	1613	1646	
Lord Lindsay of the Byres (1445)	Robert Lindsay, 9th Lord Lindsay	1609	1619	Died
Lord Lindsay of the Byres (1445)	John Lindsay, 10th Lord Lindsay	1619	1678	
Lord Saltoun (1445)	John Abernethy, 8th Lord Saltoun	1590	1612	Died
Lord Saltoun (1445)	Alexander Abernethy, 9th Lord Saltoun	1612	1668	
Lord Gray (1445)	Patrick Gray, 6th Lord Gray	1608	1611	Died
Lord Gray (1445)	Andrew Gray, 7th Lord Gray	1611	1663	
Lord Sinclair (1449)	Patrick Sinclair, 8th Lord Sinclair	1607	1615	Died
Lord Sinclair (1449)	John Sinclair, 9th Lord Sinclair	1615	1676	
Lord Borthwick (1452)	John Borthwick, 8th Lord Borthwick	1599	1623	
Lord Boyd (1454)	Thomas Boyd, 6th Lord Boyd	1590	1611	Died
Lord Boyd (1454)	Robert Boyd, 7th Lord Boyd	1611	1628	
Lord Oliphant (1455)	Laurence Oliphant, 5th Lord Oliphant	1593	1631	
Lord Cathcart (1460)	Alan Cathcart, 4th Lord Cathcart	1547	1618	Died
Lord Cathcart (1460)	Alan Cathcart, 5th Lord Cathcart	1618	1628	
Lord Lovat (1464)	Simon Fraser, 6th Lord Lovat	1577	1633	
Lord Carlyle of Torthorwald (1473)	James Douglas, 6th Lord Carlyle	1605	1638	
Lord Crichton of Sanquhar (1488)	Robert Crichton, 8th Lord Crichton of Sanquhar	1569	1612	Died
Lord Crichton of Sanquhar (1488)	William Crichton, 9th Lord Crichton of Sanquhar	1612	1643	
Lord Hay of Yester (1488)	John Hay, 8th Lord Hay of Yester	1609	1653	
Lord Sempill (1489)	Robert Sempill, 4th Lord Sempill	1576	1611	Died
Lord Sempill (1489)	Hugh Sempill, 5th Lord Sempill	1611	1639	
Lord Herries of Terregles (1490)	John Maxwell, 6th Lord Herries of Terregles	1604	1631	
Lord Ogilvy of Airlie (1491)	James Ogilvy, 6th Lord Ogilvy of Airlie	1606	1617	Died
Lord Ogilvy of Airlie (1491)	James Ogilvy, 7th Lord Ogilvy of Airlie	1617	1665	
Lord Ross (1499)	James Ross, 6th Lord Ross	1595	1633	
Lord Elphinstone (1509)	Alexander, 4th Lord Elphinstone	1602	1638	
Lord Ochiltree (1543)	Andrew Stuart, 3rd Lord Ochiltree	1591	1615	Resigned the Lordship
Lord Ochiltree (1543)	James Stewart, 4th Lord Ochiltree	1615	1658	
Lord Torphichen (1564)	James Sandilands, 2nd Lord Torphichen	1579	1617	Died
Lord Torphichen (1564)	James Sandilands, 3rd Lord Torphichen	1617	1622	
Lord Paisley (1587)	Claud Hamilton, 1st Lord Paisley	1587	1621	
Lord Maitland (1590)	John Maitland, 2nd Lord Maitland of Thirlestane	1595	1645	Created Viscount Lauderdale, see above
Lord Spynie (1590)	Alexander Lindsay, 2nd Lord Spynie	1607	1646	
Lord Roxburghe (1600)	Robert Ker, 1st Lord Roxburghe	1600	1650	Created Earl of Roxburghe, see above
Lord Lindores (1600)	Patrick Leslie, 2nd Lord Lindores	1608	1649	
Lord Campbell of Loudoun (1601)	Hugh Campbell, 1st Lord Campbell of Loudoun	1601	1619	Resigned
Lord Campbell of Loudoun (1601)	John Campbell, 2nd Lord Campbell of Loudoun	1619	1662	
Lord Kinloss (1602)	Edward Bruce, 1st Lord Kinloss	1602	1611	Died
Lord Kinloss (1602)	Edward Bruce, 2nd Lord Kinloss	1611	1613	Died
Lord Kinloss (1602)	Thomas Bruce, 3rd Lord Kinloss	1613	1663	
Lord Colville of Culross (1604)	James Colville, 1st Lord Colville of Culross	1604	1629	
Lord Scone (1605)	David Murray, 1st Lord Scone	1605	1631	
Lord Balmerinoch (1606)	James Elphinstone, 1st Lord Balmerinoch	1606	1612	Died
Lord Balmerinoch (1606)	John Elphinstone, 2nd Lord Balmerino	1612	1649	
Lord Blantyre (1606)	Walter Stewart, 1st Lord Blantyre	1606	1617	Died
Lord Blantyre (1606)	William Stewart, 2nd Lord Blantyre	1617	1638	
Lord Scott of Buccleuch (1606)	Walter Scott, 1st Lord Scott of Buccleuch	1606	1611	Died
Lord Scott of Buccleuch (1606)	Walter Scott, 2nd Lord Scott of Buccleuch	1611	1633	Created Earl of Buccleuch in 1619, see above
Lord Coupar (1607)	James Elphinstone, 1st Lord Coupar	1607	1669	
Lord Holyroodhouse (1607)	John Bothwell, 2nd Lord Holyroodhouse	1609	1638	
Lord Garlies (1607)	Alexander Stewart, 1st Lord Garlies	1607	1649	
Lord Balfour of Burleigh (1607)	Michael Balfour, 1st Lord Balfour of Burleigh	1607	1619	Died
Lord Balfour of Burleigh (1607)	Robert Balfour, 2nd Lord Balfour of Burleigh	1619	1663	
Lord Cranstoun (1609)	William Cranstoun, 1st Lord Cranstoun	1609	1627	
Lord Mackenzie of Kintail (1609)	Kenneth Mackenzie, 1st Lord Mackenzie of Kintail	1609	1611	Died
Lord Mackenzie of Kintail (1609)	Colin Mackenzie, 2nd Lord Mackenzie of Kintail	1611	1633	
Lord Pittenweem (1609)	Frederick Stewart, 1st Lord Pittenweem	1609	1625	
Lord Maderty (1609)	James Drummond, 1st Lord Madderty	1609	1623	
Lord Dingwall (1609)	Richard Preston, 1st Lord Dingwall	1609	1628	
Lord Saint Colme (1611)	Henry Stewart, 1st Lord Saint Colme	1611	1612	New creation, died
Lord Saint Colme (1611)	James Stewart, 2nd Lord Saint Colme	1612	1620	
Lord Ogilvy of Deskford (1616)	Walter Ogilvy, 1st Lord Ogilvy of Deskford	1616	1626	New creation
Lord Carnegie (1616)	David Carnegie, 1st Lord Carnegie	1616	1658	New creation
Lord Melville of Monymaill (1616)	Robert Melville, 1st Lord Melville	1616	1621	New creation
Lord Ramsay of Dalhousie (1618)	George Ramsay, 1st Lord Ramsay of Dalhousie	1618	Bef 1629	New creation

== Peerage of Ireland ==
Title	Holder	Date gained	Date lost	Notes
Earl of Kildare (1316)	Gerald FitzGerald, 14th Earl of Kildare	1599	1612	Died
Earl of Kildare (1316)	Gerald FitzGerald, 15th Earl of Kildare	1612	1620	
Earl of Ormond (1328)	Thomas Butler, 10th Earl of Ormond	1546	1614	Died
Earl of Ormond (1328)	Walter Butler, 11th Earl of Ormond	1614	1633	
Earl of Waterford (1446)	Gilbert Talbot, 7th Earl of Waterford	1590	1616	Died
Earl of Waterford (1446)	Edward Talbot, 8th Earl of Waterford	1616	1617	Died
Earl of Waterford (1446)	George Talbot, 9th Earl of Waterford	1617	1630	
Earl of Clanricarde (1543)	Richard Burke, 4th Earl of Clanricarde	1601	1635	
Earl of Thomond (1543)	Donogh O'Brien, 4th Earl of Thomond	1581	1624	
Earl of Castlehaven (1616)	George Tuchet, 1st Earl of Castlehaven	1616	1617	New creation; died
Earl of Castlehaven (1616)	Mervyn Tuchet, 2nd Earl of Castlehaven	1617	1630	
Earl of Desmond (1619)	Richard Preston, 1st Earl of Desmond	1619	1628	
Viscount Gormanston (1478)	Jenico Preston, 5th Viscount Gormanston	1599	1630	
Viscount Buttevant (1541)	David de Barry, 5th Viscount Buttevant	1581	1617	Died
Viscount Buttevant (1541)	David Barry, 6th Viscount Buttevant	1617	1642	
Viscount Mountgarret (1550)	Richard Butler, 3rd Viscount Mountgarret	1602	1651	
Viscount Butler of Tulleophelim (1603)	Theobald Butler, 1st Viscount Butler of Tulleophelim	1603	1613	Died, title extinct
Viscount Powerscourt (1618)	Richard Wingfield, 1st Viscount Powerscourt	1618	1634	New creation
Viscount Dunluce (1618)	Randal MacDonnell, 1st Viscount Dunluce	1618	1636	New creation
Baron Athenry (1172)	Edmond I de Bermingham	1580	1612	Died
Baron Athenry (1172)	Richard III de Bermingham	1612	1645	
Baron Kingsale (1223)	John de Courcy, 18th Baron Kingsale	1599	1628	
Baron Kerry (1223)	Thomas Fitzmaurice, 18th Baron Kerry	1600	1630	
Baron Slane (1370)	William Fleming, 11th Baron Slane	1597	1612	Died
Baron Slane (1370)	Christopher Fleming, 12th Baron Slane	1612	1625	
Baron Howth (1425)	Christopher St Lawrence, 10th Baron Howth	1606	1619	Died
Baron Howth (1425)	Nicholas St Lawrence, 11th Baron Howth	1619	1643	
Baron Killeen (1449)	Christopher Plunkett, 9th Baron Killeen	1595	1613	Died
Baron Killeen (1449)	Luke Plunkett, 10th Baron Killeen	1613	1637	
Baron Trimlestown (1461)	Robert Barnewall, 7th Baron Trimlestown	1598	1639	
Baron Dunsany (1462)	Patrick Plunkett, 9th Baron of Dunsany	1603	1668	
Baron Delvin (1486)	Richard Nugent, 7th Baron Delvin	1602	1642	
Baron Power (1535)	John Power, 5th Baron Power	1607	1661	
Baron Dunboyne (1541)	James Butler, 2nd/12th Baron Dunboyne	1566	1624	
Baron Louth (1541)	Matthew Plunkett, 5th Baron Louth	1607	1629	
Baron Upper Ossory (1541)	Florence Fitzpatrick, 3rd Baron Upper Ossory	1581	1613	Died
Baron Upper Ossory (1541)	Teige Fitzpatrick, 4th Baron Upper Ossory	1613	1627	
Baron Inchiquin (1543)	Dermod O'Brien, 5th Baron Inchiquin	1597	1624	
Baron Bourke of Castleconnell (1580)	Edmund Bourke, 5th Baron Bourke of Connell	1599	1635	
Baron Cahir (1583)	Thomas Butler, 2nd Baron Cahir	1596	1627	
Baron Chichester (1613)	Arthur Chichester, 1st Baron Chichester	1613	1625	New creation
Baron Ardee (1616)	Edward Brabazon, 1st Baron Ardee	1616	1625	New creation
Baron Boyle (1616)	Richard Boyle, 1st Baron Boyle	1616	1643	New creation
Baron Moore (1616)	Garret Moore, 1st Baron Moore	1616	1627	New creation
Baron Ridgeway (1616)	Thomas Ridgeway, 1st Baron Ridgeway	1616	1631	New creation
Baron Hamilton (1617)	James Hamilton, 2nd Baron Hamilton	1617	1633	New creation
Baron Bourke of Brittas (1618)	Theobald Bourke, 1st Baron Bourke of Brittas	1618	1654	New creation
Baron Lambart (1618)	Oliver Lambart, 1st Baron Lambart	1618	1618	New creation; died
Baron Lambart (1618)	Charles Lambart, 2nd Baron Lambart	1618	1660	
Baron Mountjoy (1618)	Mountjoy Blount, 1st Baron Mountjoy	1618	1665	New creation
Baron Balfour (1619)	James Balfour, 1st Baron Balfour of Glenawley	1619	1634	New creation
Baron Castle Stewart (1619)	Andrew Stuart, 1st Baron Castle Stuart	1619	1629	New creation
Baron Dillon (1619)	James Dillon, 1st Baron Dillon	1619	1642	New creation

Preceded by List of peers 1600–1609	Lists of peers by decade 1600–1609	Succeeded by List of peers 1620–1629
