= List of peers 1620–1629 =

This page lists all peers who held extant titles between 1620 and 1629.

== Peerage of England ==
Title	Holder	Date gained	Date lost	Notes
Duke of Cornwall (1337)	Prince Charles	1612	1625	1st Duke of York; Ascended the Throne, and all his honours merged in the Crown
Duke of Cornwall (1337)	Prince Charles James	1629	1629	Died, and the Dukedom lapsed to the Crown
Duke of Richmond (1623)	Ludovic Stuart, 1st Duke of Richmond	1623	1624	New creation; died, title extinct
Duke of Buckingham (1623)	George Villiers, 1st Duke of Buckingham	1623	1628	New creation for the 1st Marquess of Buckingham; died
Duke of Buckingham (1623)	George Villiers, 2nd Duke of Buckingham	1628	1687	
Marquess of Winchester (1551)	William Paulet, 4th Marquess of Winchester	1598	1628	Died
Marquess of Winchester (1551)	John Paulet, 5th Marquess of Winchester	1628	1675	
Earl of Arundel (1138)	Thomas Howard, 21st Earl of Arundel	1604	1646	
Earl of Oxford (1142)	Henry de Vere, 18th Earl of Oxford	1604	1625	Died
Earl of Oxford (1142)	Robert de Vere, 19th Earl of Oxford	1625	1632	
Earl of Shrewsbury (1442)	George Talbot, 9th Earl of Shrewsbury	1617	1630	
Earl of Kent (1465)	Charles Grey, 7th Earl of Kent	1615	1623	Died
Earl of Kent (1465)	Henry Grey, 8th Earl of Kent	1623	1639	
Earl of Derby (1485)	William Stanley, 6th Earl of Derby	1594	1642	
Earl of Worcester (1514)	Edward Somerset, 4th Earl of Worcester	1589	1628	Died
Earl of Worcester (1514)	Henry Somerset, 5th Earl of Worcester	1628	1646	
Earl of Cumberland (1525)	Francis Clifford, 4th Earl of Cumberland	1605	1641	
Earl of Rutland (1525)	Francis Manners, 6th Earl of Rutland	1612	1632	
Earl of Huntingdon (1529)	Henry Hastings, 5th Earl of Huntingdon	1604	1643	
Earl of Sussex (1529)	Robert Radclyffe, 5th Earl of Sussex	1593	1629	Died
Earl of Sussex (1529)	Edward Radclyffe, 6th Earl of Sussex	1629	1643	
Earl of Bath (1536)	William Bourchier, 3rd Earl of Bath	1561	1623	Died
Earl of Bath (1536)	Edward Bourchier, 4th Earl of Bath	1623	1636	
Earl of Southampton (1547)	Henry Wriothesley, 3rd Earl of Southampton	1581	1624	Died
Earl of Southampton (1547)	Thomas Wriothesley, 4th Earl of Southampton	1624	1667	
Earl of Bedford (1550)	Edward Russell, 3rd Earl of Bedford	1585	1627	Died
Earl of Bedford (1550)	Francis Russell, 4th Earl of Bedford	1627	1641	
Earl of Pembroke (1551)	William Herbert, 3rd Earl of Pembroke	1601	1630	
Earl of Devon (1553)	William Courtenay, de jure 3rd Earl of Devon	1557	1630	
Earl of Northumberland (1557)	Henry Percy, 9th Earl of Northumberland	1585	1632	
Earl of Hertford (1559)	Edward Seymour, 1st Earl of Hertford	1559	1621	Died
Earl of Hertford (1559)	William Seymour, 2nd Earl of Herford	1621	1660	
Earl of Essex (1572)	Robert Devereux, 3rd Earl of Essex	1604	1646	
Earl of Lincoln (1572)	Theophilus Clinton, 4th Earl of Lincoln	1619	1667	
Earl of Nottingham (1596)	Charles Howard, 1st Earl of Nottingham	1596	1624	Died
Earl of Nottingham (1596)	Charles Howard, 2nd Earl of Nottingham	1624	1642	
Earl of Suffolk (1603)	Thomas Howard, 1st Earl of Suffolk	1603	1626	Died
Earl of Suffolk (1603)	Theophilus Howard, 2nd Earl of Suffolk	1626	1640	
Earl of Dorset (1604)	Richard Sackville, 3rd Earl of Dorset	1609	1624	Died
Earl of Dorset (1604)	Edward Sackville, 4th Earl of Dorset	1624	1652	
Earl of Exeter (1605)	Thomas Cecil, 1st Earl of Exeter	1605	1623	Died
Earl of Exeter (1605)	William Cecil, 2nd Earl of Exeter	1623	1640	
Earl of Montgomery (1605)	Philip Herbert, 1st Earl of Montgomery	1605	1649	
Earl of Salisbury (1605)	William Cecil, 2nd Earl of Salisbury	1612	1668	
Earl of Richmond (1613)	Ludovic Stewart, 1st Earl of Richmond	1613	1624	Created Duke of Richmond, see above
Earl of Somerset (1613)	Robert Carr, 1st Earl of Somerset	1613	1645	
Earl of Bridgewater (1617)	John Egerton, 1st Earl of Bridgewater	1617	1649	
Countess of Buckingham (1618)	Mary Villiers, Countess of Buckingham	1618	1632	
Earl of Northampton (1618)	William Compton, 1st Earl of Northampton	1618	1630	
Earl of Leicester (1618)	Robert Sidney, 1st Earl of Leicester	1618	1626	Died
Earl of Leicester (1618)	Robert Sidney, 2nd Earl of Leicester	1626	1677	
Earl of Warwick (1618)	Robert Rich, 2nd Earl of Warwick	1618	1658	
Earl of Devonshire (1618)	William Cavendish, 1st Earl of Devonshire	1618	1626	Died
Earl of Devonshire (1618)	William Cavendish, 2nd Earl of Devonshire	1626	1628	Died
Earl of Devonshire (1618)	William Cavendish, 3rd Earl of Devonshire	1628	1684	
Earl of March (1619)	Esmé Stewart, 1st Earl of March	1619	1624	Succeeded to the Dukedom of Lennox (Peerage of Scotland); died
Earl of March (1619)	James Stewart, 2nd Earl of March	1624	1655	Duke of Lennox in the Peerage of Scotland
Earl of Cambridge (1619)	James Hamilton, 1st Earl of Cambridge	1619	1625	Marquess of Hamilton in the Peerage of Scotland; died
Earl of Cambridge (1619)	James Hamilton, 2nd Earl of Cambridge	1625	1649	Marquess of Hamilton in the Peerage of Scotland
Earl of Warwick (1621)	John Ramsay, 1st Earl of Holderness	1621	1626	New creation; died, title extinct
Earl of Berkshire (1621)	Francis Norris, 1st Earl of Berkshire	1621	1622	New creation; died, title extinct
Earl of Carlisle (1622)	James Hay, 1st Earl of Carlisle	1622	1636	New creation
Earl of Denbigh (1622)	William Feilding, 1st Earl of Denbigh	1622	1643	New creation; Viscount Feilding in 1620
Earl of Bristol (1622)	John Digby, 1st Earl of Bristol	1622	1653	New creation
Earl of Middlesex (1622)	Lionel Cranfield, 1st Earl of Middlesex	1622	1645	New creation; Baron Cranfield in 1621
Earl of Anglesey (1623)	Christopher Villiers, 1st Earl of Anglesey	1623	1630	New creation
Earl of Holland (1624)	Henry Rich, 1st Earl of Holland	1624	1649	New creation; Baron Kensington in 1623
Earl of Clare (1624)	John Holles, 1st Earl of Clare	1624	1637	New creation
Earl of Bolingbroke (1624)	Oliver St John, 1st Earl of Bolingbroke	1624	1646	New creation
Earl of Westmorland (1624)	Francis Fane, 1st Earl of Westmorland	1624	1629	New creation
Earl of Westmorland (1624)	Mildmay Fane, 2nd Earl of Westmorland	1629	1666	
Earl of Cleveland (1626)	Thomas Wentworth, 1st Earl of Cleveland	1626	1667	New creation
Earl of Danby (1626)	Henry Danvers, 1st Earl of Danby	1626	1644	New creation
Earl of Manchester (1626)	Henry Montagu, 1st Earl of Manchester	1626	1642	New creation; Viscount Mandeville in 1620
Earl of Marlborough (1626)	James Ley, 1st Earl of Marlborough	1626	1629	New creation; Baron Ley in 1624; died
Earl of Marlborough (1626)	Henry Ley, 2nd Earl of Marlborough	1629	1638	
Earl of Mulgrave (1626)	Edmund Sheffield, 1st Earl of Mulgrave	1626	1646	New creation
Earl of Totness (1626)	George Carew, 1st Earl of Totnes	1626	1629	New creation; died, title extinct
Earl of Berkshire (1626)	Thomas Howard, 1st Earl of Berkshire	1626	1669	New creation; Viscount Andover in 1622
Earl of Monmouth (1626)	Robert Carey, 1st Earl of Monmouth	1626	1639	New creation; Baron Carey in 1622
Earl of Banbury (1626)	William Knollys, 1st Earl of Banbury	1626	1632	New creation
Earl of Norwich (1626)	Edward Denny, 1st Earl of Norwich	1626	1637	New creation
Earl Rivers (1626)	Thomas Darcy, 1st Earl Rivers	1626	1640	New creation; Viscount Colchester in 1621
Earl of Lindsey (1626)	Robert Bertie, 1st Earl of Lindsey	1626	1642	New creation
Earl of Sunderland (1627)	Emanuel Scrope, 1st Earl of Sunderland	1627	1630	New creation
Earl of Newcastle-upon-Tyne (1628)	William Cavendish, 1st Earl of Newcastle-upon-Tyne	1628	1676	New creation; Viscount Mansfield in 1620
Earl of Dover (1628)	Henry Carey, 1st Earl of Dover	1628	1666	New creation; Viscount Rochford in 1621
Earl of Peterborough (1628)	John Mordaunt, 1st Earl of Peterborough	1628	1643	New creation
Earl of Stamford (1628)	Henry Grey, 1st Earl of Stamford	1628	1673	New creation
Earl of Winchilsea (1628)	Elizabeth Finch, 1st Countess of Winchilsea	1628	1634	New creation; Viscountess Maidstone in 1623
Earl of Kingston-upon-Hull (1628)	Robert Pierrepont, 1st Earl of Kingston-upon-Hull	1628	1643	New creation; Viscount Newark in 1627
Earl of Carnarvon (1628)	Robert Dormer, 1st Earl of Carnarvon	1628	1643	New creation
Earl of Newport (1628)	Mountjoy Blount, 1st Earl of Newport	1628	1666	New creation; Baron Mountjoy in 1627
Earl of Chesterfield (1628)	Philip Stanhope, 1st Earl of Chesterfield	1628	1656	New creation
Earl of Thanet (1628)	Nicholas Tufton, 1st Earl of Thanet	1628	1632	New creation; Baron Tufton in 1626
Earl of St Albans (1628)	Richard Burke, 1st Earl of St Albans	1628	1635	New creation; also Earl of Clanricarde in the Peerage of Ireland; Viscount Tunbridge in 1624
Viscount Montagu (1554)	Anthony-Maria Browne, 2nd Viscount Montagu	1592	1629	Died
Viscount Montagu (1554)	Francis Browne, 3rd Viscount Montagu	1629	1682	
Viscount Wallingford (1616)	William Knollys, 1st Viscount Wallingford	1616	1632	Created Earl of Banbury, see above
Viscount Doncaster (1618)	James Hay, 1st Viscount Doncaster	1618	1636	Created Earl of Carlisle, see above
Viscount Purbeck (1618)	John Villiers, 1st Viscount Purbeck	1619	1657	New creation
Viscount St Alban (1621)	Francis Bacon, 1st Viscount St Albans	1621	1626	New creation; died, title extinct
Viscount Saye and Sele (1624)	William Fiennes, 1st Viscount Saye and Sele	1624	1662	New creation
Viscount Wimbledon (1625)	Edward Cecil, 1st Viscount Wimbledon	1625	1638	New creation
Viscount Savage (1626)	Thomas Savage, 1st Viscount Savage	1626	1635	New creation
Viscount Conway (1627)	Edward Conway, 1st Viscount Conway	1627	1631	New creation; Baron Conway in 1625
Viscount Bayning (1628)	Paul Bayning, 1st Viscount Bayning	1628	1629	New creation; died
Viscount Bayning (1628)	Paul Bayning, 2nd Viscount Bayning	1629	1638	
Viscount Campden (1628)	Baptist Hicks, 1st Viscount Campden	1628	1629	New creation; died
Viscount Campden (1628)	Edward Noel, 2nd Viscount Campden	1629	1643	
Viscount Dorchester (1628)	Dudley Carleton, 1st Viscount Dorchester	1628	1632	New creation; Baron Carleton in 1626
Viscount Wentworth (1628)	Thomas Wentworth, 1st Viscount Wentworth	1628	1641	New creation; Baron Wentworth in 1628
Baron le Despencer (1264)	Mary Fane, 3rd Baroness le Despenser	1604	1626	Died; Barony succeeded by the Earl of Westmorland, and held by his heirs until 1762, when it fell into abeyance
Baron de Clifford (1299)	Anne Clifford, 14th Baroness de Clifford	1605	1676	
Baron Morley (1299)	William Parker, 13th Baron Morley	1618	1622	Died
Baron Morley (1299)	Henry Parker, 14th Baron Morley	1622	1655	
Baron Zouche of Haryngworth (1308)	Edward la Zouche, 11th Baron Zouche	1569	1625	Died, Barony fell into abeyance, until terminated in 1815
Baron Willoughby de Eresby (1313)	Robert Bertie, 14th Baron Willoughby de Eresby	1601	1640	Created Earl of Lindsey in 1626, Barony held by his heirs until 1779
Baron Dacre (1321)	Richard Lennard, 13th Baron Dacre	1616	1630	
Baron Scrope of Bolton (1371)	Emanuel Scrope, 11th Baron Scrope of Bolton	1609	1630	Created Earl of Sunderland in 1627, on his death, the Earldom became extinct, and Barony dormant
Baron Berkeley (1421)	George Berkeley, 8th Baron Berkeley	1613	1658	
Baron Dudley (1440)	Edward Sutton, 5th Baron Dudley	1586	1643	
Baron Saye and Sele (1447)	William Fiennes, 8th Baron Saye and Sele	1613	1662	Created Viscount Saye and Sele in 1624, Barony held by his heirs, until 1781, when both titles became extinct
Baron Stourton (1448)	Edward Stourton, 10th Baron Stourton	1588	1633	
Baron Ogle (1461)	Catherine Ogle, 8th Baroness Ogle	1626	1629	Abeyance resolved; died, Barony succeeded by the Earl of Newcastle, and held by his heir until 1691, when it fell into abeyance
Baron Willoughby de Broke (1491)	Fulke Greville, 5th Baron Willoughby de Broke	1606	1628	Died
Baron Willoughby de Broke (1491)	Margaret Greville, 6th Baroness Willoughby de Broke	1628	1631	
Baron Monteagle (1514)	William Parker, 4th Baron Monteagle	1581	1622	Died
Baron Monteagle (1514)	Henry Parker, 5th Baron Monteagle	1622	1655	
Baron Vaux of Harrowden (1523)	Edward Vaux, 4th Baron Vaux of Harrowden	1595	1661	
Baron Sandys of the Vine (1529)	William Sandys, 3rd Baron Sandys	1560	1623	Died
Baron Sandys of the Vine (1529)	William Sandys, 4th Baron Sandys	1623	1629	Died
Baron Sandys of the Vine (1529)	Elizabeth Sandys, 5th Baroness Sandys	1629	1645	
Baron Windsor (1529)	Thomas Windsor, 6th Baron Windsor	1605	1642	
Baron Wentworth (1529)	Thomas Wentworth, 4th Baron Wentworth	1593	1667	Created Earl of Cleveland, see above
Baron Mordaunt (1532)	John Mordaunt, 5th Baron Mordaunt	1601	1644	Created Earl of Peterborough; Barony held by his heirs until 1697
Baron Cromwell (1540)	Thomas Cromwell, 4th Baron Cromwell	1607	1653	Created Viscount Lecale in the Peerage of Ireland in 1624, Barony held by his heirs
Baron Eure (1544)	William Eure, 4th Baron Eure	1617	1646	
Baron Wharton (1545)	Philip Wharton, 3rd Baron Wharton	1572	1625	Died
Baron Wharton (1545)	Philip Wharton, 4th Baron Wharton	1625	1695	
Baron Sheffield (1547)	Edmund Sheffield, 3rd Baron Sheffield	1568	1646	Created Earl of Mulgrave, see above
Baron Willoughby of Parham (1547)	Francis Willoughby, 5th Baron Willoughby of Parham	1618	1666	
Baron Darcy of Aston (1548)	John Darcy, 3rd Baron Darcy of Aston	1602	1635	
Baron Darcy of Chiche (1551)	Thomas Darcy, 3rd Baron Darcy of Chiche	1581	1640	Created Earl Rivers in 1626, see above
Baron Paget (1552)	William Paget, 4th Baron Paget	1604	1629	Died
Baron Paget (1552)	William Paget, 5th Baron Paget	1629	1678	
Baron North (1554)	Dudley North, 3rd Baron North	1600	1666	
Baron Chandos (1554)	Grey Brydges, 5th Baron Chandos	1602	1621	Died
Baron Chandos (1554)	George Brydges, 6th Baron Chandos	1621	1655	
Baron Hunsdon (1559)	Henry Carey, 4th Baron Hunsdon	1617	1666	Created Earl of Dover in 1628, see above
Baron St John of Bletso (1559)	Oliver St John, 4th Baron St John of Bletso	1618	1646	Created Earl of Bolingbroke in 1624, see above
Baron De La Warr (1570)	Henry West, 4th Baron De La Warr	1618	1628	Died
Baron De La Warr (1570)	Charles West, 5th Baron De La Warr	1628	1687	
Baron Norreys (1572)	Francis Norris, 2nd Baron Norreys	1601	1622	Created Earl of Berkshire, and died on the following day
Baron Norreys (1572)	Elizabeth Wray, 3rd Baroness Norreys	1622	1645	
Baron (A)bergavenny (1604)	Edward Nevill, 1st Baron Bergavenny	1604	1622	Died
Baron (A)bergavenny (1604)	Henry Nevill, 2nd Baron Bergavenny	1622	1641	
Baron Danvers (1603)	Henry Danvers, 1st Baron Danvers	1603	1644	Created Earl of Danby, see above
Baron Gerard (1603)	Gilbert Gerard, 2nd Baron Gerard	1617	1622	
Baron Gerard (1603)	Dutton Gerard, 3rd Baron Gerard	1622	1640	
Baron Grey of Groby (1603)	Henry Grey, 2nd Baron Grey of Groby	1614	1673	Created Earl of Stamford, see above
Baron Petre (1603)	William Petre, 2nd Baron Petre	1613	1637	
Baron Russell of Thornhaugh (1603)	Francis Russell, 2nd Baron Russell of Thornhaugh	1613	1641	Succeeded as Earl of Bedford, see above
Baron Spencer (1603)	Robert Spencer, 1st Baron Spencer of Wormleighton	1603	1627	Died
Baron Spencer (1603)	William Spencer, 2nd Baron Spencer of Wormleighton	1627	1636	
Baron Wotton (1603)	Edward Wotton, 1st Baron Wotton	1603	1628	Died
Baron Wotton (1603)	Thomas Wotton, 2nd Baron Wotton	1628	1630	
Baron Denny (1604)	Edward Denny, 1st Baron Denny	1604	1630	Created Earl of Norwich, see above
Baron Arundell of Wardour (1605)	Thomas Arundell, 1st Baron Arundell of Wardour	1605	1639	
Baron Carew (1605)	George Carew, 1st Baron Carew	1605	1629	Created Earl of Totness, see above
Baron Stanhope of Harrington (1605)	John Stanhope, 1st Baron Stanhope	1605	1621	Died
Baron Stanhope of Harrington (1605)	Charles Stanhope, 2nd Baron Stanhope	1621	1675	
Baron Knyvett (1607)	Thomas Knyvet, 1st Baron Knyvet	1607	1622	Died, title extinct
Baron Clifton (1608)	Katherine Clifton, 2nd Baroness Clifton	1618	1637	
Baron Dormer (1615)	Robert Dormer, 2nd Baron Dormer	1616	1643	Created Earl of Carnarvon, see above
Baron Teynham (1616)	Christopher Roper, 2nd Baron Teynham	1618	1622	Died
Baron Teynham (1616)	John Roper, 3rd Baron Teynham	1622	1628	Died
Baron Teynham (1616)	John Roper, 3rd Baron Teynham	1628	1673	
Baron Houghton (1616)	John Holles, 1st Baron Houghton	1616	1637	Created Earl of Clare, see above
Baron Stanhope of Shelford (1616)	Philip Stanhope, 1st Baron Stanhope of Shelford	1616	1656	Created Earl of Chesterfield, see above
Baron Noel (1617)	Edward Noel, 1st Baron Noel	1617	1643	Succeeded as Viscount Campden, see above
Baron Verulam (1618)	Francis Bacon, 1st Baron Verulam	1618	1626	Created Viscount St Alban, see above
Baron Digby (1618)	John Digby, 1st Baron Digby	1618	1653	Created Earl of Bristol, see above
Baron Brooke (1621)	Fulke Greville, 1st Baron Brooke	1621	1628	New creation, died
Baron Brooke (1621)	Robert Greville, 2nd Baron Brooke	1628	1643	
Baron Montagu of Boughton (1621)	Edward Montagu, 1st Baron Montagu of Boughton	1621	1644	New creation
Baron Grey of Warke (1624)	William Grey, 1st Baron Grey of Werke	1624	1674	New creation
Baron Deincourt (1624)	Francis Leke, 1st Baron Deincourt	1624	1655	New creation
Baron Robartes (1625)	Richard Robartes, 1st Baron Robartes	1625	1634	New creation
Baron Craven (1627)	Willian Craven, 1st Baron Craven	1627	1697	New creation
Baron Fauconberg (1627)	Thomas Belasyse, 1st Baron Fauconberg	1627	1653	New creation
Baron Lovelace (1627)	Richard Lovelace, 1st Baron Lovelace	1627	1634	New creation
Baron Poulett (1627)	John Poulett, 1st Baron Poulett	1627	1649	New creation
Baron Clifford (1628)	Henry Clifford, 1st Baron Clifford	1628	1643	New creation
Baron Brudenell (1628)	Thomas Brudenell, 1st Baron Brudenell	1628	1663	New creation
Baron Hervey (1628)	William Hervey, 1st Baron Hervey	1628	1642	New creation; also Baron Hervey in the Peerage of Ireland
Baron Strange (1628)	James Stanley, 1st Baron Strange	1628	1651	New creation
Baron Maynard (1628)	William Maynard, 1st Baron Maynard	1628	1640	New creation; also Baron Maynard in the Peerage of Ireland
Baron Coventry (1628)	Thomas Coventry, 1st Baron Coventry	1628	1640	New creation
Baron Weston (1628)	Richard Weston, 1st Baron Weston	1628	1635	New creation
Baron Goring (1628)	George Goring, 1st Baron Goring	1628	1644	New creation
Baron Mohun of Okehampton (1628)	John Mohun, 1st Baron Mohun of Okehampton	1628	1640	New creation
Baron Savile (1628)	John Savile, 1st Baron Savile of Pontefract	1628	1630	New creation
Baron Boteler (1628)	John Boteler, 1st Baron Boteler of Brantfield	1628	1637	New creation
Baron Dunsmore (1628)	Francis Leigh, 1st Baron Dunsmore	1628	1653	New creation
Baron Powis (1629)	William Herbert, 1st Baron Powis	1629	1655	New creation
Baron Herbert of Chirbury (1629)	Edward Herbert, 1st Baron Herbert of Cherbury	1629	1648	New creation

== Peerage of Scotland ==
Title	Holder	Date gained	Date lost	Notes
Duke of Rothesay (1398)	Charles Stuart, Duke of Rothesay	1612	1625	Acceded to the Throne of England and Scotland
Duke of Rothesay (1398)	Charles James Stuart, Duke of Rothesay	1629	1629	Died
Duke of Lennox (1581)	Ludovic Stewart, 2nd Duke of Lennox	1583	1624	Died
Duke of Lennox (1581)	Esmé Stewart, 3rd Duke of Lennox	1624	1624	Died
Duke of Lennox (1581)	James Stewart, 4th Duke of Lennox	1624	1655	
Marquess of Huntly (1599)	George Gordon, 1st Marquess of Huntly	1599	1636	
Marquess of Hamilton (1599)	James Hamilton, 2nd Marquess of Hamilton	1604	1625	Died
Marquess of Hamilton (1599)	James Hamilton, 3rd Marquess of Hamilton	1625	1649	
Earl of Angus (1389)	William Douglas, 11th Earl of Angus	1611	1660	
Earl of Argyll (1457)	Archibald Campbell, 7th Earl of Argyll	1584	1638	
Earl of Crawford (1398)	David Lindsay, 12th Earl of Crawford	1607	1620	Died
Earl of Crawford (1398)	Henry Lindsay, 13th Earl of Crawford	1620	1622	Died
Earl of Crawford (1398)	George Lindsay, 14th Earl of Crawford	1622	1633	
Earl of Erroll (1452)	Francis Hay, 9th Earl of Erroll	1585	1631	
Earl Marischal (1458)	George Keith, 5th Earl Marischal	1581	1623	Died
Earl Marischal (1458)	William Keith, 6th Earl Marischal	1623	1635	
Earl of Sutherland (1235)	John Gordon, 14th Earl of Sutherland	1615	1679	
Earl of Mar (1114)	John Erskine, 19th/2nd Earl of Mar	1572	1634	
Earl of Rothes (1458)	John Leslie, 6th Earl of Rothes	1611	1641	
Earl of Morton (1458)	William Douglas, 7th Earl of Morton	1606	1648	
Earl of Menteith (1427)	William Graham, 7th Earl of Menteith	1598	1661	
Earl of Glencairn (1488)	James Cunningham, 7th Earl of Glencairn	1578	1630	
Earl of Eglinton (1507)	Alexander Montgomerie, 6th Earl of Eglinton	1612	1661	
Earl of Montrose (1503)	John Graham, 4th Earl of Montrose	1608	1626	Died
Earl of Montrose (1503)	James Graham, 5th Earl of Montrose	1626	1650	
Earl of Cassilis (1509)	John Kennedy, 6th Earl of Cassilis	1615	1668	
Earl of Caithness (1455)	George Sinclair, 5th Earl of Caithness	1582	1643	
Earl of Buchan (1469)	Mary Douglas, 6th Countess of Buchan	1601	1628	Died
Earl of Buchan (1469)	James Erskine, 7th Earl of Buchan	1628	1664	
Earl of Moray (1562)	James Stuart, 3rd Earl of Moray	1591	1638	
Earl of Atholl (1596)	James Stewart, 2nd Earl of Atholl	1603	1625	Died, title extinct
Earl of Linlithgow (1600)	Alexander Livingstone, 1st Earl of Linlithgow	1600	1621	Died
Earl of Linlithgow (1600)	Alexander Livingston, 2nd Earl of Linlithgow	1621	1650	
Earl of Winton (1600)	George Seton, 3rd Earl of Winton	1607	1650	
Earl of Home (1605)	James Home, 2nd Earl of Home	1619	1633	
Earl of Perth (1605)	John Drummond, 2nd Earl of Perth	1611	1662	
Earl of Dunfermline (1605)	Alexander Seton, 1st Earl of Dunfermline	1605	1622	Died
Earl of Dunfermline (1605)	Charles Seton, 2nd Earl of Dunfermline	1622	1672	
Earl of Wigtown (1606)	John Fleming, 2nd Earl of Wigtown	1619	1650	
Earl of Abercorn (1606)	James Hamilton, 2nd Earl of Abercorn	1618	1670	
Earl of Kinghorne (1606)	John Lyon, 2nd Earl of Kinghorne	1615	1646	
Earl of Lothian (1606)	Robert Kerr, 2nd Earl of Lothian	1609	1624	Died, title extinct
Earl of Tullibardine (1606)	William Murray, 2nd Earl of Tullibardine	1609	1626	Resigned his titles in favour of younger brother, see below
Earl of Roxburghe (1616)	Robert Ker, 1st Earl of Roxburghe	1616	1650	
Earl of Kellie (1619)	Thomas Erskine, 1st Earl of Kellie	1619	1639	
Earl of Buccleuch (1619)	Walter Scott, 1st Earl of Buccleuch	1619	1633	
Earl of Haddington (1619)	Thomas Hamilton, 1st Earl of Haddington	1619	1637	
Earl of Nithsdale (1620)	Robert Maxwell, 1st Earl of Nithsdale	1620	1646	New creation
Earl of Galloway (1623)	Alexander Stewart, 1st Earl of Galloway	1623	1649	New creation
Earl of Seaforth (1623)	Colin Mackenzie, 1st Earl of Seaforth	1623	1633	New creation
Earl of Lauderdale (1624)	John Maitland, 1st Earl of Lauderdale	1624	1645	New creation
Earl of Annandale (1625)	John Murray, 1st Earl of Annandale	1625	1640	New creation; also Viscount of Annand since 1622
Earl of Tullibardine (1628)	Patrick Murray, 1st Earl of Tullibardine	1628	1644	New creation
Earl of Carrick (1628)	John Stewart, 1st Earl of Carrick	1628	1646	New creation
Earl of Atholl (1629)	John Murray, 1st Earl of Atholl	1629	1642	New creation
Viscount of Haddington (1606)	John Ramsay, 1st Viscount of Haddington	1606	1626	Created Earl of Holderness, see above
Viscount of Lauderdale (1616)	John Maitland, 1st Viscount of Lauderdale	1616	1645	Created Earl of Lauderdale, see above
Viscount of Falkland (1620)	Henry Cary, 1st Viscount of Falkland	1620	1633	New creation
Viscount of Dunbar (1620)	Henry Constable, 1st Viscount of Dunbar	1620	1645	New creation
Viscount of Stormont (1621)	David Murray, 1st Viscount of Stormont	1621	1631	New creation
Viscount of Ayr (1622)	William Crichton, 1st Viscount of Ayr	1622	1643	New creation
Viscount of Dupplin (1627)	George Hay, 1st Viscount of Dupplin	1627	1634	New creation
Viscount of Melgum (1627)	John Gordon, 1st Viscount of Melgum	1627	1630	New creation
Viscount of Drumlanrig (1628)	William Douglas, 1st Viscount of Drumlanrig	1628	1640	New creation
Lord Somerville (1430)	Hugh Somerville, 9th Lord Somerville	1618	1640	
Lord Forbes (1442)	Arthur Forbes, 9th Lord Forbes	1606	1641	
Lord Maxwell (1445)	Robert Maxwell, 10th Lord Maxwell	1613	1646	Created Earl of Nithsdale, see above
Lord Lindsay of the Byres (1445)	John Lindsay, 10th Lord Lindsay	1619	1678	
Lord Saltoun (1445)	Alexander Abernethy, 9th Lord Saltoun	1612	1668	
Lord Gray (1445)	Andrew Gray, 7th Lord Gray	1611	1663	
Lord Sinclair (1449)	John Sinclair, 9th Lord Sinclair	1615	1676	
Lord Borthwick (1452)	John Borthwick, 8th Lord Borthwick	1599	1623	Died
Lord Borthwick (1452)	John Borthwick, 9th Lord Borthwick	1623	1675	
Lord Boyd (1454)	Robert Boyd, 7th Lord Boyd	1611	1628	Died
Lord Boyd (1454)	Robert Boyd, 8th Lord Boyd	1628	1640	
Lord Oliphant (1455)	Laurence Oliphant, 5th Lord Oliphant	1593	1631	
Lord Cathcart (1460)	Alan Cathcart, 5th Lord Cathcart	1618	1628	Died
Lord Cathcart (1460)	Alan Cathcart, 6th Lord Cathcart	1628	1709	
Lord Lovat (1464)	Simon Fraser, 6th Lord Lovat	1577	1633	
Lord Carlyle of Torthorwald (1473)	James Douglas, 6th Lord Carlyle	1605	1638	
Lord Crichton of Sanquhar (1488)	William Crichton, 9th Lord Crichton of Sanquhar	1612	1643	Created Viscount of Ayr, see above
Lord Hay of Yester (1488)	John Hay, 8th Lord Hay of Yester	1609	1653	
Lord Sempill (1489)	Hugh Sempill, 5th Lord Sempill	1611	1639	
Lord Herries of Terregles (1490)	John Maxwell, 6th Lord Herries of Terregles	1604	1631	
Lord Ogilvy of Airlie (1491)	James Ogilvy, 7th Lord Ogilvy of Airlie	1617	1665	
Lord Ross (1499)	James Ross, 6th Lord Ross	1595	1633	
Lord Elphinstone (1509)	Alexander, 4th Lord Elphinstone	1602	1638	
Lord Ochiltree (1543)	James Stewart, 4th Lord Ochiltree	1615	1658	
Lord Torphichen (1564)	James Sandilands, 3rd Lord Torphichen	1617	1622	
Lord Torphichen (1564)	John Sandilands, 4th Lord Torphichen	1622	1637	
Lord Paisley (1587)	Claud Hamilton, 1st Lord Paisley	1587	1621	Title succeeded by the Earl of Abercorn, see above
Lord Spynie (1590)	Alexander Lindsay, 2nd Lord Spynie	1607	1646	
Lord Lindores (1600)	Patrick Leslie, 2nd Lord Lindores	1608	1649	
Lord Campbell of Loudoun (1601)	John Campbell, 2nd Lord Campbell of Loudoun	1619	1662	
Lord Kinloss (1602)	Thomas Bruce, 3rd Lord Kinloss	1613	1663	
Lord Colville of Culross (1604)	James Colville, 1st Lord Colville of Culross	1604	1629	Died
Lord Colville of Culross (1604)	James Colville, 2nd Lord Colville of Culross	1629	1654	
Lord Scone (1605)	David Murray, 1st Lord Scone	1605	1631	Created Viscount Stormont, see above
Lord Balmerinoch (1606)	John Elphinstone, 2nd Lord Balmerino	1612	1649	
Lord Blantyre (1606)	William Stewart, 2nd Lord Blantyre	1617	1638	
Lord Coupar (1607)	James Elphinstone, 1st Lord Coupar	1607	1669	
Lord Holyroodhouse (1607)	John Bothwell, 2nd Lord Holyroodhouse	1609	1638	
Lord Garlies (1607)	Alexander Stewart, 1st Lord Garlies	1607	1649	Created Earl of Galloway, see above
Lord Balfour of Burleigh (1607)	Robert Balfour, 2nd Lord Balfour of Burleigh	1619	1663	
Lord Cranstoun (1609)	William Cranstoun, 1st Lord Cranstoun	1609	1627	Died
Lord Cranstoun (1609)	John Cranstoun, 2nd Lord Cranstoun	1627	1648	
Lord Mackenzie of Kintail (1609)	Colin Mackenzie, 2nd Lord Mackenzie of Kintail	1611	1633	Created Earl of Seaforth, see above
Lord Pittenweem (1609)	Frederick Stewart, 1st Lord Pittenweem	1609	1625	Died, title extinct
Lord Maderty (1609)	James Drummond, 1st Lord Madderty	1609	1623	Died
Lord Maderty (1609)	John Drummond, 2nd Lord Madderty	1623	1647	
Lord Dingwall (1609)	Richard Preston, 1st Lord Dingwall	1609	1628	Died
Lord Dingwall (1609)	Elizabeth Preston, 2nd Lady Dingwall	1628	1684	
Lord Saint Colme (1611)	James Stewart, 2nd Lord Saint Colme	1612	1620	Disinherited; lordship granted to the Earl of Moray
Lord Ogilvy of Deskford (1616)	Walter Ogilvy, 1st Lord Ogilvy of Deskford	1616	1626	Died
Lord Ogilvy of Deskford (1616)	James Ogilvy, 2nd Lord Ogilvy of Deskford	1626	1653	
Lord Carnegie (1616)	David Carnegie, 1st Lord Carnegie	1616	1658	
Lord Melville of Monymaill (1616)	Robert Melville, 1st Lord Melville	1616	1621	Died
Lord Melville of Monymaill (1616)	Robert Melville, 2nd Lord Melville	1621	1635	
Lord Ramsay of Dalhousie (1618)	George Ramsay, 1st Lord Ramsay of Dalhousie	1618	Bef 1629	Died
Lord Ramsay of Dalhousie (1618)	William Ramsay, 2nd Lord Ramsay of Dalhousie	Bef 1629	1672	
Lord Jedburgh (1622)	Andrew Ker, 1st Lord Jedburgh	1622	1633	New creation
Lord Kintyre (1626)	James Campbell, 1st Lord Kintyre	1626	1645	New creation
Lord Aston of Forfar (1627)	Walter Aston, 1st Lord Aston of Forfar	1627	1639	New creation
Lord Barrett (1627)	Edward Barrett, 1st Lord Barrett of Newburgh	1627	1645	New creation
Lord Fairfax of Cameron (1627)	Thomas Fairfax, 1st Lord Fairfax of Cameron	1627	1640	New creation
Lord Napier (1627)	Archibald Napier, 1st Lord Napier	1627	1645	New creation
Lord Reay (1628)	Donald Mackay, 1st Lord Reay	1628	1649	New creation
Lord Cramond (1628)	Elizabeth Richardson, 1st Lady Cramond	1628	1651	New creation
Lord Wemyss of Elcho (1628)	John Wemyss, 1st Lord Wemyss of Elcho	1628	1649	New creation

== Peerage of Ireland ==
Title	Holder	Date gained	Date lost	Notes
Earl of Kildare (1316)	Gerald FitzGerald, 15th Earl of Kildare	1612	1620	Died
Earl of Kildare (1316)	George FitzGerald, 16th Earl of Kildare	1620	1660	
Earl of Ormond (1328)	Walter Butler, 11th Earl of Ormond	1614	1633	
Earl of Waterford (1446)	George Talbot, 9th Earl of Waterford	1617	1630	
Earl of Clanricarde (1543)	Richard Burke, 4th Earl of Clanricarde	1601	1635	
Earl of Thomond (1543)	Donogh O'Brien, 4th Earl of Thomond	1581	1624	Died
Earl of Thomond (1543)	Henry O'Brien, 5th Earl of Thomond	1624	1639	
Earl of Castlehaven (1616)	Mervyn Tuchet, 2nd Earl of Castlehaven	1617	1630	
Earl of Desmond (1619)	Richard Preston, 1st Earl of Desmond	1619	1628	Died; title extinct
Earl of Cork (1620)	Richard Boyle, 1st Earl of Cork	1620	1643	New creation
Earl of Antrim (1620)	Randal MacDonnell, 1st Earl of Antrim	1620	1636	New creation
Earl of Westmeath (1621)	Richard Nugent, 1st Earl of Westmeath	1621	1642	New creation
Earl of Roscommon (1622)	James Dillon, 1st Earl of Roscommon	1622	1642	New creation
Earl of Londonderry (1622)	Thomas Ridgeway, 1st Earl of Londonderry	1622	1631	New creation
Earl of Meath (1627)	William Brabazon, 1st Earl of Meath	1627	1651	New creation
Earl of Barrymore (1628)	David Barry, 1st Earl of Barrymore	1628	1642	New creation
Earl of Carbery (1628)	John Vaughan, 1st Earl of Carbery	1628	1634	New creation; also created Baron Vaughan in 1621
Earl of Fingall (1628)	Luke Plunkett, 1st Earl of Fingall	1628	1637	New creation
Earl of Downe (1628)	William Pope, 1st Earl of Downe	1628	1640	New creation
Earl of Desmond (1628)	George Feilding, 1st Earl of Desmond	1628	1665	New creation; also created Viscount Callan in 1622
Viscount Gormanston (1478)	Jenico Preston, 5th Viscount Gormanston	1599	1630	
Viscount Buttevant (1541)	David Barry, 6th Viscount Buttevant	1617	1642	Created Earl of Barrymore, see above
Viscount Mountgarret (1550)	Richard Butler, 3rd Viscount Mountgarret	1602	1651	
Viscount Powerscourt (1618)	Richard Wingfield, 1st Viscount Powerscourt	1618	1634	
Viscount Dunluce (1618)	Randal MacDonnell, 1st Viscount Dunluce	1618	1636	Created Earl of Antrim, see above
Viscount Grandison (1621)	Oliver St John, 1st Viscount Grandison	1621	1630	New creation
Viscount Wilmot (1621)	Charles Wilmot, 1st Viscount Wilmot	1621	1644	New creation
Viscount Valentia (1621)	Henry Power, 1st Viscount Valentia	1621	1642	New creation
Viscount Moore (1621)	Garret Moore, 1st Viscount Moore	1621	1627	New creation; died
Viscount Moore (1621)	Charles Moore, 2nd Viscount Moore	1627	1643	
Viscount Dillon (1622)	Theobald Dillon, 1st Viscount Dillon	1622	1624	New creation; died
Viscount Dillon (1622)	Lucas Dillon, 2nd Viscount Dillon	1624	1629	Died
Viscount Dillon (1622)	Theobald Dillon, 3rd Viscount Dillon	1629	1630	
Viscount Loftus (1622)	Adam Loftus, 1st Viscount Loftus	1622	1643	New creation
Viscount Beaumont of Swords (1622)	Thomas Beaumont, 1st Viscount Beaumont of Swords	1622	1625	New creation; died
Viscount Beaumont of Swords (1622)	Sapcote Beaumont, 2nd Viscount Beaumont of Swords	1625	1658	
Viscount Netterville (1622)	Nicholas Netterville, 1st Viscount Netterville	1622	1654	New creation
Viscount Montgomery (1622)	Hugh Montgomery, 1st Viscount Montgomery	1622	1636	New creation
Viscount Claneboye (1622)	James Hamilton, 1st Viscount Claneboye	1622	1644	New creation
Viscount Magennis (1623)	Art Roe Magennis, 1st Viscount Magennis	1623	1629	New creation; died
Viscount Magennis (1623)	Hugh Magennis, 2nd Viscount Magennis	1629	1639	
Viscount Lecale (1624)	Thomas Cromwell, 1st Viscount Lecale	1624	1653	New creation
Viscount Chichester (1625)	Edward Chichester, 1st Viscount Chichester	1625	1648	New creation
Viscount Kilmorey (1625)	Robert Needham, 1st Viscount Kilmorey	1625	1631	New creation
Viscount Somerset (1626)	Thomas Somerset, 1st Viscount Somerset	1626	1649	New creation
Viscount Carlingford (1627)	Barnham Swift, 1st Viscount Carlingford	1627	1634	New creation
Viscount Baltinglass (1627)	Thomas Roper, 1st Viscount Baltinglass	1627	1637	New creation
Viscount Castleton (1627)	Nicholas Saunderson, 1st Viscount Castleton	1627	1630	New creation
Viscount Killultagh (1627)	Edward Conway, 1st Viscount Killultagh	1627	1631	New creation
Viscount Mayo (1627)	Tiobóid na Long Bourke, 1st Viscount Mayo	1627	1629	New creation; died
Viscount Mayo (1627)	Miles Bourke, 2nd Viscount Mayo	1629	1649	
Viscount Sarsfield (1627)	Dominick Sarsfield, 1st Viscount Sarsfield	1627	1636	New creation
Viscount Boyle of Kinalmeaky (1628)	Lewis Boyle, 1st Viscount Boyle of Kinalmeaky	1628	1642	New creation
Viscount Chaworth (1628)	George Chaworth, 1st Viscount Chaworth	1628	1639	New creation
Viscount Savile (1628)	Thomas Savile, 1st Viscount Savile	1628	1659	New creation
Viscount Cholmondeley (1628)	Robert Cholmondeley, 1st Viscount Cholmondeley	1628	1659	New creation
Viscount Lumley (1628)	Richard Lumley, 1st Viscount Lumley	1628	1663	New creation
Viscount Taaffe (1628)	John Taaffe, 1st Viscount Taaffe	1628	1642	New creation
Viscount Molyneux (1628)	Richard Molyneux, 1st Viscount Molyneux	1628	1636	New creation
Viscount Monson (1628)	William Monson, 1st Viscount Monson	1628	1660	New creation
Viscount Muskerry (1628)	Charles MacCarthy, 1st Viscount Muskerry	1628	1640	New creation
Viscount Strangford (1628)	Thomas Smythe, 1st Viscount Strangford	1628	1635	New creation
Viscount Scudamore (1628)	John Scudamore, 1st Viscount Scudamore	1628	1671	New creation
Viscount Wenman (1628)	Richard Wenman, 1st Viscount Wenman	1628	1640	New creation
Viscount Ranelagh (1628)	Roger Jones, 1st Viscount Ranelagh	1628	1643	New creation
Viscount Bourke of Clanmories (1629)	John Bourke, 1st Viscount Bourke	1629	1635	New creation
Viscount FitzWilliam (1629)	Thomas FitzWilliam, 1st Viscount FitzWilliam	1629	1650	New creation
Viscount Fairfax of Emley (1629)	Thomas Fairfax, 1st Viscount Fairfax of Emley	1629	1636	New creation
Viscount Ikerrin (1629)	Pierce Butler, 1st Viscount Ikerrin	1629	1674	New creation
Baron Athenry (1172)	Richard III de Bermingham	1612	1645	
Baron Kingsale (1223)	John de Courcy, 18th Baron Kingsale	1599	1628	Died
Baron Kingsale (1223)	Gerald de Courcy, 19th Baron Kingsale	1628	1642	
Baron Kerry (1223)	Thomas Fitzmaurice, 18th Baron Kerry	1600	1630	
Baron Slane (1370)	Christopher Fleming, 12th Baron Slane	1612	1625	Died
Baron Slane (1370)	Thomas Fleming, 13th Baron Slane	1625	1629	Resigned
Baron Slane (1370)	William Fleming, 14th Baron Slane	1629	1641	
Baron Howth (1425)	Nicholas St Lawrence, 11th Baron Howth	1619	1643	
Baron Killeen (1449)	Luke Plunkett, 10th Baron Killeen	1613	1637	Created Earl of Fingall, see above
Baron Trimlestown (1461)	Robert Barnewall, 7th Baron Trimlestown	1598	1639	
Baron Dunsany (1462)	Patrick Plunkett, 9th Baron of Dunsany	1603	1668	
Baron Delvin (1486)	Richard Nugent, 7th Baron Delvin	1602	1642	Created Earl of Westmeath, see above
Baron Power (1535)	John Power, 5th Baron Power	1607	1661	
Baron Dunboyne (1541)	James Butler, 2nd/12th Baron Dunboyne	1566	1624	Died
Baron Dunboyne (1541)	Edmond Butler, 3rd/13th Baron Dunboyne	1624	1640	
Baron Louth (1541)	Matthew Plunkett, 5th Baron Louth	1607	1629	Died
Baron Louth (1541)	Oliver Plunkett, 6th Baron Louth	1629	1679	
Baron Upper Ossory (1541)	Teige Fitzpatrick, 4th Baron Upper Ossory	1613	1627	Died
Baron Upper Ossory (1541)	Barnaby Fitzpatrick, 5th Baron Upper Ossory	1627	1638	
Baron Inchiquin (1543)	Dermod O'Brien, 5th Baron Inchiquin	1597	1624	Died
Baron Inchiquin (1543)	Murrough O'Brien, 6th Baron Inchiquin	1624	1674	
Baron Bourke of Castleconnell (1580)	Edmund Bourke, 5th Baron Bourke of Connell	1599	1635	
Baron Cahir (1583)	Thomas Butler, 2nd Baron Cahir	1596	1627	
Baron Cahir (1583)	Thomas Butler, 3rd Baron Cahir	1627	1648	
Baron Chichester (1613)	Arthur Chichester, 1st Baron Chichester	1613	1625	Died, title extinct
Baron Ardee (1616)	Edward Brabazon, 1st Baron Ardee	1616	1625	Died
Baron Ardee (1616)	William Brabazon, 2nd Baron Ardee	1625	1651	Created Earl of Meath, see above
Baron Boyle (1616)	Richard Boyle, 1st Baron Boyle	1616	1643	Created Earl of Cork, see above
Baron Moore (1616)	Garret Moore, 1st Baron Moore	1616	1627	Created Viscount Moore, see above
Baron Ridgeway (1616)	Thomas Ridgeway, 1st Baron Ridgeway	1616	1631	Created Earl of Londonderry, see above
Baron Hamilton (1617)	James Hamilton, 2nd Baron Hamilton	1617	1633	
Baron Bourke of Brittas (1618)	Theobald Bourke, 1st Baron Bourke of Brittas	1618	1654	
Baron Lambart (1618)	Charles Lambart, 2nd Baron Lambart	1618	1660	
Baron Mountjoy (1618)	Mountjoy Blount, 1st Baron Mountjoy	1618	1665	
Baron Balfour (1619)	James Balfour, 1st Baron Balfour of Glenawley	1619	1634	
Baron Castle Stewart (1619)	Andrew Stuart, 1st Baron Castle Stuart	1619	1629	Died
Baron Castle Stewart (1619)	Andrew Stewart, 2nd Baron Castle Stewart	1629	1639	
Baron Dillon (1619)	James Dillon, 1st Baron Dillon	1619	1642	Created Earl of Roscommon, see above
Baron Folliot (1620)	Henry Folliott, 1st Baron Folliott	1620	1622	New creation; died
Baron Folliot (1620)	Thomas Folliott, 2nd Baron Folliott	1622	1697	
Baron Maynard (1620)	William Maynard, 1st Baron Maynard	1620	1640	New creation
Baron Gorges of Dundalk (1620)	Edward Gorges, 1st Baron Gorges of Dundalk	1620	1650	New creation
Baron Offaly (1620)	Lettice Digby, 1st Baroness Offaly	1620	1658	New creation
Baron Digby (1620)	Robert Digby, 1st Baron Digby	1620	1642	New creation
Baron Hervey (1620)	William Hervey, 1st Baron Hervey	1620	1642	New creation
Baron Fitzwilliam (1620)	William Fitzwilliam, 1st Baron Fitzwilliam	1620	1644	New creation
Baron Caulfeild (1620)	Toby Caulfeild, 1st Baron Caulfeild	1620	1627	New creation; died
Baron Caulfeild (1620)	William Caulfeild, 2nd Baron Caulfeild	1627	1640	
Baron Aungier (1621)	Francis Aungier, 1st Baron Aungier of Longford	1621	1632	New creation
Baron Blayney (1621)	Edward Blayney, 1st Baron Blayney	1621	1629	New creation; died
Baron Blayney (1621)	Henry Blayney, 2nd Baron Blayney	1629	1646	
Baron Dockwra (1621)	Henry Dockwra, 1st Baron Dockwra	1621	1631	New creation
Baron Esmonde (1622)	Laurence Esmonde, 1st Baron Esmonde	1622	1646	New creation
Baron Glean-O'Mallun (1622)	Dermot O'Mallun, 1st Baron Glean-O'Mallun	1622	1639	New creation
Baron Brereton (1624)	William Brereton, 1st Baron Brereton	1624	1631	New creation
Baron Herbert of Castle Island (1624)	Edward Herbert, 1st Baron Herbert of Castle Island	1624	1648	New creation
Baron Baltimore (1625)	George Calvert, 1st Baron Baltimore	1625	1632	New creation
Baron Coleraine (1625)	Hugh Hare, 1st Baron Coleraine	1625	1667	New creation
Baron Sherard (1627)	William Sherard, 1st Baron Sherard	1627	1640	New creation
Baron Boyle of Broghill (1628)	Roger Boyle, 1st Baron Boyle of Broghill	1628	1679	New creation
Baron Maguire (1628)	Bryan Maguire, 1st Baron Maguire	1628	1633	New creation
Baron Mountnorris (1629)	Francis Annesley, 1st Baron Mountnorris	1629	1660	New creation

Preceded by List of peers 1610–1619	Lists of peers by decade 1620–1629	Succeeded by List of peers 1630–1639
