= List of peers 1590–1599 =

This page lists all peers who held extant titles between 1590 and 1599.

== Peerage of England ==
Title	Holder	Date gained	Date lost	Notes
Duke of Cornwall (1337)	none	1537	1603	
Marquess of Winchester (1551)	William Paulet, 3rd Marquess of Winchester	1576	1598	Died
Marquess of Winchester (1551)	William Paulet, 4th Marquess of Winchester	1598	1628	
Earl of Oxford (1142)	Edward de Vere, 17th Earl of Oxford	1562	1604	
Earl of Shrewsbury (1442)	George Talbot, 6th Earl of Shrewsbury	1560	1590	Died
Earl of Shrewsbury (1442)	Gilbert Talbot, 7th Earl of Shrewsbury	1590	1616	
Earl of Kent (1465)	Henry Grey, 6th Earl of Kent	1573	1615	
Earl of Derby (1485)	Henry Stanley, 4th Earl of Derby	1572	1593	Died
Earl of Derby (1485)	Ferdinando Stanley, 5th Earl of Derby	1593	1594	Died
Earl of Derby (1485)	William Stanley, 6th Earl of Derby	1594	1642	
Earl of Worcester (1514)	Edward Somerset, 4th Earl of Worcester	1589	1628	
Earl of Cumberland (1525)	George Clifford, 3rd Earl of Cumberland	1570	1605	
Earl of Rutland (1525)	Roger Manners, 5th Earl of Rutland	1588	1612	
Earl of Huntingdon (1529)	Henry Hastings, 3rd Earl of Huntingdon	1561	1595	Died
Earl of Huntingdon (1529)	George Hastings, 4th Earl of Huntingdon	1595	1604	
Earl of Sussex (1529)	Henry Radclyffe, 4th Earl of Sussex	1583	1593	Died
Earl of Sussex (1529)	Robert Radclyffe, 5th Earl of Sussex	1593	1629	
Earl of Bath (1536)	William Bourchier, 3rd Earl of Bath	1561	1623	
Earl of Southampton (1547)	Henry Wriothesley, 3rd Earl of Southampton	1581	1624	
Earl of Bedford (1550)	Edward Russell, 3rd Earl of Bedford	1585	1627	
Earl of Pembroke (1551)	Henry Herbert, 2nd Earl of Pembroke	1570	1601	
Earl of Devon (1553)	William Courtenay, de jure 3rd Earl of Devon	1557	1630	
Earl of Northumberland (1557)	Henry Percy, 9th Earl of Northumberland	1585	1632	
Earl of Hertford (1559)	Edward Seymour, 1st Earl of Hertford	1559	1621	
Earl of Warwick (1561)	Ambrose Dudley, 1st Earl of Warwick	1561	1590	Died, title extinct
Earl of Essex (1572)	Robert Devereux, 2nd Earl of Essex	1576	1601	
Earl of Lincoln (1572)	Henry Clinton, 2nd Earl of Lincoln	1585	1616	
Earl of Nottingham (1596)	Charles Howard, 1st Earl of Nottingham	1596	1624	New creation
Viscount Montagu (1554)	Anthony Browne, 1st Viscount Montagu	1554	1592	Died
Viscount Montagu (1554)	Anthony-Maria Browne, 2nd Viscount Montagu	1592	1629	
Viscount Howard of Bindon (1559)	Henry Howard, 2nd Viscount Howard of Bindon	1582	1590	Died
Viscount Howard of Bindon (1559)	Thomas Howard, 3rd Viscount Howard of Bindon	1590	1611	
Baron de Ros (1264)	Elizabeth Cecil, 16th Baroness de Ros	1587	1591	Died
Baron de Ros (1264)	William Cecil, 17th Baron de Ros	1591	1618	
Baron Grey de Wilton (1295)	Arthur Grey, 14th Baron Grey de Wilton	1562	1593	Died
Baron Grey de Wilton (1295)	Thomas Grey, 15th Baron Grey de Wilton	1593	1604	
Baron Morley (1299)	Edward Parker, 12th Baron Morley	1577	1618	
Baron Zouche of Haryngworth (1308)	Edward la Zouche, 11th Baron Zouche	1569	1625	
Baron Audley of Heleigh (1313)	George Tuchet, 11th Baron Audley	1563	1617	
Baron Cobham of Kent (1313)	William Brooke, 10th Baron Cobham	1558	1597	Died
Baron Cobham of Kent (1313)	Henry Brooke, 11th Baron Cobham	1597	1603	
Baron Willoughby de Eresby (1313)	Peregrine Bertie, 13th Baron Willoughby de Eresby	1580	1601	
Baron Dacre (1321)	Gregory Fiennes, 10th Baron Dacre	1558	1594	Died
Baron Dacre (1321)	Margaret Fiennes, 11th Baroness Dacre	1594	1612	
Baron Scrope of Bolton (1371)	Henry Scrope, 9th Baron Scrope of Bolton	1549	1591	Died
Baron Scrope of Bolton (1371)	Thomas Scrope, 10th Baron Scrope of Bolton	1591	1609	
Baron Bergavenny (1392)	Mary Fane, 7th Baroness Bergavenny	1585	1626	
Baron Berkeley (1421)	Henry Berkeley, 7th Baron Berkeley	1534	1613	
Baron Dudley (1440)	Edward Sutton, 5th Baron Dudley	1586	1643	
Baron Saye and Sele (1447)	Richard Fiennes, 7th Baron Saye and Sele	1573	1613	
Baron Stourton (1448)	Edward Stourton, 10th Baron Stourton	1588	1633	
Baron Ogle (1461)	Cuthbert Ogle, 7th Baron Ogle	1562	1597	Died, Barony fell into abeyance, until 1625
Baron Mountjoy (1465)	William Blount, 7th Baron Mountjoy	1582	1594	Died
Baron Mountjoy (1465)	Charles Blount, 8th Baron Mountjoy	1594	1606	
Baron Willoughby de Broke (1491)	Fulke Greville, 4th Baron Willoughby de Broke	1562	1606	
Baron Monteagle (1514)	William Parker, 4th Baron Monteagle	1581	1622	
Baron Vaux of Harrowden (1523)	William Vaux, 3rd Baron Vaux of Harrowden	1556	1595	Died
Baron Vaux of Harrowden (1523)	Edward Vaux, 4th Baron Vaux of Harrowden	1595	1661	
Baron Sandys of the Vine (1529)	William Sandys, 3rd Baron Sandys	1560	1623	
Baron Burgh (1529)	Thomas Burgh, 3rd Baron Burgh	1584	1597	Died
Baron Burgh (1529)	Robert Burgh, 4th Baron Burgh	1597	1602	
Baron Windsor (1529)	Henry Windsor, 5th Baron Windsor	1585	1605	
Baron Wentworth (1529)	Henry Wentworth, 3rd Baron Wentworth	1584	1593	Died
Baron Wentworth (1529)	Thomas Wentworth, 4th Baron Wentworth	1593	1667	
Baron Mordaunt (1532)	Lewis Mordaunt, 3rd Baron Mordaunt	1571	1601	
Baron Cromwell (1540)	Henry Cromwell, 2nd Baron Cromwell	1551	1593	Died
Baron Cromwell (1540)	Edward Cromwell, 3rd Baron Cromwell	1593	1607	
Baron Eure (1544)	William Eure, 2nd Baron Eure	1548	1594	Died
Baron Eure (1544)	Ralph Eure, 3rd Baron Eure	1594	1617	
Baron Wharton (1545)	Philip Wharton, 3rd Baron Wharton	1572	1625	
Baron Sheffield (1547)	Edmund Sheffield, 3rd Baron Sheffield	1568	1646	
Baron Rich (1547)	Robert Rich, 3rd Baron Rich	1581	1618	
Baron Willoughby of Parham (1547)	Charles Willoughby, 2nd Baron Willoughby of Parham	1570	1612	
Baron Lumley (1547)	John Lumley, 1st Baron Lumley	1547	1609	
Baron Darcy of Aston (1548)	John Darcy, 2nd Baron Darcy of Aston	1558	1602	
Baron Darcy of Chiche (1551)	Thomas Darcy, 3rd Baron Darcy of Chiche	1581	1640	
Baron North (1554)	Roger North, 2nd Baron North	1564	1600	
Baron Howard of Effingham (1554)	Charles Howard, 2nd Baron Howard of Effingham	1573	1624	Created Earl of Nottingham, see above
Baron Chandos (1554)	Giles Brydges, 3rd Baron Chandos	1573	1594	Died
Baron Chandos (1554)	William Brydges, 4th Baron Chandos	1594	1602	
Baron Hunsdon (1559)	Henry Carey, 1st Baron Hunsdon	1559	1596	Died
Baron Hunsdon (1559)	George Carey, 2nd Baron Hunsdon	1596	1603	
Baron St John of Bletso (1559)	John St John, 2nd Baron St John of Bletso	1582	1596	Died
Baron St John of Bletso (1559)	John St John, 2nd Baron St John of Bletso	1582	1596	
Baron Buckhurst (1567)	Thomas Sackville, 1st Baron Buckhurst	1567	1608	
Baron De La Warr (1570)	William West, 1st Baron De La Warr	1570	1595	Died
Baron De La Warr (1570)	Thomas West, 2nd Baron De La Warr	1595	1602	
Baron Burghley (1571)	William Cecil, 1st Baron Burghley	1571	1598	
Baron Burghley (1571)	Thomas Cecil, 2nd Baron Burghley	1598	1623	
Baron Compton (1572)	William Compton, 2nd Baron Compton	1589	1630	
Baron Norreys (1572)	Henry Norris, 1st Baron Norreys	1572	1601	
Baron Howard de Walden (1597)	Thomas Howard, 1st Baron Howard de Walden	1597	1626	New creation

== Peerage of Scotland ==
Title	Holder	Date gained	Date lost	Notes
Duke of Rothesay (1398)	Henry Frederick Stuart, Duke of Rothesay	1594	1612	
Duke of Lennox (1581)	Ludovic Stewart, 2nd Duke of Lennox	1583	1624	
Marquess of Huntly (1599)	George Gordon, 1st Marquess of Huntly	1599	1636	
Marquess of Hamilton (1599)	John Hamilton, 1st Marquess of Hamilton	1599	1604	
Earl of Mar (1114)	John Erskine, 19th/2nd Earl of Mar	1572	1634	
Earl of Sutherland (1235)	Alexander Gordon, 12th Earl of Sutherland	1567	1594	Died
Earl of Sutherland (1235)	John Gordon, 13th Earl of Sutherland	1594	1615	
Earl of Angus (1389)	William Douglas, 9th Earl of Angus	1588	1591	Died
Earl of Angus (1389)	William Douglas, 10th Earl of Angus	1591	1611	
Earl of Crawford (1398)	David Lindsay, 11th Earl of Crawford	1574	1607	
Earl of Menteith (1427)	John Graham, 6th Earl of Menteith	1578	1598	Died
Earl of Menteith (1427)	William Graham, 7th Earl of Menteith	1598	1661	
Earl of Huntly (1445)	George Gordon, 6th Earl of Huntly	1579	1636	Created Marquess of Huntley, see above
Earl of Erroll (1452)	Francis Hay, 9th Earl of Erroll	1585	1631	
Earl of Caithness (1455)	George Sinclair, 5th Earl of Caithness	1582	1643	
Earl of Argyll (1457)	Archibald Campbell, 7th Earl of Argyll	1584	1638	
Earl of Atholl (1457)	John Stewart, 5th Earl of Atholl	1579	1595	Died, title extinct
Earl of Morton (1458)	William Douglas, 6th Earl of Morton	1588	1606	
Earl of Rothes (1458)	Andrew Leslie, 5th Earl of Rothes	1558	1611	
Earl Marischal (1458)	George Keith, 5th Earl Marischal	1581	1623	
Earl of Buchan (1469)	James Douglas, 5th Earl of Buchan	1580	1601	
Earl of Glencairn (1488)	James Cunningham, 7th Earl of Glencairn	1578	1630	
Earl of Arran (1503)	James Hamilton, 3rd Earl of Arran	1575	1609	
Earl of Montrose (1503)	John Graham, 3rd Earl of Montrose	1571	1608	
Earl of Eglinton (1507)	Hugh Montgomerie, 5th Earl of Eglinton	1586	1612	
Earl of Cassilis (1509)	John Kennedy, 5th Earl of Cassilis	1576	1615	
Earl of Moray (1562)	Elizabeth Stuart, 2nd Countess of Moray	1570	1591	Died
Earl of Moray (1562)	James Stuart, 3rd Earl of Moray	1591	1638	
Earl of Bothwell (1581)	Francis Stewart, 1st Earl of Bothwell	1581	1592	Attainted
Earl of Gowrie (1581)	John Ruthven, 3rd Earl of Gowrie	1588	1600	
Earl of Orkney (1581)	Robert Stewart, 1st Earl of Orkney	1581	1593	Died
Earl of Orkney (1581)	Patrick Stewart, 2nd Earl of Orkney	1593	1614	
Earl of Atholl (1596)	John Stewart, 1st Earl of Atholl	1596	1603	New creation
Lord Somerville (1430)	Hugh Somerville, 7th Lord Somerville	1569	1597	Died
Lord Somerville (1430)	Gilbert Somerville, 8th Lord Somerville	1597	1618	
Lord Forbes (1442)	William Forbes, 7th Lord Forbes	1547	1593	Died
Lord Forbes (1442)	John Forbes, 8th Lord Forbes	1593	1606	
Lord Maxwell (1445)	John Maxwell, 8th Lord Maxwell	1555	1593	Died
Lord Maxwell (1445)	John Maxwell, 9th Lord Maxwell	1593	1613	
Lord Glamis (1445)	Patrick Lyon, 9th Lord Glamis	1578	1615	
Lord Lindsay of the Byres (1445)	James Lindsay, 7th Lord Lindsay	1589	1601	
Lord Saltoun (1445)	George Abernethy, 7th Lord Saltoun	1587	1590	
Lord Saltoun (1445)	John Abernethy, 8th Lord Saltoun	1590	1612	
Lord Gray (1445)	Patrick Gray, 5th Lord Gray	1584	1608	
Lord Sinclair (1449)	Henry Sinclair, 5th Lord Sinclair	1570	1601	
Lord Fleming (1451)	John Fleming, 6th Lord Fleming	1572	1619	
Lord Seton (1451)	Robert Seton, 8th Lord Seton	1586	1603	
Lord Borthwick (1452)	James Borthwick, 7th Lord Borthwick	1582	1599	Died
Lord Borthwick (1452)	John Borthwick, 8th Lord Borthwick	1599	1623	
Lord Boyd (1454)	Robert Boyd, 5th Lord Boyd	1558	1590	Died
Lord Boyd (1454)	Thomas Boyd, 6th Lord Boyd	1590	1611	
Lord Oliphant (1455)	Laurence Oliphant, 4th Lord Oliphant	1566	1593	Died
Lord Oliphant (1455)	Laurence Oliphant, 5th Lord Oliphant	1593	1631	
Lord Livingston (1458)	William Livingstone, 6th Lord Livingston	1553	1592	Died
Lord Livingston (1458)	Alexander Livingston, 7th Lord Livingston	1592	1623	
Lord Cathcart (1460)	Alan Cathcart, 4th Lord Cathcart	1547	1618	
Lord Lovat (1464)	Simon Fraser, 6th Lord Lovat	1577	1633	
Lord Innermeath (1470)	John Stewart, 6th Lord Innermeath	1585	1603	Created Earl of Atholl, see above
Lord Carlyle of Torthorwald (1473)	Elizabeth Douglas, 5th Lady Carlyle	1575	1605	
Lord Home (1473)	Alexander Home, 6th Lord Home	1575	1619	
Lord Crichton of Sanquhar (1488)	Robert Crichton, 8th Lord Crichton of Sanquhar	1569	1612	
Lord Drummond of Cargill (1488)	Patrick Drummond, 3rd Lord Drummond	1571	1600	
Lord Hay of Yester (1488)	William Hay, 6th Lord Hay of Yester	1586	1591	Died
Lord Hay of Yester (1488)	James Hay, 7th Lord Hay of Yester	1591	1609	
Lord Sempill (1489)	Robert Sempill, 4th Lord Sempill	1576	1611	
Lord Herries of Terregles (1490)	Agnes Maxwell, 4th Lady Herries of Terregles	1543	1594	Died
Lord Herries of Terregles (1490)	William Maxwell, 5th Lord Herries of Terregles	1594	1604	
Lord Ogilvy of Airlie (1491)	James Ogilvy, 5th Lord Ogilvy of Airlie	1549	1606	
Lord Ross (1499)	Robert Ross, 5th Lord Ross	1581	1595	Died
Lord Ross (1499)	James Ross, 6th Lord Ross	1595	1633	
Lord Elphinstone (1509)	Robert Elphinstone, 3rd Lord Elphinstone	1547	1602	
Lord Ochiltree (1543)	Andrew Stewart, 2nd Lord Ochiltree	1548	1591	Died
Lord Ochiltree (1543)	Andrew Stuart, 3rd Lord Ochiltree	1591	1615	
Lord Torphichen (1564)	James Sandilands, 2nd Lord Torphichen	1579	1617	
Lord Doune (1581)	James Stewart, 1st Lord Doune	1581	1590	Title succeeded by the Earl of Moray, see above
Lord Dingwall (1584)	Andrew Keith, 1st Lord Dingwall	1584	abt. 1599	Died, title extinct
Lord Paisley (1587)	Claud Hamilton, 1st Lord Paisley	1587	1621	
Lord Maitland (1590)	John Maitland, 1st Lord Maitland of Thirlestane	1590	1595	New creation, died
Lord Maitland (1590)	John Maitland, 2nd Lord Maitland of Thirlestane	1595	1645	
Lord Spynie (1590)	Alexander Lindsay, 1st Lord Spynie	1590	1607	New creation
Lord Newbottle (1591)	Mark Kerr, 1st Lord Newbottle	1591	1609	New creation
Lord Fyvie (1598)	Alexander Seton, 1st Lord Fyvie	1598	1622	New creation

== Peerage of Ireland ==
Title	Holder	Date gained	Date lost	Notes
Earl of Kildare (1316)	Henry FitzGerald, 12th Earl of Kildare	1585	1597	Died
Earl of Kildare (1316)	William FitzGerald, 13th Earl of Kildare	1597	1599	
Earl of Kildare (1316)	Gerald FitzGerald, 14th Earl of Kildare	1599	1612	
Earl of Ormond (1328)	Thomas Butler, 10th Earl of Ormond	1546	1614	
Earl of Waterford (1446)	George Talbot, 6th Earl of Waterford	1560	1590	Died
Earl of Waterford (1446)	Gilbert Talbot, 7th Earl of Waterford	1590	1616	
Earl of Tyrone (1542)	Hugh O'Neill, 3rd Earl of Tyrone	1562	1608	
Earl of Clanricarde (1543)	Ulick Burke, 3rd Earl of Clanricarde	1582	1601	
Earl of Thomond (1543)	Donogh O'Brien, 4th Earl of Thomond	1581	1624	
Earl of Clancare (1565)	Donald McCarthy, 1st Earl of Clancare	1565	1597	Resigned
Viscount Gormanston (1478)	Christopher Preston, 4th Viscount Gormanston	1569	1599	Died
Viscount Gormanston (1478)	Jenico Preston, 5th Viscount Gormanston	1599	1630	
Viscount Buttevant (1541)	David de Barry, 5th Viscount Buttevant	1581	1617	
Viscount Mountgarret (1550)	Edmund Butler, 2nd Viscount Mountgarret	1571	1602	
Baron Athenry (1172)	Edmond I de Bermingham	1580	1612	
Baron Kingsale (1223)	Gerald de Courcy, 17th Baron Kingsale	1535	1599	Died
Baron Kingsale (1223)	John de Courcy, 18th Baron Kingsale	1599	1628	
Baron Kerry (1223)	Thomas Fitzmaurice, 16th Baron Kerry	1550	1590	Died
Baron Kerry (1223)	Patrick Fitzmaurice, 17th Baron Kerry	1590	1600	
Baron Slane (1370)	Thomas Fleming, 10th Baron Slane	1578	1597	Died
Baron Slane (1370)	William Fleming, 11th Baron Slane	1597	1612	
Baron Howth (1425)	Nicholas St Lawrence, 9th Baron Howth	1589	1606	
Baron Killeen (1449)	James Plunkett, 8th Baron Killeen	1567	1595	Died
Baron Killeen (1449)	Christopher Plunkett, 9th Baron Killeen	1595	1613	
Baron Trimlestown (1461)	Peter Barnewall, 6th Baron Trimlestown	1573	1598	Died
Baron Trimlestown (1461)	Robert Barnewall, 7th Baron Trimlestown	1598	1639	
Baron Dunsany (1462)	Patrick Plunkett, 7th Baron of Dunsany	1564	1601	
Baron Delvin (1486)	Christopher Nugent, 6th Baron Delvin	1559	1602	
Baron Power (1535)	John Power, 3rd Baron Power	1545	1592	Died
Baron Power (1535)	Richard Power, 4th Baron Power	1592	1607	
Baron Dunboyne (1541)	James Butler, 2nd/12th Baron Dunboyne	1566	1624	
Baron Louth (1541)	Oliver Plunkett, 4th Baron Louth	1575	1607	
Baron Upper Ossory (1541)	Florence Fitzpatrick, 3rd Baron Upper Ossory	1581	1613	
Baron Inchiquin (1543)	Murrough O'Brien, 4th Baron Inchiquin	1573	1597	Died
Baron Inchiquin (1543)	Dermod O'Brien, 5th Baron Inchiquin	1597	1624	
Baron Ardenerie (1580)	William Bourke, 2nd Baron Ardenerie	1580	1591	Died; title extinct
Baron Bourke of Castleconnell (1580)	John Bourke, 2nd Baron Bourke of Connell	1584	1592	Died
Baron Bourke of Castleconnell (1580)	Richard Bourke, 3rd Baron Bourke of Connell	1592	1599	Died
Baron Bourke of Castleconnell (1580)	Thomas Bourke, 4th Baron Bourke of Connell	1599	1599	Died
Baron Bourke of Castleconnell (1580)	Edmund Bourke, 5th Baron Bourke of Connell	1599	1635	
Baron Cahir (1583)	Theobald Butler, 1st Baron Cahir	1583	1596	Died
Baron Cahir (1583)	Thomas Butler, 2nd Baron Cahir	1596	1627	
