= John Bothwell, Lord Holyroodhouse =

Scottish judge

John Bothwell of Auldhamer, Lord Holyroodhouse (c.1550–1609) was a 16th-century Scottish judge and Senator of the College of Justice.

== Life ==
He was the son of Adam Bothwell, a Lord of Session and bishop of Orkney. His mother was Margaret Murray, daughter of John Murray of Touchadam. His uncle Richard Bothwell served as Provost of Edinburgh during the reign of Mary Queen of Scots. His grandfather Francis Bothwell had also been a Senator of the College of Justice since its foundation in 1532 and a Lord of Session in the Edinburgh courts. Francis was Provost of Edinburgh 1523/24. His aunt, Janet Bothwell, was mother of the mathematician, John Napier.

In early life he was styled "John Bothwell of Alhammer".

Being a favourite of King James VI he was made Abbot or Commendator of Holyrood Abbey from 1581.

In July 1593 he was created a Senator of the College of Justice and Lord of Session, in place of his father, and adopted the title of "Lord Holyroodhouse".

He dressed as an Amazon in "woman's array" August 1594 to perform in the tournament of running at the ring at the baptism of Prince Henry at Stirling Castle. In May 1595 James VI gave him a diamond ring worth £180 Scots. In September 1595 James VI sent him to be his representative at the christening of a child of Elizabeth Douglas, Countess of Erroll.

He was an ally of the Laird of Buccleuch.

His correspondence with Anthony Bacon in England in 1596 mentions his relation or distant kinsman, "Mr Kello", the husband of the calligrapher Esther Inglis. Bartilmo Kello was his clerk and messenger in the 1590s, described as his "servitor" in legal records.

At the Union of the Crowns, in 1603, King James sent him to fetch the keys of Berwick-upon-Tweed. With other Scottish courtiers he was admitted to Gray's Inn on 22 May 1603.

In December 1607 the king elevated the title from a non-hereditary legal title to a hereditary title.

He died on 26 November 1609. He is thought to be buried in Holyrood Abbey adjacent to his home. If so, he may share the grave of his parents at the second column from the main east window.

== Family ==
He was married to Maria or Marie Carmichael (died 1626), a daughter of Sir John Carmichael of Carmichael (d.1600).

She lived in Advocate's Close in Edinburgh, on the site of the present later house called "Adam Bothwell's house", built by William Dick of Braid. Her will mentions a larger "meikle" hall with a "wainscot" or oak dining table, a cupboard (shelves) made of "fir" or pine and an oak table.

Their son John Bothwell became the 2nd Lord Holyroodhouse. He seemed to have lived in Dundee rather than Edinburgh as he became a burgess of that town in 1620. The title Lord Holyroodhouse temporarily expired with his death in 1638 but was readopted in the early 18th century by his descendant Henry Bothwell, 3rd Lord Holyroodhouse (1657-1755).

Peerage of Scotland
New creation	Lord Holyroodhouse; 1607–1609	Succeeded by John Bothwell
