= George Lindsay, 3rd Lord Spynie =

George Lindsay, 3rd Lord Spynie (died 1671) was a Scottish nobleman.

== Life ==
George Lindsay, 3rd Lord Spynie, was the second son of Alexander Lindsay, 2nd Lord Spynie, by his second wife, Lady Margaret Hay. He succeeded to the estates on the death of his father in 1646.

A supporter of Charles I of Great Britain, Spynie opposed the surrender of the king to the English. As colonel of the Stirling and Clackmannan horse he took part in the 'engagement' for the rescue of the king from the English in 1648. On 20 December 1650 he was appointed one of the colonels of horse for Forfarshire.

Taken prisoner at the battle of Worcester in 1651, Spynie was on 16 September committed to the Tower of London. He was excepted from Cromwell's Act of Grace in 1654, and on 5 May, he forfeited his estates at the Edinburgh Market Cross.

Spynie was pardoned at the Restoration of 1660 and was reinstated in his possessions. On the death of Ludovic Lindsay, 16th Earl of Crawford, in 1666, he was served his heir, and became the chief representative of the Lindsay family. He died before December 1671. As he had no heir, his title of 'Lord Spynie' became extinct upon his death.

== Notes ==
Attribution

This article incorporates text from a publication now in the public domain: Lee, Sidney, ed. (1893). "Lindsay, George". Dictionary of National Biography. Vol. 33. London: Smith, Elder & Co.

Peerage of Scotland
Preceded by Alexander Lindsay	Lord Spynie; 1646–1671	Dormant
