= Dermot O'Mallun, 1st Baron Glean-O'Mallun =

Lawyer from Ireland

Dermot O'Mallun, 1st Baron Glean-O'Mallun (died 1 May 1639) was an Irish lawyer.

== Biography ==
A Roman Catholic, he was educated abroad and became learned in the law and in poetry. He served as a lawyer to the Archdukes Albert and Isabella of the Spanish Netherlands, and in 1616 he was made a knight of the Order of Calatrava. He also served as an equerry to the Infanta Isabella, as a gentleman of the chamber to the Emperor Ferdinand II, and as mestre de camp of a regiment of cavalry in the Emperor's service. On 5 October 1622 he was raised to the peerage of Ireland by King James I as Baron Glean-O'Mallun and Courchy of county Clare, with remainder to Albert O'Mallun and his heirs male.

O'Mallun was married to Marie Hannedouche, dame de Haguerve, daughter of Sebastien Hannedouche, seigneur de Hunctun, de Faye et de Bondues, and his wife Michelle de Hauteclocque. They had a daughter Anne Marie, who married Jacques Quarré, seigneur de La Haye, and had issue. O'Mallun died on 1 May 1639 and was buried in the Church of St Gudule at Brussels. His widow died on 1 February 1641.

Nothing further is known of the barony, which probably became extinct in about May 1641. However, one Dermot Malone sat under this title in the Patriot Parliament of 1689.
