= Edmond I de Bermingham =

Edmond I de Bermingham (died 1612) was an Anglo-Irish lord.

Edmond was the first Lord Athenry to permanently reside at Dunmore, County Galway. His father had been forced to vacate Athenry, which had been the family's seat since about 1537, due to incessant warfare and famine during the middle years of the sixteenth century. Yet even these lands were subject to raids, notably by Teige Ó Flaithbheartaigh in 1589.

While he remained among the first class of the local gentry, his net worth and political influence were greatly diminished, and he was forced to mortgage and sell lands to merchants of The Tribes of Galway, many of whom became as prosperous and influential as his ancestors.

The final destruction of the original seat of the lordship, Athenry, in 1597 by Red Hugh O'Donnell, marked the final destruction of his hopes of financial recovery.

Peerage of Ireland
Preceded by Richard II de Bermingham	Baron Athenry; 1580–1612	Succeeded by Richard III de Bermingham
