= Alexander Lindsay, 2nd Lord Spynie =

Scottish nobleman and soldier of fortune (died 1646)

Alexander Lindsay, 2nd Lord Spynie (died March 1646) was a Scottish nobleman and soldier of fortune.

== Life ==
He was the eldest son of Alexander Lindsay, 1st Lord Spynie from his wife Jean Lyon. He was still a minor at the time of his father's murder in 1607. In year 1609, the trial of his father's murderer was not proceeded with on account of the absence of a prosecutor. A protest was made on his behalf and of the other children, how their ultimate right of prosecution should not be invalidated. However, after Spynie came of age, he agreed to waive his right of prosecution, when Lindsay of Edzell, the murderer, affirmed on oath that the slaughter was accidental. He paid a sum of eight thousand merks and transferred the lands of Garlobank, Perthshire to him and his sister. On 7 March 1617, Edzell obtained a remission for the slaughter under the great seal.

Spynie was one of the Scottish lords who attended the funeral of James VI and I in Westminster Abbey in 1625. On 2 June 1626, he became commander-in-chief in Scotland for life. Having raised a regiment of three thousand foot for King Christian IV of Denmark-Norway, he served with distinction in both Denmark and Germany. Christian made him Governor General of the eastern Danish provinces of Skåne, Halland and Blekinge. In 1628 his regiment fought at the siege of Stralsund alongside the regiment of Donald Mackay, Lord Reay. The Scots and their allies in the garrison were eventually relieved by Sir Alexander Leslie who was made governor of the city. Lord Spynie and his regiment were thereafter recalled to Skåne while Mackay's was recalled to Copenhagen leaving Leslie and his troops in command of the city.

After his return to Scotland, his appointment as commander-in-chief was confirmed on 28 June 1633.

In the dispute with the Covenanters, Spynie supported the king Charles I of Great Britain. He joined Montrose at Perth after the battle of Tippermuir in September 1644. On 14th, he was with him as he entered Aberdeen. However, two days afterwards, Montrose vacated the city for he was taken as a prisoner and sent south to Edinburgh.

Spynie died in March 1646.

== Family ==
Spynie was first married to Joanna Douglas, and on the second time to Lady Margaret Hay, only daughter of George Hay, 1st Earl of Kinnoull. On his first wife, Spynie had no issue. On his second, he had two sons, Alexander, master of Kinnoul, and George, who succeeded him as third lord—and two daughters. Margaret, married to William Fullarton of Fullarton, and Anne, who died unmarried.

== Notes ==
Attribution

This article incorporates text from a publication now in the public domain: Lee, Sidney, ed. (1893). "Lindsay, Alexander (d.1646)". Dictionary of National Biography. Vol. 33. London: Smith, Elder & Co.

Peerage of Scotland
Preceded by Alexander Lindsay	Lord Spynie; 1607–1646	Succeeded by George Lindsay
