= Lord Holyroodhouse =

Title in the Peerage of Scotland

The title of Lord Holyroodhouse is a dormant title in the Peerage of Scotland.

At the time of the Reformation in Scotland (1559) Holyrood Abbey passed out of church hands and the nominal "abbacy" and lands were purchased by Adam Bothwell. In 1583 he passed the lands to his son, John Bothwell. John converted the abbey buildings to a house and named it Holyrood House.

The title was created in July 1593 as a non-hereditary title for John Bothwell as his title as a Senator of the College of Justice. On 20 December 1607 King James VI elevated the title to that of a hereditary lord. On the death of the second lord in 1638, the lordship became dormant. Some records state the title died in 1609 as the first Lord Holyroodhouse died childless.

In 1704, Alexander Bothwell of Glencorse served himself heir to the title, but his claim was rejected due to a faulty pedigree. On 8 February 1734, Alexander's eldest son, Henry, submitted a petition to the king claiming the title under a different pedigree. His claim was accepted by the king and "laid before the House of Lords" on 29 March 1734, but no action was ever taken by the Lords.

Despite the failure of the Lords to approve his claim, Henry assumed and used the title throughout his life. However, upon his death, none of his surviving sons pursued the title and none of them had male heirs. However, since there were other male relatives alive at the time, the title was deemed dormant rather than extinct.

The estate of Holyroodhouse was unlikely to ever be recognised as in 1671 it had been redeveloped by the crown to create Holyrood Palace. The 18th century claims were therefore only motivated to acquire notional compensation for the crown use of the land.

== Lords Holyroodhouse (1607) ==
- John Bothwell, Lord Holyroodhouse (d. 1609)
- John Bothwell, 2nd Lord Holyroodhouse (d. 1638)
