= Lord of Pittenweem =

Scottish noble title

Lordship of Pittenweem
- '
- Creation date: 1609
- Creation: Baronage of Scotland
- Created by: James VII
- First holder: Frederick Stewart, 1st Baron of Pittenweem
- Remainder to: heirs and assignees
- Subsidiary titles: Baron of Pittenweem; Lord of Pittenweem
- Status: extant
- Motto: Aliter Cogita

Lord of Pittenweem or Baron of Pittenweem is a title of nobility in the Baronage of Scotland (a lordship of higher baronial nobility than barony).

Note that for Lords in the Baronage of Scotland a baron is a lord and a lord is a baron and is interchangeable, the chapeau represents Scottish barons in historic heraldry instead of a coronet.

It was created by James VI as a barony in 1609 for Frederick Stewart, son of William Stewart, Commendator of Pittenweem. Fredrick Stewart assigned the title and lands of the Lordship and Barony to Thomas Erskine, Viscount Fenton, later 1st Earl of Kellie, in 1614. Between 1631 and 1672 the Lordship and Barony was held by the Crown. It was held "in place of the late lords" so that when the Barony and Lordship later passed to the 3rd Earl of Kellie it was not as a new creation but by an assignation of the Lordship and Barony.

The title was used as a courtesy title for the eldest son of the Earls of Kellie until it was conveyed to Sir John Anstruther by Thomas Alexander Erskine, 6th Earl of Kellie and 6th Lord of Pittenweem. Sir Windham Carmichael-Anstruther, 7th Baronet, 12th Baron of Pittenweem, succeeded in breaking the entail of his Anstruther estates, and sold them, together with the Lordship and Barony of Pittenweem to William Baird of Elie, who became the 13th Lord of Pittenweem in 1856.

The Lordship passed to Lady Lavinia Enid Muriel Baird in 1961 and was conveyed to the lawyer and Writer to The Signet William Ronald Crawford Miller in 1978. After the Abolition of Feudal Tenure etc. (Scotland) Act 2000, the Lordship and Barony of Pittenweem became an incorporeal heritable property, no longer attached to the land.

William Ronald Crawford Miller, 17th Baron of Pittenweem, died in 2011.

== Lord of Pittenweem (1609) ==
- 1605-1614: Frederick Stewart, 1st Baron of Pittenweem.
- 1614-1631: Thomas Erskine, 1st Earl of Kellie, 2nd Baron of Pittenweem
- 1672-1677: Alexander Erskine, 3rd Earl of Kellie, 3rd Baron of Pittenweem
- 1677-1710: Alexander Erskine, 4th Earl of Kellie, 4th Baron of Pittenweem
- 1710-1756: Alexander Erskine, 5th Earl of Kellie, 5th Baron of Pittenweem
- 1756-1766: Thomas Alexander Erskine, 6th Earl of Kellie, 6th Baron of Pittenweem
- 1766-1799: Sir John Anstruther, 2nd Baronet, 7th Baron of Pittenweem
- 1799-1808: Sir Philip Anstruther-Paterson, 3rd Baronet, 8th Baron of Pittenweem
- 1808-1811: Sir John Anstruther, 1st Baronet of Fort William, 4th of Anstruther of Anstruther and Elie House, 9th Baron of Pittenweem
- 1811-1818: Sir John Carmichael-Anstruther, 2nd and 5th Baronet, 10th Baron of Pittenweem
- 1818-1831: Sir John Carmichael-Anstruther, 3rd and 6th Baronet, 11th Baron of Pittenweem
- 1831-1853: Sir Windham Carmichael-Anstruther, 7th Baronet, 12th Baron of Pittenweem
- 1853-1864: William Baird of Elie, 13th Baron of Pittenweem
- 1864-1918: William Baird, 14th Baron of Pittenweem
- 1918-1961: William James Baird, 15th Baron of Pittenweem
- 1961-1978: Lavinia Enid Muriel Baird, 16th Baroness of Pittenweem
- 1978-2011: William Ronald Crawford Miller, WS, 17th Baron of Pittenweem
- 2011-: Claes Zangenberg, 18th Baron of Pittenweem

== Arms ==
Coat of arms of Lord of Pittenweem

Crest
The crest sits atop a helm appropriate to the Dignity of a Baron in the Baronage of Scotland.
Per pile reversed Or and Vert, in chief two Maunches Gules and in base a scroll Argent with seal pendant.
Escutcheon
The pliers are a pun on the German origin of the Zangenberg name. The Maunches and the scroll is a reference to the legal career of the armiger.
A dexter hand couped holding a pair of open pliers proper.
Motto
Latin: Aliter Cogita ("Think Differently")

Registered: The International Register of Arms, 13th Sept 2017. Registration No. 0431 (Vol.3). (Lordship & Barony Register)

Grant: The Court of the Lord Lyon, 27 June 2017 (Vol.93, folio 49).
