= Lord Spynie =

Lord Spynie is a title in the Peerage of Scotland. It was created on 4 November 1590 for Sir Alexander Lindsay, younger son of David Lindsay, 10th Earl of Crawford. The title became dormant on the death of the third Lord in 1671.

== Lords Spynie (1590) ==
- Alexander Lindsay, 1st Lord Spynie (d. 1607)
- Alexander Lindsay, 2nd Lord Spynie (d. 1646)
- George Lindsay, 3rd Lord Spynie (d. 1671)

== See also ==
- Earl of Crawford
- Earl of Balcarres
- Earl of Lindsay
- Lindsay Baronets
