= List of peers 1660–1669 =

This page lists all peers who held extant titles between 1660 and 1669.

== Peerage of England ==
| Title | Holder | Date gained | Date lost | Notes |
|---|---|---|---|---|
| Duke of Cornwall (1337) | none | 1649 | 1688 | |
| Duke of Norfolk (1483) | Thomas Howard, 5th Duke of Norfolk | 1660 | 1677 | The 23rd Earl of Arundel was restored to the Dukedom |
| Duke of Somerset (1547) | William Seymour, 2nd Duke of Somerset | 1660 | 1660 | Restored; also 1st Marquess of Hertford (1641); died |
| Duke of Somerset (1547) | William Seymour, 3rd Duke of Somerset | 1660 | 1671 | |
| Duke of Buckingham (1623) | George Villiers, 2nd Duke of Buckingham | 1628 | 1687 | |
| Duke of Richmond (1641) | Esmé Stewart, 2nd Duke of Richmond | 1655 | 1660 | Died |
| Duke of Richmond (1641) | Charles Stewart, 3rd Duke of Richmond | 1660 | 1672 | |
| Duke of Cumberland (1644) | Prince Rupert of the Rhine | 1644 | 1682 | |
| Duke of York (1644) | James Stuart | 1644 | 1685 | |
| Duke of Gloucester (1659) | Henry Stuart, Duke of Gloucester | 1659 | 1660 | Died, title extinct |
| Duke of Albemarle (1660) | George Monck, 1st Duke of Albemarle | 1660 | 1670 | New creation |
| Duke of Monmouth (1663) | James Scott, 1st Duke of Monmouth | 1663 | 1685 | New creation |
| Duke of Cambridge (1664) | James Stuart, Duke of Cambridge | 1664 | 1667 | New creation; died, title extinct |
| Duke of Newcastle-upon-Tyne (1665) | William Cavendish, 1st Duke of Newcastle | 1665 | 1676 | New creation for the 1st Marquess of Newcastle-upon-Tyne |
| Duke of Kendal (1666) | Charles Stuart, Duke of Kendal | 1666 | 1667 | New creation; died, title extinct |
| Duke of Cambridge (1667) | Edgar Stuart, Duke of Cambridge | 1667 | 1671 | New creation |
| Marquess of Winchester (1551) | John Paulet, 5th Marquess of Winchester | 1628 | 1675 | |
| Marquess of Worcester (1642) | Edward Somerset, 2nd Marquess of Worcester | 1646 | 1667 | Died |
| Marquess of Worcester (1642) | Henry Somerset, 3rd Marquess of Worcester | 1667 | 1700 | |
| Marquess of Dorchester (1645) | Henry Pierrepont, 1st Marquess of Dorchester | 1645 | 1680 | |
| Earl of Oxford (1142) | Aubrey de Vere, 20th Earl of Oxford | 1632 | 1703 | |
| Earl of Shrewsbury (1442) | Francis Talbot, 11th Earl of Shrewsbury | 1654 | 1668 | Died |
| Earl of Shrewsbury (1442) | Charles Talbot, 12th Earl of Shrewsbury | 1668 | 1718 | |
| Earl of Kent (1465) | Anthony Grey, 11th Earl of Kent | 1651 | 1702 | |
| Earl of Derby (1485) | Charles Stanley, 8th Earl of Derby | 1651 | 1672 | |
| Earl of Rutland (1525) | John Manners, 8th Earl of Rutland | 1641 | 1679 | |
| Earl of Huntingdon (1529) | Theophilus Hastings, 7th Earl of Huntingdon | 1656 | 1701 | |
| Earl of Southampton (1547) | Thomas Wriothesley, 4th Earl of Southampton | 1624 | 1667 | Died, title extinct |
| Earl of Bedford (1550) | William Russell, 5th Earl of Bedford | 1641 | 1700 | |
| Earl of Pembroke (1551) | Philip Herbert, 5th Earl of Pembroke | 1649 | 1669 | Died |
| Earl of Pembroke (1551) | William Herbert, 6th Earl of Pembroke | 1669 | 1674 | |
| Earl of Devon (1553) | William Courtenay, de jure 5th Earl of Devon | 1638 | 1702 | |
| Earl of Northumberland (1557) | Algernon Percy, 10th Earl of Northumberland | 1632 | 1668 | Died |
| Earl of Northumberland (1557) | Josceline Percy, 11th Earl of Northumberland | 1668 | 1670 | |
| Earl of Lincoln (1572) | Theophilus Clinton, 4th Earl of Lincoln | 1619 | 1667 | Died |
| Earl of Lincoln (1572) | Edward Clinton, 5th Earl of Lincoln | 1667 | 1692 | |
| Earl of Nottingham (1596) | Charles Howard, 3rd Earl of Nottingham | 1642 | 1681 | |
| Earl of Suffolk (1603) | James Howard, 3rd Earl of Suffolk | 1640 | 1689 | |
| Earl of Dorset (1604) | Richard Sackville, 5th Earl of Dorset | 1657 | 1677 | |
| Earl of Exeter (1605) | David Cecil, 3rd Earl of Exeter | 1643 | 1678 | |
| Earl of Salisbury (1605) | William Cecil, 2nd Earl of Salisbury | 1612 | 1668 | Died |
| Earl of Salisbury (1605) | James Cecil, 3rd Earl of Salisbury | 1668 | 1683 | |
| Earl of Bridgewater (1617) | John Egerton, 2nd Earl of Bridgewater | 1649 | 1686 | |
| Earl of Northampton (1618) | James Compton, 3rd Earl of Northampton | 1643 | 1681 | |
| Earl of Leicester (1618) | Robert Sidney, 2nd Earl of Leicester | 1626 | 1677 | |
| Earl of Warwick (1618) | Charles Rich, 4th Earl of Warwick | 1659 | 1673 | |
| Earl of Devonshire (1618) | William Cavendish, 3rd Earl of Devonshire | 1628 | 1684 | |
| Earl of Carlisle (1622) | James Hay, 2nd Earl of Carlisle | 1636 | 1660 | Died, title extinct |
| Earl of Denbigh (1622) | Basil Feilding, 2nd Earl of Denbigh | 1643 | 1675 | |
| Earl of Bristol (1622) | George Digby, 2nd Earl of Bristol | 1653 | 1677 | |
| Earl of Middlesex (1622) | Lionel Cranfield, 3rd Earl of Middlesex | 1651 | 1674 | |
| Earl of Anglesey (1623) | Charles Villiers, 2nd Earl of Anglesey | 1630 | 1661 | Died, title extinct |
| Earl of Holland (1624) | Robert Rich, 2nd Earl of Holland | 1649 | 1675 | |
| Earl of Clare (1624) | John Holles, 2nd Earl of Clare | 1637 | 1666 | Died |
| Earl of Clare (1624) | Gilbert Holles, 3rd Earl of Clare | 1666 | 1689 | |
| Earl of Bolingbroke (1624) | Oliver St John, 2nd Earl of Bolingbroke | 1646 | 1688 | |
| Earl of Westmorland (1624) | Mildmay Fane, 2nd Earl of Westmorland | 1629 | 1666 | Died |
| Earl of Westmorland (1624) | Charles Fane, 3rd Earl of Westmorland | 1666 | 1691 | |
| Earl of Cleveland (1626) | Thomas Wentworth, 1st Earl of Cleveland | 1626 | 1667 | Died, title extinct |
| Earl of Manchester (1626) | Edward Montagu, 2nd Earl of Manchester | 1642 | 1671 | |
| Earl of Marlborough (1626) | James Ley, 3rd Earl of Marlborough | 1638 | 1665 | Died |
| Earl of Marlborough (1626) | William Ley, 4th Earl of Marlborough | 1665 | 1679 | |
| Earl of Mulgrave (1626) | John Sheffield, 3rd Earl of Mulgrave | 1658 | 1721 | |
| Earl of Berkshire (1626) | Thomas Howard, 1st Earl of Berkshire | 1626 | 1669 | Died |
| Earl of Berkshire (1626) | Charles Howard, 2nd Earl of Berkshire | 1669 | 1679 | |
| Earl of Monmouth (1626) | Henry Carey, 2nd Earl of Monmouth | 1639 | 1661 | Died, title extinct |
| Earl Rivers (1626) | Thomas Savage, 3rd Earl Rivers | 1654 | 1694 | |
| Earl of Lindsey (1626) | Montagu Bertie, 2nd Earl of Lindsey | 1642 | 1666 | Died |
| Earl of Lindsey (1626) | Robert Bertie, 3rd Earl of Lindsey | 1666 | 1701 | |
| Earl of Dover (1628) | Henry Carey, 1st Earl of Dover | 1628 | 1666 | Died |
| Earl of Dover (1628) | John Carey, 2nd Earl of Dover | 1666 | 1677 | |
| Earl of Peterborough (1628) | Henry Mordaunt, 2nd Earl of Peterborough | 1643 | 1697 | |
| Earl of Stamford (1628) | Henry Grey, 1st Earl of Stamford | 1628 | 1673 | |
| Earl of Winchilsea (1628) | Heneage Finch, 3rd Earl of Winchilsea | 1639 | 1689 | |
| Earl of Carnarvon (1628) | Charles Dormer, 2nd Earl of Carnarvon | 1643 | 1709 | |
| Earl of Newport (1628) | Mountjoy Blount, 1st Earl of Newport | 1628 | 1666 | Died |
| Earl of Newport (1628) | Mountjoy Blount, 2nd Earl of Newport | 1666 | 1675 | |
| Earl of Chesterfield (1628) | Philip Stanhope, 2nd Earl of Chesterfield | 1656 | 1714 | |
| Earl of Thanet (1628) | John Tufton, 2nd Earl of Thanet | 1632 | 1664 | Died |
| Earl of Thanet (1628) | Nicholas Tufton, 3rd Earl of Thanet | 1664 | 1679 | |
| Earl of Portland (1633) | Jerome Weston, 2nd Earl of Portland | 1635 | 1663 | Died |
| Earl of Portland (1633) | Charles Weston, 3rd Earl of Portland | 1663 | 1665 | Died |
| Earl of Portland (1633) | Thomas Weston, 4th Earl of Portland | 1665 | 1668 | |
| Earl of Strafford (1640) | William Wentworth, 2nd Earl of Strafford | 1662 | 1695 | Restored |
| Earl of Strafford (1641) | William Wentworth, 1st Earl of Strafford | 1641 | 1695 | Restored to Earldom of Strafford (1640), see above |
| Earl of Sunderland (1643) | Robert Spencer, 2nd Earl of Sunderland | 1643 | 1702 | |
| Earl of Sussex (1644) | James Savile, 2nd Earl of Sussex | 1659 | 1671 | |
| Earl of Norwich (1644) | George Goring, 1st Earl of Norwich | 1644 | 1663 | Died |
| Earl of Norwich (1644) | Charles Goring, 2nd Earl of Norwich | 1663 | 1671 | |
| Earl of Scarsdale (1645) | Nicholas Leke, 2nd Earl of Scarsdale | 1655 | 1681 | |
| Earl of Lichfield (1645) | Charles Stewart, 1st Earl of Lichfield | 1645 | 1672 | Succeeded as Duke of Richmond, see above |
| Earl of Rochester (1652) | John Wilmot, 2nd Earl of Rochester | 1658 | 1680 | |
| Earl of St Albans (1660) | Henry Jermyn, 1st Earl of St Albans | 1660 | 1684 | New creation |
| Earl of Chesterfield (1660) | Katherine Stanhope, Countess of Chesterfield | 1660 | 1667 | New creation, for life only; died, title extinct |
| Earl of Sandwich (1660) | Edward Montagu, 1st Earl of Sandwich | 1660 | 1672 | New creation |
| Earl of Guilford (1660) | Elizabeth Boyle, Countess of Guilford | 1660 | 1667 | New creation, for life only; died, title extinct |
| Earl of Brecknock (1660) | James Butler, 1st Earl of Brecknock | 1660 | 1688 | New creation; Duke of Ormonde in the Peerage of Ireland |
| Earl of Anglesey (1661) | Arthur Annesley, 1st Earl of Anglesey | 1661 | 1686 | New creation |
| Earl of Bath (1661) | John Granville, 1st Earl of Bath | 1661 | 1701 | New creation |
| Earl of Cardigan (1661) | Thomas Brudenell, 1st Earl of Cardigan | 1661 | 1663 | New creation; died |
| Earl of Cardigan (1661) | Robert Brudenell, 2nd Earl of Cardigan | 1663 | 1703 | |
| Earl of Clarendon (1661) | Edward Hyde, 1st Earl of Clarendon | 1661 | 1674 | New creation; cr. Baron Hyde in 1660 |
| Earl of Essex (1661) | Arthur Capell, 1st Earl of Essex | 1661 | 1683 | New creation |
| Earl of Carlisle (1661) | Charles Howard, 1st Earl of Carlisle | 1661 | 1685 | New creation |
| Earl of Craven (1664) | William Craven, 1st Earl of Craven | 1664 | 1697 | New creation |
| Earl of Falmouth (1664) | Charles Berkeley, 1st Earl of Falmouth | 1664 | 1665 | New creation; died, title extinct |
| Earl of Ailesbury (1664) | Robert Bruce, 1st Earl of Ailesbury | 1664 | 1685 | New creation; Earl of Elgin in the Peerage of Scotland |
| Earl of Burlington (1664) | Richard Boyle, 1st Earl of Burlington | 1664 | 1698 | New creation; Earl of Cork in the Peerage of Ireland |
| Viscount Hereford (1550) | Leicester Devereux, 6th Viscount Hereford | 1658 | 1676 | |
| Viscount Montagu (1554) | Francis Browne, 3rd Viscount Montagu | 1629 | 1682 | |
| Viscount Saye and Sele (1624) | William Fiennes, 1st Viscount Saye and Sele | 1624 | 1662 | Died |
| Viscount Saye and Sele (1624) | James Fiennes, 2nd Viscount Saye and Sele | 1662 | 1674 | |
| Viscount Conway (1627) | Edward Conway, 3rd Viscount Conway | 1655 | 1683 | |
| Viscount Campden (1628) | Baptist Noel, 3rd Viscount Campden | 1643 | 1682 | |
| Viscount Stafford (1640) | William Howard, 1st Viscount Stafford | 1640 | 1680 | |
| Viscount Fauconberg (1643) | Thomas Belasyse, 2nd Viscount Fauconberg | 1652 | 1700 | |
| Viscount Mordaunt (1659) | John Mordaunt, 1st Viscount Mordaunt | 1659 | 1675 | |
| Viscount Halifax (1668) | George Savile, 1st Viscount Halifax | 1668 | 1695 | New creation |
| Baron FitzWalter (1295) | Benjamin Mildmay, 17th Baron FitzWalter | 1667 | 1679 | Barony was dormant since 1629 |
| Baron de Clifford (1299) | Anne Clifford, 14th Baroness de Clifford | 1605 | 1676 | |
| Baron Morley (1299) | Thomas Parker, 15th Baron Morley | 1655 | 1697 | |
| Baron Dacre (1321) | Francis Lennard, 14th Baron Dacre | 1630 | 1662 | Died |
| Baron Dacre (1321) | Thomas Lennard, 15th Baron Dacre | 1662 | 1715 | |
| Baron Grey of Ruthyn (1325) | Susan Longueville, 13th Baroness Grey de Ruthyn | 1643 | 1676 | |
| Baron Darcy de Knayth (1332) | Conyers Darcy, 8th Baron Darcy de Knayth | 1653 | 1689 | |
| Baron Berkeley (1421) | George Berkeley, 9th Baron Berkeley | 1658 | 1698 | |
| Baron Dudley (1440) | Frances Ward, 6th Baroness Dudley | 1643 | 1697 | |
| Baron Stourton (1448) | William Stourton, 11th Baron Stourton | 1633 | 1672 | |
| Baron Willoughby de Broke (1491) | Greville Verney, 9th Baron Willoughby de Broke | 1648 | 1668 | Died |
| Baron Willoughby de Broke (1491) | William Verney, 10th Baron Willoughby de Broke | 1668 | 1683 | |
| Baron Monteagle (1514) | Thomas Parker, 6th Baron Monteagle | 1655 | 1697 | |
| Baron Vaux of Harrowden (1523) | Edward Vaux, 4th Baron Vaux of Harrowden | 1595 | 1661 | Died |
| Baron Vaux of Harrowden (1523) | Henry Vaux, 5th Baron Vaux of Harrowden | 1661 | 1663 | Died, Barony fell into abeyance until 1838 |
| Baron Sandys of the Vine (1529) | William Sandys, 6th Baron Sandys | 1645 | 1668 | Died |
| Baron Sandys of the Vine (1529) | Henry Sandys, 7th Baron Sandys | 1668 | 1680 | |
| Baron Windsor (1529) | Thomas Hickman-Windsor, 7th Baron Windsor | 1660 | 1687 | Abeyance terminated |
| Baron Wentworth (1529) | Henrietta Wentworth, 6th Baroness Wentworth | 1667 | 1686 | Barony previously held by the Earl of Cleveland |
| Baron Eure (1544) | George Eure, 6th Baron Eure | 1652 | 1672 | |
| Baron Wharton (1545) | Philip Wharton, 4th Baron Wharton | 1625 | 1695 | |
| Baron Willoughby of Parham (1547) | Francis Willoughby, 5th Baron Willoughby of Parham | 1618 | 1666 | Died |
| Baron Willoughby of Parham (1547) | William Willoughby, 6th Baron Willoughby of Parham | 1666 | 1673 | |
| Baron Paget (1552) | William Paget, 5th Baron Paget | 1629 | 1678 | |
| Baron North (1554) | Dudley North, 3rd Baron North | 1600 | 1666 | Died |
| Baron North (1554) | Dudley North, 4th Baron North | 1666 | 1677 | |
| Baron Chandos (1554) | William Brydges, 7th Baron Chandos | 1655 | 1676 | |
| Baron De La Warr (1570) | Charles West, 5th Baron De La Warr | 1628 | 1687 | |
| Baron Norreys (1572) | James Bertie, 5th Baron Norreys | 1657 | 1699 | |
| Baron Gerard (1603) | Charles Gerard, 4th Baron Gerard | 1640 | 1667 | Died |
| Baron Gerard (1603) | Digby Gerard, 5th Baron Gerard | 1667 | 1684 | |
| Baron Petre (1603) | William Petre, 4th Baron Petre | 1638 | 1684 | |
| Baron Arundell of Wardour (1605) | Henry Arundell, 3rd Baron Arundell of Wardour | 1643 | 1694 | |
| Baron Stanhope of Harrington (1605) | Charles Stanhope, 2nd Baron Stanhope | 1621 | 1675 | |
| Baron Clifton (1608) | Mary Butler, 5th Baroness Clifton | 1660 | 1668 | Title previously held by the Dukes of Lennox; died, title succeeded by the Duke of Lennox |
| Baron Teynham (1616) | John Roper, 3rd Baron Teynham | 1628 | 1673 | |
| Baron Brooke (1621) | Robert Greville, 4th Baron Brooke | 1658 | 1677 | |
| Baron Montagu of Boughton (1621) | Edward Montagu, 2nd Baron Montagu of Boughton | 1644 | 1684 | |
| Baron Grey of Warke (1624) | William Grey, 1st Baron Grey of Werke | 1624 | 1674 | |
| Baron Robartes (1625) | John Robartes, 2nd Baron Robartes | 1625 | 1685 | |
| Baron Craven (1627) | Willian Craven, 1st Baron Craven | 1627 | 1697 | Created Earl of Craven, see above |
| Baron Lovelace (1627) | John Lovelace, 2nd Baron Lovelace | 1634 | 1670 | |
| Baron Poulett (1627) | John Poulett, 2nd Baron Poulett | 1649 | 1665 | Died |
| Baron Poulett (1627) | John Poulett, 3rd Baron Poulett | 1665 | 1679 | |
| Baron Clifford (1628) | Elizabeth Boyle, Baroness Clifford | 1643 | 1691 | |
| Baron Brudenell (1628) | Thomas Brudenell, 1st Baron Brudenell | 1628 | 1663 | Created Earl of Cardigan, see above |
| Baron Maynard (1628) | William Maynard, 2nd Baron Maynard | 1640 | 1699 | |
| Baron Coventry (1628) | Thomas Coventry, 2nd Baron Coventry | 1640 | 1661 | Died |
| Baron Coventry (1628) | George Coventry, 3rd Baron Coventry | 1661 | 1680 | |
| Baron Mohun of Okehampton (1628) | Warwick Mohun, 2nd Baron Mohun of Okehampton | 1640 | 1665 | Died |
| Baron Mohun of Okehampton (1628) | Charles Mohun, 3rd Baron Mohun of Okehampton | 1665 | 1677 | |
| Baron Powis (1629) | Percy Herbert, 2nd Baron Powis | 1655 | 1667 | Died |
| Baron Powis (1629) | William Herbert, 3rd Baron Powis | 1667 | 1696 | |
| Baron Herbert of Chirbury (1629) | Edward Herbert, 3rd Baron Herbert of Chirbury | 1655 | 1678 | |
| Baron Finch (1640) | John Finch, 1st Baron Finch | 1640 | 1660 | Died, title extinct |
| Baron (A)bergavenny (1641) | John Nevill, 1st Baron Bergavenny | 1641 | 1662 | Died, title extinct |
| Baron Seymour of Trowbridge (1641) | Francis Seymour, 1st Baron Seymour of Trowbridge | 1641 | 1664 | |
| Baron Seymour of Trowbridge (1641) | Charles Seymour, 2nd Baron Seymour of Trowbridge | 1664 | 1665 | Died |
| Baron Seymour of Trowbridge (1641) | Francis Seymour, 3rd Baron Seymour of Trowbridge | 1665 | 1678 | |
| Baron Capell of Hadham (1641) | Arthur Capell, 2nd Baron Capell of Hadham | 1649 | 1683 | Created Earl of Essex, see above |
| Baron Hatton (1642) | Christopher Hatton, 1st Baron Hatton | 1642 | 1670 | |
| Baron Newport (1642) | Francis Newport, 2nd Baron Newport | 1651 | 1708 | |
| Baron Leigh (1643) | Thomas Leigh, 1st Baron Leigh | 1643 | 1672 | |
| Baron Jermyn (1643) | Henry Jermyn, 1st Baron Jermyn | 1643 | 1684 | Created Earl of St Albans, see above |
| Baron Byron (1643) | Richard Byron, 2nd Baron Byron | 1652 | 1679 | |
| Baron Loughborough (1643) | Henry Hastings, 1st Baron Loughborough | 1643 | 1667 | Died, title extinct |
| Baron Widdrington (1643) | William Widdrington, 2nd Baron Widdrington | 1651 | 1675 | |
| Baron Ward (1644) | Humble Ward, 1st Baron Ward | 1644 | 1670 | |
| Baron Colepeper (1644) | John Colepeper, 1st Baron Colepeper | 1644 | 1660 | Died |
| Baron Colepeper (1644) | Thomas Colepeper, 2nd Baron Colepeper | 1660 | 1689 | |
| Baron Astley of Reading (1644) | Isaac Astley, 2nd Baron Astley of Reading | 1652 | 1662 | Died |
| Baron Astley of Reading (1644) | Jacob Astley, 3rd Baron Astley of Reading | 1662 | 1688 | |
| Baron Cobham (1645) | John Brooke, 1st Baron Cobham | 1645 | 1660 | Died, title extinct |
| Baron Lucas of Shenfield (1645) | John Lucas, 1st Baron Lucas of Shenfield | 1645 | 1671 | |
| Baron Belasyse (1645) | John Belasyse, 1st Baron Belasyse | 1645 | 1689 | |
| Baron Rockingham (1645) | Edward Watson, 2nd Baron Rockingham | 1653 | 1689 | |
| Baron Gerard of Brandon (1645) | Charles Gerard, 1st Baron Gerard of Brandon | 1645 | 1694 | |
| Baron Lexinton (1645) | Robert Sutton, 1st Baron Lexinton | 1645 | 1668 | Died |
| Baron Lexinton (1645) | Robert Sutton, 2nd Baron Lexinton | 1668 | 1723 | |
| Baron Wotton (1650) | Charles Kirkhoven, 1st Baron Wotton | 1650 | 1683 | |
| Baron Langdale (1658) | Marmaduke Langdale, 1st Baron Langdale | 1658 | 1661 | |
| Baron Langdale (1658) | Marmaduke Langdale, 2nd Baron Langdale | 1661 | 1703 | |
| Baron Crofts (1658) | William Crofts, 1st Baron Crofts | 1658 | 1677 | |
| Baron Berkeley of Stratton (1658) | John Berkeley, 1st Baron Berkeley of Stratton | 1658 | 1678 | |
| Baron Ashley (1661) | Anthony Ashley Cooper, 1st Baron Ashley | 1661 | 1683 | New creation |
| Baron Cornwallis (1661) | Frederick Cornwallis, 1st Baron Cornwallis | 1661 | 1662 | New creation; died |
| Baron Cornwallis (1661) | Charles Cornwallis, 2nd Baron Cornwallis | 1662 | 1673 | |
| Baron Crew (1661) | John Crew, 1st Baron Crew | 1661 | 1679 | New creation |
| Baron Delamer (1661) | George Booth, 1st Baron Delamer | 1661 | 1684 | New creation |
| Baron Holles (1661) | Denzil Holles, 1st Baron Holles | 1661 | 1680 | New creation |
| Baron Townshend (1661) | Horatio Townshend, 1st Baron Townshend | 1661 | 1687 | New creation |
| Baron (A)bergavenny (1662) | George Nevill, 11th Baron Bergavenny | Aft. 1662 | 1666 | New creation; died |
| Baron (A)bergavenny (1662) | George Nevill, 12th Baron Bergavenny | 1666 | 1695 | |
| Baron Lucas of Crudwell (1663) | Mary Grey, 1st Baroness Lucas | 1663 | 1702 | New creation |
| Baron Arundell of Trerice (1664) | Richard Arundell, 1st Baron Arundell of Trerice | 1664 | 1687 | New creation |
| Baron Arlington (1664) | Henry Bennet, 1st Baron Arlington | 1664 | 1685 | New creation |
| Baron Frescheville (1665) | John Frescheville, 1st Baron Frescheville | 1665 | 1682 | New creation |
| Baron Howard of Castle Rising (1669) | Henry Howard, 1st Baron Howard of Castle Rising | 1669 | 1684 | New creation |

== Peerage of Scotland ==
| Title | Holder | Date gained | Date lost | Notes |
|---|---|---|---|---|
| Duke of Rothesay (1398) | none | 1649 | 1688 | |
| Duke of Lennox (1581) | Esmé Stewart, 5th Duke of Lennox | 1655 | 1660 | Died |
| Duke of Lennox (1581) | Charles Stewart, 6th Duke of Lennox | 1660 | 1672 | |
| Duke of Hamilton (1643) | Anne Hamilton, 3rd Duchess of Hamilton | 1651 | 1698 | |
| Duke of Albany (1660) | Prince James, Duke of Albany | 1660 | 1685 | New creation |
| Duke of Buccleuch (1663) | Anne Scott, 1st Duchess of Buccleuch | 1663 | 1732 | New creation |
| Marquess of Huntly (1599) | George Gordon, 4th Marquess of Huntly | 1653 | 1716 | |
| Marquess of Douglas (1633) | William Douglas, 1st Marquess of Douglas | 1633 | 1660 | Died |
| Marquess of Douglas (1633) | James Douglas, 2nd Marquess of Douglas | 1660 | 1700 | |
| Marquess of Argyll (1641) | Archibald Campbell, 1st Marquess of Argyll | 1641 | 1661 | Attainted and all his honours forfeit |
| Marquess of Montrose (1644) | James Graham, 2nd Marquess of Montrose | 1650 | 1669 | Died |
| Marquess of Montrose (1644) | James Graham, 3rd Marquess of Montrose | 1669 | 1684 | |
| Earl of Argyll (1457) | Archibald Campbell, 9th Earl of Argyll | 1663 | 1685 | Restored to the Earldom |
| Earl of Crawford (1398) | John Lindsay, 17th Earl of Crawford | 1652 | 1678 | |
| Earl of Erroll (1452) | Gilbert Hay, 11th Earl of Erroll | 1636 | 1674 | |
| Earl Marischal (1458) | William Keith, 7th Earl Marischal | 1635 | 1671 | |
| Earl of Sutherland (1235) | John Gordon, 14th Earl of Sutherland | 1615 | 1679 | |
| Earl of Mar (1114) | John Erskine, Earl of Mar | 1654 | 1668 | Died |
| Earl of Mar (1114) | Charles Erskine, Earl of Mar | 1668 | 1689 | |
| Earl of Rothes (1458) | John Leslie, 7th Earl of Rothes | 1641 | 1681 | |
| Earl of Morton (1458) | William Douglas, 9th Earl of Morton | 1649 | 1681 | |
| Earl of Menteith (1427) | William Graham, 7th Earl of Menteith | 1598 | 1661 | Died |
| Earl of Menteith (1427) | William Graham, 8th Earl of Menteith | 1661 | 1694 | |
| Earl of Glencairn (1488) | William Cunningham, 9th Earl of Glencairn | 1631 | 1664 | Died |
| Earl of Glencairn (1488) | Alexander Cunningham, 10th Earl of Glencairn | 1664 | 1670 | |
| Earl of Eglinton (1507) | Alexander Montgomerie, 6th Earl of Eglinton | 1612 | 1661 | Died |
| Earl of Eglinton (1507) | Hugh Montgomerie, 7th Earl of Eglinton | 1661 | 1669 | Died |
| Earl of Eglinton (1507) | Alexander Montgomerie, 8th Earl of Eglinton | 1669 | 1701 | |
| Earl of Cassilis (1509) | John Kennedy, 6th Earl of Cassilis | 1615 | 1668 | Died |
| Earl of Cassilis (1509) | John Kennedy, 7th Earl of Cassilis | 1668 | 1701 | |
| Earl of Caithness (1455) | George Sinclair, 6th Earl of Caithness | 1643 | 1672 | |
| Earl of Buchan (1469) | James Erskine, 7th Earl of Buchan | 1628 | 1664 | Died |
| Earl of Buchan (1469) | William Erskine, 8th Earl of Buchan | 1664 | 1695 | |
| Earl of Moray (1562) | Alexander Stuart, 5th Earl of Moray | 1653 | 1701 | |
| Earl of Linlithgow (1600) | George Livingston, 3rd Earl of Linlithgow | 1650 | 1690 | |
| Earl of Winton (1600) | George Seton, 4th Earl of Winton | 1650 | 1704 | |
| Earl of Home (1605) | James Home, 3rd Earl of Home | 1633 | 1666 | Died |
| Earl of Home (1605) | Alexander Home, 4th Earl of Home | 1666 | 1674 | |
| Earl of Perth (1605) | John Drummond, 2nd Earl of Perth | 1611 | 1662 | Died |
| Earl of Perth (1605) | James Drummond, 3rd Earl of Perth | 1662 | 1675 | |
| Earl of Dunfermline (1605) | Charles Seton, 2nd Earl of Dunfermline | 1622 | 1672 | |
| Earl of Wigtown (1606) | John Fleming, 3rd Earl of Wigtown | 1650 | 1665 | Died |
| Earl of Wigtown (1606) | John Fleming, 4th Earl of Wigtown | 1665 | 1668 | Died |
| Earl of Wigtown (1606) | William Fleming, 5th Earl of Wigtown | 1668 | 1681 | |
| Earl of Abercorn (1606) | James Hamilton, 2nd Earl of Abercorn | 1618 | 1670 | |
| Earl of Kinghorne (1606) | Patrick Lyon, 3rd Earl of Kinghorne | 1646 | 1695 | |
| Earl of Roxburghe (1616) | William Ker, 2nd Earl of Roxburghe | 1650 | 1675 | |
| Earl of Kellie (1619) | Alexander Erskine, 3rd Earl of Kellie | 1643 | 1677 | |
| Earl of Buccleuch (1619) | Mary Scott, 3rd Countess of Buccleuch | 1651 | 1661 | Died |
| Earl of Buccleuch (1619) | Anne Scott, 4th Countess of Buccleuch | 1661 | 1732 | Created Duchess of Buccleuch, see above |
| Earl of Haddington (1619) | John Hamilton, 4th Earl of Haddington | 1645 | 1669 | Died |
| Earl of Haddington (1619) | Charles Hamilton, 5th Earl of Haddington | 1669 | 1685 | |
| Earl of Nithsdale (1620) | Robert Maxwell, 2nd Earl of Nithsdale | 1646 | 1667 | Died |
| Earl of Nithsdale (1620) | John Maxwell, 3rd Earl of Nithsdale | 1667 | 1677 | |
| Earl of Galloway (1623) | James Stewart, 2nd Earl of Galloway | 1649 | 1671 | |
| Earl of Seaforth (1623) | Kenneth Mackenzie, 3rd Earl of Seaforth | 1651 | 1678 | |
| Earl of Lauderdale (1624) | John Maitland, 2nd Earl of Lauderdale | 1645 | 1682 | |
| Earl of Tullibardine (1628) | James Murray, 2nd Earl of Tullibardine | 1644 | 1670 | |
| Earl of Atholl (1629) | John Murray, 2nd Earl of Atholl | 1642 | 1703 | |
| Earl of Lothian (1631) | William Kerr, 1st Earl of Lothian | 1631 | 1675 | |
| Earl of Airth (1633) | William Graham, 1st Earl of Airth | 1633 | 1661 | Died |
| Earl of Airth (1633) | William Graham, 2nd Earl of Airth | 1661 | 1694 | |
| Earl of Loudoun (1633) | John Campbell, 1st Earl of Loudoun | 1633 | 1662 | Died |
| Earl of Loudoun (1633) | James Campbell, 2nd Earl of Loudoun | 1662 | 1684 | |
| Earl of Kinnoull (1633) | William Hay, 4th Earl of Kinnoull | 1650 | 1677 | |
| Earl of Dumfries (1633) | William Crichton, 2nd Earl of Dumfries | 1643 | 1691 | |
| Earl of Queensberry (1633) | James Douglas, 2nd Earl of Queensberry | 1640 | 1671 | |
| Earl of Stirling (1633) | Henry Alexander, 4th Earl of Stirling | 1644 | 1691 | |
| Earl of Elgin (1633) | Thomas Bruce, 1st Earl of Elgin | 1633 | 1663 | Died |
| Earl of Elgin (1633) | Robert Bruce, 2nd Earl of Elgin | 1663 | 1685 | |
| Earl of Southesk (1633) | James Carnegie, 2nd Earl of Southesk | 1658 | 1669 | Died |
| Earl of Southesk (1633) | Robert Carnegie, 3rd Earl of Southesk | 1669 | 1688 | |
| Earl of Traquair (1633) | John Stewart, 2nd Earl of Traquair | 1659 | 1666 | Died |
| Earl of Traquair (1633) | William Stewart, 3rd Earl of Traquair | 1666 | 1673 | |
| Earl of Ancram (1633) | Charles Kerr, 2nd Earl of Ancram | 1654 | 1690 | |
| Earl of Wemyss (1633) | David Wemyss, 2nd Earl of Wemyss | 1649 | 1679 | |
| Earl of Dalhousie (1633) | William Ramsay, 1st Earl of Dalhousie | 1633 | 1672 | |
| Earl of Findlater (1638) | James Ogilvy, 3rd Earl of Findlater | 1658 | 1711 | |
| Earl of Airlie (1639) | James Ogilvy, 1st Earl of Airlie | 1639 | 1665 | Died |
| Earl of Airlie (1639) | James Ogilvy, 2nd Earl of Airlie | 1665 | 1703 | |
| Earl of Carnwath (1639) | Gavin Dalzell, 2nd Earl of Carnwath | 1654 | 1674 | |
| Earl of Callendar (1641) | James Livingston, 1st Earl of Callendar | 1641 | 1674 | |
| Earl of Leven (1641) | Alexander Leslie, 1st Earl of Leven | 1641 | 1661 | |
| Earl of Leven (1641) | Alexander Leslie, 2nd Earl of Leven | 1661 | 1664 | Died |
| Earl of Leven (1641) | Margaret Leslie, Countess of Leven | 1664 | 1674 | |
| Earl of Hartfell (1643) | James Johnstone, 1st Earl of Annandale and Hartfell | 1655 | 1672 | Resigned the Earldom, regranted, see below |
| Earl of Dysart (1643) | Elizabeth Tollemache, 2nd Countess of Dysart | 1654 | 1698 | |
| Earl of Panmure (1646) | Patrick Maule, 1st Earl of Panmure | 1646 | 1661 | Died |
| Earl of Panmure (1646) | George Maule, 2nd Earl of Panmure | 1661 | 1671 | |
| Earl of Selkirk (1646) | William Hamilton, 1st Earl of Selkirk | 1646 | 1694 | |
| Earl of Tweeddale (1646) | John Hay, 2nd Earl of Tweeddale | 1653 | 1697 | |
| Earl of Northesk (1647) | John Carnegie, 1st Earl of Northesk | 1647 | 1667 | Died |
| Earl of Northesk (1647) | David Carnegie, 2nd Earl of Northesk | 1667 | 1679 | |
| Earl of Kincardine (1647) | Edward Bruce, 1st Earl of Kincardine | 1647 | 1662 | Died |
| Earl of Kincardine (1647) | Alexander Bruce, 2nd Earl of Kincardine | 1662 | 1680 | |
| Earl of Balcarres (1651) | Charles Lindsay, 2nd Earl of Balcarres | 1659 | 1662 | Died |
| Earl of Balcarres (1651) | Colin Lindsay, 3rd Earl of Balcarres | 1662 | 1722 | |
| Earl of Tarras (1660) | Walter Scott, Earl of Tarras | 1660 | 1693 | New creation, life peerage |
| Earl of Aboyne (1660) | Charles Gordon, 1st Earl of Aboyne | 1660 | 1681 | New creation |
| Earl of Middleton (1660) | John Middleton, 1st Earl of Middleton | 1660 | 1674 | New creation |
| Earl of Newburgh (1660) | James Levingston, 1st Earl of Newburgh | 1660 | 1670 | New creation |
| Earl of Dundee (1660) | John Scrymgeour, 1st Earl of Dundee | 1660 | 1668 | New creation; died, title dormant until 1953 |
| Earl of Annandale and Hartfell (1661) | James Johnstone, 1st Earl of Annandale and Hartfell | 1661 | 1672 | New creation |
| Earl of Kilmarnock (1661) | William Boyd, 1st Earl of Kilmarnock | 1661 | 1692 | New creation |
| Earl of Forfar (1661) | Archibald Douglas, 1st Earl of Forfar | 1661 | 1712 | New creation |
| Earl of Teviot (1663) | Andrew Rutherford, 1st Earl of Teviot | 1663 | 1664 | New creation; died, title extinct |
| Earl of Dundonald (1669) | William Cochrane, 1st Earl of Dundonald | 1669 | 1685 | New creation |
| Viscount of Falkland (1620) | Henry Cary, 4th Viscount of Falkland | 1649 | 1663 | Died |
| Viscount of Falkland (1620) | Anthony Cary, 5th Viscount of Falkland | 1663 | 1694 | |
| Viscount of Dunbar (1620) | John Constable, 2nd Viscount of Dunbar | 1645 | 1668 | Died |
| Viscount of Dunbar (1620) | Robert Constable, 3rd Viscount of Dunbar | 1668 | 1714 | |
| Viscount of Stormont (1621) | David Murray, 4th Viscount of Stormont | 1658 | 1668 | Died |
| Viscount of Stormont (1621) | David Murray, 5th Viscount of Stormont | 1668 | 1731 | |
| Viscount of Kenmure (1633) | Robert Gordon, 4th Viscount of Kenmure | 1643 | 1663 | Died |
| Viscount of Kenmure (1633) | Alexander Gordon, 5th Viscount of Kenmure | 1663 | 1698 | |
| Viscount of Arbuthnott (1641) | Robert Arbuthnot, 2nd Viscount of Arbuthnott | 1655 | 1682 | |
| Viscount of Dudhope (1641) | John Scrymgeour, 3rd Viscount of Dudhope | 1644 | 1668 | Created Earl of Dundee, see above |
| Viscount of Frendraught (1642) | James Crichton, 2nd Viscount of Frendraught | 1650 | 1678 | |
| Viscount of Newburgh (1647) | James Levingston, 1st Viscount of Newburgh | 1647 | 1670 | Created Earl of Newburgh, see above |
| Viscount of Oxfuird (1651) | James Makgill, 1st Viscount of Oxfuird | 1651 | 1663 | Died |
| Viscount of Oxfuird (1651) | Robert Makgill, 2nd Viscount of Oxfuird | 1663 | 1706 | |
| Viscount of Kingston (1651) | Alexander Seton, 1st Viscount of Kingston | 1651 | 1691 | |
| Viscount of Irvine (1661) | Henry Ingram, 1st Viscount of Irvine | 1661 | 1666 | New creation; died |
| Viscount of Irvine (1661) | Edward Ingram, 2nd Viscount of Irvine | 1666 | 1668 | Died |
| Viscount of Irvine (1661) | Arthur Ingram, 3rd Viscount of Irvine | 1668 | 1702 | |
| Viscount of Kilsyth (1661) | James Livingston, 1st Viscount of Kilsyth | 1661 | 1661 | New creation; died |
| Viscount of Kilsyth (1661) | James Livingston, 2nd Viscount of Kilsyth | 1661 | 1706 | |
| Lord Somerville (1430) | James Somerville, 10th Lord Somerville | 1640 | 1677 | |
| Lord Forbes (1442) | Alexander Forbes, 10th Lord Forbes | 1641 | 1672 | |
| Lord Saltoun (1445) | Alexander Abernethy, 9th Lord Saltoun | 1612 | 1668 | Died |
| Lord Saltoun (1445) | Margaret Abernethy, 10th Lady Saltoun | 1668 | 1669 | Died |
| Lord Saltoun (1445) | Alexander Fraser, 11th Lord Saltoun | 1669 | 1693 | |
| Lord Gray (1445) | Andrew Gray, 7th Lord Gray | 1611 | 1663 | Died |
| Lord Gray (1445) | Patrick Gray, 8th Lord Gray | 1663 | 1711 | |
| Lord Sinclair (1449) | John Sinclair, 9th Lord Sinclair | 1615 | 1676 | |
| Lord Borthwick (1452) | John Borthwick, 9th Lord Borthwick | 1623 | 1675 | |
| Lord Boyd (1454) | William Boyd, 10th Lord Boyd | 1654 | 1692 | Created Earl of Kilmarnock, see above |
| Lord Oliphant (1455) | Patrick Oliphant, 6th Lord Oliphant | 1631 | 1680 | |
| Lord Cathcart (1460) | Alan Cathcart, 6th Lord Cathcart | 1628 | 1709 | |
| Lord Lovat (1464) | Hugh Fraser, 8th Lord Lovat | 1646 | 1672 | |
| Lord Sempill (1489) | Robert Sempill, 7th Lord Sempill | 1644 | 1675 | |
| Lord Herries of Terregles (1490) | John Maxwell, 7th Lord Herries of Terregles | 1631 | 1677 | Succeeded as the 3rd Earl of Nithsdale, see above |
| Lord Ross (1499) | George Ross, 11th Lord Ross | 1656 | 1682 | |
| Lord Elphinstone (1509) | Alexander Elphinstone, 7th Lord Elphinstone | 1654 | 1669 | |
| Lord Elphinstone (1509) | John Elphinstone, 8th Lord Elphinstone | 1669 | 1718 | |
| Lord Ochiltree (1543) | William Stewart, 5th Lord Ochiltree | 1658 | 1675 | |
| Lord Torphichen (1564) | Walter Sandilands, 6th Lord Torphichen | 1649 | 1696 | |
| Lord Spynie (1590) | George Lindsay, 3rd Lord Spynie | 1646 | 1671 | |
| Lord Lindores (1600) | James Leslie, 3rd Lord Lindores | 1649 | 1666 | Died |
| Lord Lindores (1600) | John Leslie, 4th Lord Lindores | 1666 | 1706 | |
| Lord Colville of Culross (1604) | John Colville, 4th Lord Colville of Culross | 1656 | 1680 | |
| Lord Balmerinoch (1606) | John Elphinstone, 3rd Lord Balmerino | 1649 | 1704 | |
| Lord Blantyre (1606) | Alexander Stewart, 4th Lord Blantyre | 1641 | 1670 | |
| Lord Coupar (1607) | James Elphinstone, 1st Lord Coupar | 1607 | 1669 | Died, title succeeded by the Lord Balmerinoch, see above |
| Lord Balfour of Burleigh (1607) | Robert Balfour, 2nd Lord Balfour of Burleigh | 1619 | 1663 | Died |
| Lord Balfour of Burleigh (1607) | John Balfour, 3rd Lord Balfour of Burleigh | 1663 | 1688 | |
| Lord Cranstoun (1609) | William Cranstoun, 3rd Lord Cranstoun | 1648 | 1664 | Died |
| Lord Cranstoun (1609) | James Cranstoun, 4th Lord Cranstoun | 1664 | 1688 | |
| Lord Maderty (1609) | David Drummond, 3rd Lord Madderty | 1647 | 1692 | |
| Lord Dingwall (1609) | Elizabeth Preston, 2nd Lady Dingwall | 1628 | 1684 | |
| Lord Cardross (1610) | David Erskine, 2nd Lord Cardross | 1634 | 1671 | |
| Lord Melville of Monymaill (1616) | George Melville, 4th Lord Melville | 1643 | 1707 | |
| Lord Aston of Forfar (1627) | Walter Aston, 2nd Lord Aston of Forfar | 1639 | 1678 | |
| Lord Fairfax of Cameron (1627) | Thomas Fairfax, 3rd Lord Fairfax of Cameron | 1648 | 1671 | |
| Lord Napier (1627) | Archibald Napier, 2nd Lord Napier | 1645 | 1660 | Died |
| Lord Napier (1627) | Archibald Napier, 3rd Lord Napier | 1660 | 1683 | |
| Lord Reay (1628) | John Mackay, 2nd Lord Reay | 1649 | 1681 | |
| Lord Cramond (1628) | Thomas Richardson, 2nd Lord Cramond | 1651 | 1674 | |
| Lord Forbes of Pitsligo (1633) | Alexander Forbes, 2nd Lord Forbes of Pitsligo | 1636 | 1690 | |
| Lord Kirkcudbright (1633) | John Maclellan, 3rd Lord Kirkcudbright | 1647 | 1664 | Died |
| Lord Kirkcudbright (1633) | William Maclellan, 4th Lord Kirkcudbright | 1664 | 1669 | |
| Lord Kirkcudbright (1633) | John Maclellan, 5th Lord Kirkcudbright | 1669 | 1678 | |
| Lord Fraser (1633) | Andrew Fraser, 2nd Lord Fraser | 1636 | 1674 | |
| Lord Forrester (1633) | James Baillie, 2nd Lord Forrester | 1654 | 1676 | |
| Lord Bargany (1641) | John Hamilton, 2nd Lord Bargany | 1658 | 1693 | |
| Lord Banff (1642) | George Ogilvy, 1st Lord Banff | 1642 | 1663 | Died |
| Lord Banff (1642) | George Ogilvy, 2nd Lord Banff | 1663 | 1668 | |
| Lord Banff (1642) | George Ogilvy, 3rd Lord Banff | 1668 | 1713 | |
| Lord Elibank (1643) | Patrick Murray, 2nd Lord Elibank | 1649 | 1661 | Died |
| Lord Elibank (1643) | Patrick Murray, 3rd Lord Elibank | 1661 | 1687 | |
| Lord Dunkeld (1645) | James Galloway, 1st Lord Dunkeld | 1645 | 1660 | Died |
| Lord Dunkeld (1645) | Thomas Galloway, 2nd Lord Dunkeld | 1660 | 1728 | |
| Lord Falconer of Halkerton (1646) | Alexander Falconer, 1st Lord Falconer of Halkerton | 1646 | 1671 | |
| Lord Abercrombie (1647) | James Sandilands, 2nd Lord Abercrombie | 1658 | 1681 | |
| Lord Belhaven and Stenton (1647) | John Hamilton, 1st Lord Belhaven and Stenton | 1647 | 1679 | |
| Lord Cochrane of Dundonald (1647) | William Cochrane, Lord Cochrane of Dundonald | 1647 | 1685 | Created Earl of Dundonald, see above |
| Lord Carmichael (1647) | James Carmichael, 1st Lord Carmichael | 1647 | 1672 | |
| Lord Duffus (1650) | Alexander Sutherland, 1st Lord Duffus | 1650 | 1674 | |
| Lord Rollo (1651) | James Rollo, 2nd Lord Rollo | 1659 | 1669 | Died |
| Lord Rollo (1651) | Andrew Rollo, 3rd Lord Rollo | 1669 | 1700 | |
| Lord Ruthven of Freeland (1650) | Thomas Ruthven, 1st Lord Ruthven of Freeland | 1651 | 1673 | |
| Lord Rutherfurd (1661) | Andrew Rutherfurd, 1st Lord Rutherfurd | 1661 | 1664 | New creation, died |
| Lord Rutherfurd (1661) | Thomas Rutherfurd, 2nd Lord Rutherfurd | 1664 | 1668 | Died |
| Lord Rutherfurd (1661) | Archibald Rutherfurd, 3rd Lord Rutherfurd | 1668 | 1685 | |
| Lord Bellenden (1661) | William Bellenden, 1st Lord Bellenden | 1661 | 1671 | New creation |
| Lord Newark (1661) | David Leslie, 1st Lord Newark | 1661 | 1682 | New creation |

== Peerage of Ireland ==
| Title | Holder | Date gained | Date lost | Notes |
|---|---|---|---|---|
| Duke of Ormonde (1661) | James Butler, 1st Duke of Ormonde | 1661 | 1688 | New creation |
| Marquess of Ormonde (1642) | James Butler, 1st Duke of Ormonde | 1642 | 1688 | Created Duke of Ormonde, see above |
| Marquess of Antrim (1645) | Randal MacDonnell, 1st Marquess of Antrim | 1645 | 1683 | |
| Earl of Kildare (1316) | George FitzGerald, 16th Earl of Kildare | 1620 | 1660 | Died |
| Earl of Kildare (1316) | Wentworth FitzGerald, 17th Earl of Kildare | 1660 | 1664 | Died |
| Earl of Kildare (1316) | John FitzGerald, 18th Earl of Kildare | 1664 | 1707 | |
| Earl of Waterford (1446) | Francis Talbot, 11th Earl of Waterford | 1654 | 1667 | |
| Earl of Waterford (1446) | Charles Talbot, 12th Earl of Waterford | 1667 | 1718 | |
| Earl of Clanricarde (1543) | Richard Burke, 6th Earl of Clanricarde | 1657 | 1666 | Died |
| Earl of Clanricarde (1543) | William Burke, 7th Earl of Clanricarde | 1666 | 1687 | |
| Earl of Thomond (1543) | Henry O'Brien, 7th Earl of Thomond | 1657 | 1691 | |
| Earl of Castlehaven (1616) | James Tuchet, 3rd Earl of Castlehaven | 1630 | 1684 | |
| Earl of Cork (1620) | Richard Boyle, 2nd Earl of Cork | 1643 | 1698 | |
| Earl of Westmeath (1621) | Richard Nugent, 2nd Earl of Westmeath | 1642 | 1684 | |
| Earl of Roscommon (1622) | Wentworth Dillon, 4th Earl of Roscommon | 1649 | 1685 | |
| Earl of Londonderry (1622) | Weston Ridgeway, 3rd Earl of Londonderry | 1641 | 1672 | |
| Earl of Meath (1627) | Edward Brabazon, 2nd Earl of Meath | 1651 | 1675 | |
| Earl of Barrymore (1628) | Richard Barry, 2nd Earl of Barrymore | 1642 | 1694 | |
| Earl of Carbery (1628) | Richard Vaughan, 2nd Earl of Carbery | 1634 | 1687 | |
| Earl of Fingall (1628) | Luke Plunkett, 3rd Earl of Fingall | 1649 | 1684 | |
| Earl of Downe (1628) | Thomas Pope, 2nd Earl of Downe | 1640 | 1660 | Died |
| Earl of Downe (1628) | Thomas Pope, 3rd Earl of Downe | 1660 | 1668 | Died |
| Earl of Downe (1628) | Thomas Pope, 4th Earl of Downe | 1668 | 1668 | Died, title extinct |
| Earl of Desmond (1628) | George Feilding, 1st Earl of Desmond | 1628 | 1665 | Died |
| Earl of Desmond (1628) | William Feilding, 2nd Earl of Desmond | 1665 | 1685 | |
| Earl of Ardglass (1645) | Wingfield Cromwell, 2nd Earl of Ardglass | 1653 | 1668 | Died |
| Earl of Ardglass (1645) | Thomas Cromwell, 3rd Earl of Ardglass | 1668 | 1682 | |
| Earl of Donegall (1647) | Arthur Chichester, 1st Earl of Donegall | 1647 | 1675 | |
| Earl of Cavan (1647) | Charles Lambart, 1st Earl of Cavan | 1647 | 1660 | Died |
| Earl of Cavan (1647) | Richard Lambart, 2nd Earl of Cavan | 1660 | 1690 | |
| Earl of Clanbrassil (1647) | Henry Hamilton, 2nd Earl of Clanbrassil | 1659 | 1675 | |
| Earl of Inchiquin (1654) | Murrough O'Brien, 1st Earl of Inchiquin | 1654 | 1674 | |
| Earl of Clancarty (1658) | Donough MacCarty, 1st Earl of Clancarty | 1658 | 1665 | Died |
| Earl of Clancarty (1658) | Charles MacCarty, 2nd Earl of Clancarty | 1665 | 1666 | Died |
| Earl of Clancarty (1658) | Callaghan MacCarty, 3rd Earl of Clancarty | 1666 | 1676 | |
| Earl of Orrery (1660) | Roger Boyle, 1st Earl of Orrery | 1660 | 1679 | New creation |
| Earl of Mountrath (1660) | Charles Coote, 1st Earl of Mountrath | 1660 | 1661 | New creation; died |
| Earl of Mountrath (1660) | Charles Coote, 2nd Earl of Mountrath | 1661 | 1672 | |
| Earl of Tyrconnell (1661) | Oliver FitzWilliam, 1st Earl of Tyrconnell | 1661 | 1667 | New creation; died, title extinct |
| Earl of Drogheda (1661) | Henry Moore, 1st Earl of Drogheda | 1661 | 1675 | New creation |
| Earl of Carlingford (1661) | Theobald Taaffe 1st Earl of Carlingford | 1661 | 1677 | New creation |
| Earl of Mount Alexander (1661) | Hugh Montgomery, 1st Earl of Mount Alexander | 1661 | 1663 | New creation; died |
| Earl of Mount Alexander (1661) | Hugh Montgomery, 2nd Earl of Mount Alexander | 1663 | 1717 | |
| Earl of Castlemaine (1661) | Roger Palmer, 1st Earl of Castlemaine | 1661 | 1705 | New creation |
| Earl of Arran (1662) | Richard Butler, 1st Earl of Arran | 1662 | 1686 | New creation |
| Viscount Gormanston (1478) | Jenico Preston, 7th Viscount Gormanston | 1643 | 1691 | |
| Viscount Mountgarret (1550) | Edmund Butler, 4th Viscount Mountgarret | 1651 | 1679 | |
| Viscount Grandison (1621) | John Villiers, 3rd Viscount Grandison | 1643 | 1661 | Died |
| Viscount Grandison (1621) | George Villiers, 4th Viscount Grandison | 1661 | 1699 | |
| Viscount Wilmot (1621) | Henry Wilmot, 3rd Viscount Wilmot | 1658 | 1680 | |
| Viscount Valentia (1622) | Francis Annesley, 1st Viscount Valentia | 1642 | 1660 | Died |
| Viscount Valentia (1622) | Arthur Annesley, 2nd Viscount Valentia | 1660 | 1686 | Created Earl of Anglesey in the Peerage of England |
| Viscount Moore (1621) | Henry Moore, 3rd Viscount Moore | 1643 | 1675 | Created Earl of Drogheda, see above |
| Viscount Dillon (1622) | Thomas Dillon, 4th Viscount Dillon | 1630 | 1672 | |
| Viscount Loftus (1622) | Edward Loftus, 2nd Viscount Loftus | 1643 | 1680 | |
| Viscount Beaumont of Swords (1622) | Thomas Beaumont, 3rd Viscount Beaumont of Swords | 1658 | 1702 | |
| Viscount Netterville (1622) | Nicholas Netterville, 3rd Viscount Netterville | 1659 | 1689 | |
| Viscount Montgomery (1622) | Hugh Montgomery, 3rd Viscount Montgomery | 1642 | 1663 | Created Earl of Mount Alexander, see above |
| Viscount Magennis (1623) | Arthur Magennis, 3rd Viscount Magennis | 1639 | 1683 | |
| Viscount Kilmorey (1625) | Charles Needham, 4th Viscount Kilmorey | 1657 | 1660 | Died |
| Viscount Kilmorey (1625) | Robert Needham, 5th Viscount Kilmorey | 1660 | 1668 | Died |
| Viscount Kilmorey (1625) | Thomas Needham, 6th Viscount Kilmorey | 1668 | 1687 | |
| Viscount Baltinglass (1627) | Thomas Roper, 2nd Viscount Baltinglass | 1637 | 1670 | |
| Viscount Castleton (1627) | George Saunderson, 5th Viscount Castleton | 1650 | 1714 | |
| Viscount Killultagh (1627) | Edward Conway, 3rd Viscount Killultagh | 1655 | 1683 | |
| Viscount Mayo (1627) | Theobald Bourke, 4th Viscount Mayo | 1652 | 1676 | |
| Viscount Sarsfield (1627) | David Sarsfield, 3rd Viscount Sarsfield | 1648 | 1687 | |
| Viscount Chaworth (1628) | Patrick Chaworth, 3rd Viscount Chaworth | 1644 | 1693 | |
| Viscount Savile (1628) | James Savile, 2nd Viscount Savile | 1659 | 1671 | |
| Viscount Lumley (1628) | Richard Lumley, 1st Viscount Lumley | 1628 | 1663 | Died |
| Viscount Lumley (1628) | Richard Lumley, 2nd Viscount Lumley | 1663 | 1721 | |
| Viscount Taaffe (1628) | Theobald Taaffe, 2nd Viscount Taaffe | 1642 | 1677 | Created Earl of Carlingford, see above |
| Viscount Molyneux (1628) | Caryll Molyneux, 3rd Viscount Molyneux | 1654 | 1699 | |
| Viscount Monson (1628) | William Monson, 1st Viscount Monson | 1628 | 1660 | Degraded by Parliament |
| Viscount Strangford (1628) | Philip Smythe, 2nd Viscount Strangford | 1635 | 1708 | |
| Viscount Scudamore (1628) | John Scudamore, 1st Viscount Scudamore | 1628 | 1671 | |
| Viscount Wenman (1628) | Thomas Wenman, 2nd Viscount Wenman | 1640 | 1665 | Died |
| Viscount Wenman (1628) | Philip Wenman, 3rd Viscount Wenman | 1665 | 1686 | |
| Viscount Ranelagh (1628) | Arthur Jones, 2nd Viscount Ranelagh | 1643 | 1669 | Died |
| Viscount Ranelagh (1628) | Richard Jones, 3rd Viscount Ranelagh | 1669 | 1711 | |
| Viscount FitzWilliam (1629) | Oliver FitzWilliam, 2nd Viscount Fitzwilliam | 1650 | 1667 | Died |
| Viscount FitzWilliam (1629) | William FitzWilliam, 3rd Viscount FitzWilliam | 1667 | 1670 | |
| Viscount Fairfax of Emley (1629) | Charles Fairfax, 5th Viscount Fairfax of Emley | 1651 | 1711 | |
| Viscount Ikerrin (1629) | Pierce Butler, 1st Viscount Ikerrin | 1629 | 1674 | |
| Viscount Clanmalier (1631) | Lewis O'Dempsey, 2nd Viscount Clanmalier | 1638 | 1683 | |
| Viscount Cullen (1642) | Charles Cokayne, 1st Viscount Cullen | 1642 | 1661 | Died |
| Viscount Cullen (1642) | Brien Cokayne, 2nd Viscount Cullen | 1661 | 1687 | |
| Viscount Carrington (1643) | Charles Smyth, 1st Viscount Carrington | 1643 | 1665 | Died |
| Viscount Carrington (1643) | Francis Smith, 2nd Viscount Carrington | 1665 | 1701 | |
| Viscount Tracy (1643) | Robert Tracy, 2nd Viscount Tracy | 1648 | 1662 | Died |
| Viscount Tracy (1643) | John Tracy, 3rd Viscount Tracy | 1662 | 1687 | |
| Viscount Bulkeley (1644) | Robert Bulkeley, 2nd Viscount Bulkeley | 1659 | 1688 | |
| Viscount Bellomont (1645) | Charles Rupert Bard, 2nd Viscount Bellomont | 1656 | 1667 | Died, title extinct |
| Viscount Brouncker (1645) | William Brouncker, 2nd Viscount Brouncker | 1645 | 1684 | |
| Viscount Ogle (1645) | William Ogle, 1st Viscount Ogle | 1645 | 1682 | |
| Viscount Barnewall (1646) | Nicholas Barnewall, 1st Viscount Barnewall | 1646 | 1663 | Died |
| Viscount Barnewall (1646) | Henry Barnewall, 2nd Viscount Barnewall | 1663 | 1688 | |
| Viscount Galmoye (1646) | Edward Butler, 2nd Viscount of Galmoye | 1653 | 1667 | Died |
| Viscount Galmoye (1646) | Piers Butler, 3rd Viscount of Galmoye | 1667 | 1697 | |
| Viscount Tara (1650) | Thomas Preston, 3rd Viscount Tara | 1659 | 1674 | |
| Viscount Massereene (1660) | John Clotworthy, 1st Viscount Massereene | 1660 | 1665 | New creation; died |
| Viscount Massereene (1660) | John Skeffington, 2nd Viscount Massereene | 1665 | 1695 | |
| Viscount Shannon (1660) | Francis Boyle, 1st Viscount Shannon | 1660 | 1699 | New creation |
| Viscount Fanshawe (1661) | Thomas Fanshawe, 1st Viscount Fanshawe | 1661 | 1665 | New creation; died |
| Viscount Fanshawe (1661) | Thomas Fanshawe, 2nd Viscount Fanshawe | 1665 | 1674 | |
| Viscount Cholmondeley (1661) | Robert Cholmondeley, 1st Viscount Cholmondeley | 1661 | 1681 | New creation |
| Viscount Dungan (1662) | William Dongan, 1st Viscount Dungan | 1662 | 1698 | New creation |
| Viscount Dungannon (1662) | Marcus Trevor, 1st Viscount Dungannon | 1662 | 1670 | New creation |
| Viscount Clare (1662) | Daniel O'Brien, 1st Viscount Clare | 1662 | 1666 | New creation; died |
| Viscount Clare (1662) | Connor O'Brien, 2nd Viscount Clare | 1666 | 1670 | |
| Viscount Fitzhardinge (1663) | Charles Berkeley, 1st Viscount Fitzhardinge | 1663 | 1665 | New creation; died |
| Viscount Fitzhardinge (1663) | Charles Berkeley, 2nd Viscount Fitzhardinge | 1665 | 1668 | Died |
| Viscount Fitzhardinge (1663) | Maurice Berkeley, 3rd Viscount Fitzhardinge | 1668 | 1690 | |
| Viscount Charlemont (1665) | William Caulfeild, 1st Viscount Charlemont | 1665 | 1671 | New creation |
| Viscount Powerscourt (1665) | Folliott Wingfield, 1st Viscount Powerscourt | 1665 | 1717 | New creation |
| Baron Athenry (1172) | Francis de Bermingham, 12th Baron Athenry | 1645 | 1677 | |
| Baron Kingsale (1223) | Patrick de Courcy, 20th Baron Kingsale | 1642 | 1663 | Died |
| Baron Kingsale (1223) | John de Courcy, 21st Baron Kingsale | 1663 | 1667 | Died |
| Baron Kingsale (1223) | Patrick de Courcy, 22nd Baron Kingsale | 1667 | 1669 | Died |
| Baron Kingsale (1223) | Almericus de Courcy, 23rd Baron Kingsale | 1669 | 1720 | |
| Baron Kerry (1223) | Patrick Fitzmaurice, 19th Baron Kerry | 1630 | 1661 | Died |
| Baron Kerry (1223) | William Fitzmaurice, 20th Baron Kerry | 1661 | 1697 | |
| Baron Slane (1370) | Charles Fleming, 15th Baron Slane | 1641 | 1661 | Died |
| Baron Slane (1370) | Randall Fleming, 16th Baron Slane | 1661 | 1676 | |
| Baron Howth (1425) | William St Lawrence, 12th Baron Howth | 1643 | 1671 | |
| Baron Trimlestown (1461) | Matthias Barnewall, 8th Baron Trimlestown | 1639 | 1667 | Died |
| Baron Trimlestown (1461) | Robert Barnewall, 9th Baron Trimlestown | 1667 | 1689 | |
| Baron Dunsany (1462) | Patrick Plunkett, 9th Baron of Dunsany | 1603 | 1668 | Died |
| Baron Dunsany (1462) | Christopher Plunkett, 10th Baron of Dunsany | 1668 | 1690 | |
| Baron Power (1535) | John Power, 5th Baron Power | 1607 | 1661 | Died |
| Baron Power (1535) | Richard Power, 6th Baron Power | 1661 | 1690 | |
| Baron Dunboyne (1541) | James Butler, 4th/14th Baron Dunboyne | 1640 | 1662 | Died |
| Baron Dunboyne (1541) | Pierce Butler, 5th/15th Baron Dunboyne | 1662 | 1690 | |
| Baron Louth (1541) | Oliver Plunkett, 6th Baron Louth | 1629 | 1679 | |
| Baron Upper Ossory (1541) | Barnaby Fitzpatrick, 6th Baron Upper Ossory | 1638 | 1666 | Died |
| Baron Upper Ossory (1541) | Barnaby Fitzpatrick, 7th Baron Upper Ossory | 1666 | 1691 | |
| Baron Bourke of Castleconnell (1580) | William Bourke, 6th Baron Bourke of Connell | 1635 | 1665 | Died |
| Baron Bourke of Castleconnell (1580) | Thomas Bourke, 7th Baron Bourke of Connell | 1665 | 1680 | |
| Baron Cahir (1583) | Pierce Butler, 4th Baron Cahir | 1648 | 1676 | |
| Baron Hamilton (1617) | George Hamilton, 4th Baron Hamilton of Strabane | 1655 | 1668 | Died |
| Baron Hamilton (1617) | Claud Hamilton, 5th Baron Hamilton of Strabane | 1668 | 1691 | |
| Baron Bourke of Brittas (1618) | John Bourke, 2nd Baron Bourke of Brittas | 1654 | 1668 | Died |
| Baron Bourke of Brittas (1618) | Theobald Bourke, 3rd Baron Bourke of Brittas | 1668 | 1691 | |
| Baron Mountjoy (1618) | Mountjoy Blount, 1st Baron Mountjoy | 1618 | 1665 | Died |
| Baron Mountjoy (1618) | Mountjoy Blount, 2nd Baron Mountjoy | 1665 | 1675 | |
| Baron Castle Stewart (1619) | Josias Stewart, 4th Baron Castle Stewart | 1650 | 1662 | Died |
| Baron Castle Stewart (1619) | John Stewart, 5th Baron Castle Stewart | 1662 | 1685 | |
| Baron Folliot (1620) | Thomas Folliott, 2nd Baron Folliott | 1622 | 1697 | |
| Baron Maynard (1620) | William Maynard, 2nd Baron Maynard | 1640 | 1699 | |
| Baron Gorges of Dundalk (1620) | Richard Gorges, 2nd Baron Gorges of Dundalk | 1650 | 1712 | |
| Baron Digby (1620) | Kildare Digby, 2nd Baron Digby | 1642 | 1661 | Died |
| Baron Digby (1620) | Robert Digby, 3rd Baron Digby | 1661 | 1677 | |
| Baron Fitzwilliam (1620) | William Fitzwilliam, 3rd Baron Fitzwilliam | 1658 | 1719 | |
| Baron Caulfeild (1620) | William Caulfeild, 5th Baron Caulfield | 1642 | 1671 | Created Viscount Charlemont, see above |
| Baron Aungier (1621) | Francis Aungier, 3rd Baron Aungier of Longford | 1655 | 1700 | |
| Baron Blayney (1621) | Edward Blayney, 3rd Baron Blayney | 1646 | 1669 | Died |
| Baron Blayney (1621) | Richard Blayney, 4th Baron Blayney | 1669 | 1670 | |
| Baron Brereton (1624) | William Brereton, 2nd Baron Brereton | 1631 | 1664 | Died |
| Baron Brereton (1624) | William Brereton, 3rd Baron Brereton | 1664 | 1680 | |
| Baron Herbert of Castle Island (1624) | Edward Herbert, 3rd Baron Herbert of Castle Island | 1655 | 1678 | |
| Baron Baltimore (1625) | Cecilius Calvert, 2nd Baron Baltimore | 1632 | 1675 | |
| Baron Coleraine (1625) | Hugh Hare, 1st Baron Coleraine | 1625 | 1667 | Died |
| Baron Coleraine (1625) | Henry Hare, 2nd Baron Coleraine | 1667 | 1708 | |
| Baron Sherard (1627) | Bennet Sherard, 2nd Baron Sherard | 1640 | 1700 | |
| Baron Boyle of Broghill (1628) | Roger Boyle, 1st Baron Boyle of Broghill | 1628 | 1679 | Created Earl of Orrery, see above |
| Baron Alington (1642) | William Alington, 3rd Baron Alington | 1659 | 1685 | |
| Baron Hawley (1646) | Francis Hawley, 1st Baron Hawley | 1646 | 1684 | |
| Baron Kingston (1660) | John King, 1st Baron Kingston | 1660 | 1676 | New creation |
| Baron Coote (1660) | Richard Coote, 1st Baron Coote | 1660 | 1683 | New creation |
| Baron Barry of Santry (1661) | James Barry, 1st Baron Barry of Santry | 1661 | 1673 | New creation |
| Baron Hamilton of Glenawly (1661) | Hugh Hamilton, 1st Baron Hamilton of Glenawly | 1661 | 1679 | New creation |

| Preceded by List of peers 1650–1659 | Lists of peers by decade 1660–1669 | Succeeded by List of peers 1670–1679 |
