= List of peers 1650–1659 =

This page lists all peers who held extant titles between 1650 and 1659.

== Peerage of England ==
Title	Holder	Date gained	Date lost	Notes
Duke of Cornwall (1337)	none	1649	1688	
Duke of Buckingham (1623)	George Villiers, 2nd Duke of Buckingham	1628	1687	
Duke of Richmond (1641)	James Stewart, 1st Duke of Richmond	1641	1655	Died
Duke of Richmond (1641)	Esmé Stewart, 2nd Duke of Richmond	1655	1660	
Duke of Cumberland (1644)	Prince Rupert of the Rhine	1644	1682	
Duke of York (1644)	James Stuart	1644	1685	
Duke of Gloucester (1659)	Henry Stuart, Duke of Gloucester	1659	1660	New creation
Marquess of Winchester (1551)	John Paulet, 5th Marquess of Winchester	1628	1675	
Marquess of Hertford (1641)	William Seymour, 1st Marquess of Hertford	1641	1660	
Marquess of Worcester (1642)	Edward Somerset, 2nd Marquess of Worcester	1646	1667	
Marquess of Newcastle-upon-Tyne (1643)	William Cavendish, 1st Marquess of Newcastle-upon-Tyne	1643	1676	
Marquess of Dorchester (1645)	Henry Pierrepont, 1st Marquess of Dorchester	1645	1680	
Earl of Arundel (1138)	Henry Howard, 22nd Earl of Arundel	1646	1652	Died
Earl of Arundel (1138)	Thomas Howard, 23rd Earl of Arundel	1652	1677	
Earl of Oxford (1142)	Aubrey de Vere, 20th Earl of Oxford	1632	1703	
Earl of Shrewsbury (1442)	John Talbot, 10th Earl of Shrewsbury	1630	1654	Died
Earl of Shrewsbury (1442)	Francis Talbot, 11th Earl of Shrewsbury	1654	1668	
Earl of Kent (1465)	Henry Grey, 10th Earl of Kent	1643	1651	Died
Earl of Kent (1465)	Anthony Grey, 11th Earl of Kent	1651	1702	
Earl of Derby (1485)	James Stanley, 7th Earl of Derby	1642	1651	Died
Earl of Derby (1485)	Charles Stanley, 8th Earl of Derby	1651	1672	
Earl of Rutland (1525)	John Manners, 8th Earl of Rutland	1641	1679	
Earl of Huntingdon (1529)	Ferdinando Hastings, 6th Earl of Huntingdon	1643	1656	Died
Earl of Huntingdon (1529)	Theophilus Hastings, 7th Earl of Huntingdon	1656	1701	
Earl of Bath (1536)	Henry Bourchier, 5th Earl of Bath	1636	1654	Died, title extinct
Earl of Southampton (1547)	Thomas Wriothesley, 4th Earl of Southampton	1624	1667	Succeeded as 2nd Earl of Chichester
Earl of Bedford (1550)	William Russell, 5th Earl of Bedford	1641	1700	
Earl of Pembroke (1551)	Philip Herbert, 5th Earl of Pembroke	1649	1669	
Earl of Devon (1553)	William Courtenay, de jure 5th Earl of Devon	1638	1702	
Earl of Northumberland (1557)	Algernon Percy, 10th Earl of Northumberland	1632	1668	
Earl of Lincoln (1572)	Theophilus Clinton, 4th Earl of Lincoln	1619	1667	
Earl of Nottingham (1596)	Charles Howard, 3rd Earl of Nottingham	1642	1681	
Earl of Suffolk (1603)	James Howard, 3rd Earl of Suffolk	1640	1689	
Earl of Dorset (1604)	Edward Sackville, 4th Earl of Dorset	1624	1652	Died
Earl of Dorset (1604)	Richard Sackville, 5th Earl of Dorset	1652	1677	
Earl of Exeter (1605)	David Cecil, 3rd Earl of Exeter	1643	1678	
Earl of Salisbury (1605)	William Cecil, 2nd Earl of Salisbury	1612	1668	
Earl of Bridgewater (1617)	John Egerton, 2nd Earl of Bridgewater	1649	1686	
Earl of Northampton (1618)	James Compton, 3rd Earl of Northampton	1643	1681	
Earl of Leicester (1618)	Robert Sidney, 2nd Earl of Leicester	1626	1677	
Earl of Warwick (1618)	Robert Rich, 2nd Earl of Warwick	1618	1658	Died
Earl of Warwick (1618)	Robert Rich, 3rd Earl of Warwick	1658	1659	Died
Earl of Warwick (1618)	Charles Rich, 4th Earl of Warwick	1659	1673	
Earl of Devonshire (1618)	William Cavendish, 3rd Earl of Devonshire	1628	1684	
Earl of Cambridge (1619)	William Hamilton, 3rd Earl of Cambridge	1649	1651	Duke of Hamilton in the Peerage of Scotland; died, Earldom extinct
Earl of Carlisle (1622)	James Hay, 2nd Earl of Carlisle	1636	1660	
Earl of Denbigh (1622)	Basil Feilding, 2nd Earl of Denbigh	1643	1675	
Earl of Bristol (1622)	John Digby, 1st Earl of Bristol	1622	1653	Died
Earl of Bristol (1622)	George Digby, 2nd Earl of Bristol	1653	1677	
Earl of Middlesex (1622)	James Cranfield, 2nd Earl of Middlesex	1645	1651	Died
Earl of Middlesex (1622)	Lionel Cranfield, 3rd Earl of Middlesex	1651	1674	
Earl of Anglesey (1623)	Charles Villiers, 2nd Earl of Anglesey	1630	1661	
Earl of Holland (1624)	Robert Rich, 2nd Earl of Holland	1649	1675	
Earl of Clare (1624)	John Holles, 2nd Earl of Clare	1637	1666	
Earl of Bolingbroke (1624)	Oliver St John, 2nd Earl of Bolingbroke	1646	1688	
Earl of Westmorland (1624)	Mildmay Fane, 2nd Earl of Westmorland	1629	1666	
Earl of Cleveland (1626)	Thomas Wentworth, 1st Earl of Cleveland	1626	1667	
Earl of Manchester (1626)	Edward Montagu, 2nd Earl of Manchester	1642	1671	
Earl of Marlborough (1626)	James Ley, 3rd Earl of Marlborough	1638	1665	
Earl of Mulgrave (1626)	Edmund Sheffield, 2nd Earl of Mulgrave	1646	1658	Died
Earl of Mulgrave (1626)	John Sheffield, 3rd Earl of Mulgrave	1658	1721	
Earl of Berkshire (1626)	Thomas Howard, 1st Earl of Berkshire	1626	1669	
Earl of Monmouth (1626)	Henry Carey, 2nd Earl of Monmouth	1639	1661	
Earl Rivers (1626)	John Savage, 2nd Earl Rivers	1640	1654	Died
Earl Rivers (1626)	Thomas Savage, 3rd Earl Rivers	1654	1694	
Earl of Lindsey (1626)	Montagu Bertie, 2nd Earl of Lindsey	1642	1666	
Earl of Dover (1628)	Henry Carey, 1st Earl of Dover	1628	1666	
Earl of Peterborough (1628)	Henry Mordaunt, 2nd Earl of Peterborough	1643	1697	
Earl of Stamford (1628)	Henry Grey, 1st Earl of Stamford	1628	1673	
Earl of Winchilsea (1628)	Heneage Finch, 3rd Earl of Winchilsea	1639	1689	
Earl of Carnarvon (1628)	Charles Dormer, 2nd Earl of Carnarvon	1643	1709	
Earl of Newport (1628)	Mountjoy Blount, 1st Earl of Newport	1628	1666	
Earl of Chesterfield (1628)	Philip Stanhope, 1st Earl of Chesterfield	1628	1656	Died
Earl of Chesterfield (1628)	Philip Stanhope, 2nd Earl of Chesterfield	1656	1714	
Earl of Thanet (1628)	John Tufton, 2nd Earl of Thanet	1632	1664	
Earl of St Albans (1628)	Ulick Burke, 2nd Earl of St Albans	1635	1657	Earldom extinct; Irish titles succeeded by a cousin
Earl of Portland (1633)	Jerome Weston, 2nd Earl of Portland	1635	1663	
Earl of Strafford (1640)	none	1641	1662	Attainted
Earl Rivers (1641)	Elizabeth Savage, Countess Rivers	1641	1651	Died, title extinct
Earl of Strafford (1641)	William Wentworth, 1st Earl of Strafford	1641	1695	
Earl of Sunderland (1643)	Robert Spencer, 2nd Earl of Sunderland	1643	1702	
Earl of Sussex (1644)	Thomas Savile, 1st Earl of Sussex	1644	1659	Died
Earl of Sussex (1644)	James Savile, 2nd Earl of Sussex	1659	1671	
Earl of Brentford (1644)	Patrick Ruthven, 1st Earl of Brentford	1644	1651	Died, title extinct
Earl of Chichester (1644)	Francis Leigh, 1st Earl of Chichester	1644	1653	Succeeded by the 4th Earl of Southampton, see above
Earl of Norwich (1644)	George Goring, 1st Earl of Norwich	1644	1663	
Earl of Scarsdale (1645)	Francis Leke, 1st Earl of Scarsdale	1645	1655	Died
Earl of Scarsdale (1645)	Nicholas Leke, 2nd Earl of Scarsdale	1655	1681	
Earl of Lichfield (1645)	Charles Stewart, 1st Earl of Lichfield	1645	1672	
Earl of Rochester (1652)	Henry Wilmot, 1st Earl of Rochester	1652	1658	New creation; died
Earl of Rochester (1652)	John Wilmot, 2nd Earl of Rochester	1658	1680	
Viscount Hereford (1550)	Walter Devereux, 5th Viscount Hereford	1646	1658	Died
Viscount Hereford (1550)	Leicester Devereux, 6th Viscount Hereford	1658	1676	
Viscount Montagu (1554)	Francis Browne, 3rd Viscount Montagu	1629	1682	
Viscount Purbeck (1618)	John Villiers, 1st Viscount Purbeck	1619	1657	Died, title extinct
Viscount Saye and Sele (1624)	William Fiennes, 1st Viscount Saye and Sele	1624	1662	
Viscount Conway (1627)	Edward Conway, 2nd Viscount Conway	1631	1655	Died
Viscount Conway (1627)	Edward Conway, 3rd Viscount Conway	1655	1683	
Viscount Campden (1628)	Baptist Noel, 3rd Viscount Campden	1643	1682	
Viscount Stafford (1640)	William Howard, 1st Viscount Stafford	1640	1680	
Viscount Fauconberg (1643)	Thomas Belasyse, 1st Viscount Fauconberg	1643	1653	Died
Viscount Fauconberg (1643)	Thomas Belasyse, 1st Earl Fauconberg	1652	1700	
Viscount Mordaunt (1659)	John Mordaunt, 1st Viscount Mordaunt	1659	1675	New creation
Baron de Clifford (1299)	Anne Clifford, 14th Baroness de Clifford	1605	1676	
Baron Furnivall (1299)	Alethea Howard, 13th Baron Furnivall	1651	1654	Abeyance terminated; died, Barony succeeded by the Duke of Norfolk, and held by his heirs until 1777, when it fell into abeyance
Baron Morley (1299)	Henry Parker, 14th Baron Morley	1622	1655	Died
Baron Morley (1299)	Thomas Parker, 15th Baron Morley	1655	1697	
Baron Dacre (1321)	Francis Lennard, 14th Baron Dacre	1630	1662	
Baron Grey of Ruthyn (1325)	Susan Longueville, 13th Baroness Grey de Ruthyn	1643	1676	
Baron Darcy de Knayth (1332)	Conyers Darcy, 7th Baron Darcy de Knayth	1641	1653	Died
Baron Darcy de Knayth (1332)	Conyers Darcy, 8th Baron Darcy de Knayth	1653	1689	
Baron Berkeley (1421)	George Berkeley, 8th Baron Berkeley	1613	1658	Died
Baron Berkeley (1421)	George Berkeley, 9th Baron Berkeley	1658	1698	
Baron Dudley (1440)	Frances Ward, 6th Baroness Dudley	1643	1697	
Baron Stourton (1448)	William Stourton, 11th Baron Stourton	1633	1672	
Baron Willoughby de Broke (1491)	Greville Verney, 9th Baron Willoughby de Broke	1648	1668	
Baron Monteagle (1514)	Henry Parker, 5th Baron Monteagle	1622	1655	Died
Baron Monteagle (1514)	Thomas Parker, 6th Baron Monteagle	1655	1697	
Baron Vaux of Harrowden (1523)	Edward Vaux, 4th Baron Vaux of Harrowden	1595	1661	
Baron Sandys of the Vine (1529)	William Sandys, 6th Baron Sandys	1645	1668	
Baron Eure (1544)	William Eure, 5th Baron Eure	1646	1652	Died
Baron Eure (1544)	George Eure, 6th Baron Eure	1652	1672	
Baron Wharton (1545)	Philip Wharton, 4th Baron Wharton	1625	1695	
Baron Willoughby of Parham (1547)	Francis Willoughby, 5th Baron Willoughby of Parham	1618	1666	
Baron Paget (1552)	William Paget, 5th Baron Paget	1629	1678	
Baron North (1554)	Dudley North, 3rd Baron North	1600	1666	
Baron Chandos (1554)	George Brydges, 6th Baron Chandos	1621	1655	Died
Baron Chandos (1554)	William Brydges, 7th Baron Chandos	1655	1676	
Baron De La Warr (1570)	Charles West, 5th Baron De La Warr	1628	1687	
Baron Norreys (1572)	Bridget Bertie, 4th Baroness Norreys	1645	1657	Died
Baron Norreys (1572)	James Bertie, 5th Baron Norreys	1657	1699	
Baron Gerard (1603)	Charles Gerard, 4th Baron Gerard	1640	1667	
Baron Petre (1603)	William Petre, 4th Baron Petre	1638	1684	
Baron Arundell of Wardour (1605)	Henry Arundell, 3rd Baron Arundell of Wardour	1643	1694	
Baron Stanhope of Harrington (1605)	Charles Stanhope, 2nd Baron Stanhope	1621	1675	
Baron Teynham (1616)	John Roper, 3rd Baron Teynham	1628	1673	
Baron Brooke (1621)	Francis Greville, 3rd Baron Brooke	1643	1658	Died
Baron Brooke (1621)	Robert Greville, 4th Baron Brooke	1658	1677	
Baron Montagu of Boughton (1621)	Edward Montagu, 2nd Baron Montagu of Boughton	1644	1684	
Baron Grey of Warke (1624)	William Grey, 1st Baron Grey of Werke	1624	1674	
Baron Robartes (1625)	John Robartes, 2nd Baron Robartes	1625	1685	
Baron Craven (1627)	Willian Craven, 1st Baron Craven	1627	1697	
Baron Lovelace (1627)	John Lovelace, 2nd Baron Lovelace	1634	1670	
Baron Poulett (1627)	John Poulett, 2nd Baron Poulett	1649	1665	
Baron Clifford (1628)	Elizabeth Boyle, Baroness Clifford	1643	1691	
Baron Brudenell (1628)	Thomas Brudenell, 1st Baron Brudenell	1628	1663	
Baron Maynard (1628)	William Maynard, 2nd Baron Maynard	1640	1699	
Baron Coventry (1628)	Thomas Coventry, 2nd Baron Coventry	1640	1661	
Baron Mohun of Okehampton (1628)	Warwick Mohun, 2nd Baron Mohun of Okehampton	1640	1665	
Baron Boteler of Brantfield (1628)	William Boteler, 2nd Baron Boteler of Brantfield	1637	1657	Died, title extinct
Baron Powis (1629)	William Herbert, 1st Baron Powis	1629	1655	Died
Baron Powis (1629)	Percy Herbert, 2nd Baron Powis	1655	1667	
Baron Herbert of Chirbury (1629)	Richard Herbert, 2nd Baron Herbert of Chirbury	1648	1655	Died
Baron Herbert of Chirbury (1629)	Edward Herbert, 3rd Baron Herbert of Chirbury	1655	1678	
Baron Cottington (1631)	Francis Cottington, 1st Baron Cottington	1631	1652	Died, title extinct
Baron Finch (1640)	John Finch, 1st Baron Finch	1640	1660	
Baron (A)bergavenny (1641)	John Nevill, 1st Baron Bergavenny	1641	1662	
Baron Seymour of Trowbridge (1641)	Francis Seymour, 1st Baron Seymour of Trowbridge	1641	1664	
Baron Capell of Hadham (1641)	Arthur Capell, 2nd Baron Capell of Hadham	1649	1683	
Baron Hatton (1642)	Christopher Hatton, 1st Baron Hatton	1642	1670	
Baron Newport (1642)	Richard Newport, 1st Baron Newport	1642	1651	Died
Baron Newport (1642)	Francis Newport, 2nd Baron Newport	1651	1708	
Baron Percy of Alnwick (1643)	Henry Percy, Baron Percy of Alnwick	1643	1659	Died, title extinct
Baron Leigh (1643)	Thomas Leigh, 1st Baron Leigh	1643	1672	
Baron Hopton (1643)	Ralph Hopton, 1st Baron Hopton	1643	1652	Died, title extinct
Baron Jermyn (1643)	Henry Jermyn, 1st Baron Jermyn	1643	1684	
Baron Byron (1643)	John Byron, 1st Baron Byron	1643	1652	Died
Baron Byron (1643)	Richard Byron, 2nd Baron Byron	1652	1679	
Baron Loughborough (1643)	Henry Hastings, 1st Baron Loughborough	1643	1667	
Baron Widdrington (1643)	William Widdrington, 1st Baron Widdrington	1643	1651	Died
Baron Widdrington (1643)	William Widdrington, 2nd Baron Widdrington	1651	1675	
Baron Ward (1644)	Humble Ward, 1st Baron Ward	1644	1670	
Baron Colepeper (1644)	John Colepeper, 1st Baron Colepeper	1644	1660	
Baron Astley of Reading (1644)	Jacob Astley, 1st Baron Astley of Reading	1644	1652	Died
Baron Astley of Reading (1644)	Isaac Astley, 2nd Baron Astley of Reading	1652	1662	
Baron Cobham (1645)	John Brooke, 1st Baron Cobham	1645	1660	
Baron Lucas of Shenfield (1645)	John Lucas, 1st Baron Lucas of Shenfield	1645	1671	
Baron Belasyse (1645)	John Belasyse, 1st Baron Belasyse	1645	1689	
Baron Rockingham (1645)	Lewis Watson, 1st Baron Rockingham	1645	1653	Died
Baron Rockingham (1645)	Edward Watson, 2nd Baron Rockingham	1653	1689	
Baron Gerard of Brandon (1645)	Charles Gerard, 1st Baron Gerard of Brandon	1645	1694	
Baron Lexinton (1645)	Robert Sutton, 1st Baron Lexinton	1645	1668	
Baron Wotton (1650)	Charles Kirkhoven, 1st Baron Wotton	1650	1683	New creation
Baron Langdale (1658)	Marmaduke Langdale, 1st Baron Langdale	1658	1661	New creation
Baron Crofts (1658)	William Crofts, 1st Baron Crofts	1658	1677	New creation
Baron Berkeley of Stratton (1658)	John Berkeley, 1st Baron Berkeley of Stratton	1658	1678	New creation

== Peerage of Scotland ==
Title	Holder	Date gained	Date lost	Notes
Duke of Rothesay (1398)	none	1649	1688	
Duke of Lennox (1581)	James Stewart, 4th Duke of Lennox	1624	1655	Died
Duke of Lennox (1581)	Esmé Stewart, 5th Duke of Lennox	1655	1660	
Duke of Hamilton (1643)	William Hamilton, 2nd Duke of Hamilton	1649	1651	Died
Duke of Hamilton (1643)	Anne Hamilton, 3rd Duchess of Hamilton	1651	1698	
Marquess of Huntly (1599)	Lewis Gordon, 3rd Marquess of Huntly	1649	1653	Died
Marquess of Huntly (1599)	George Gordon, 4th Marquess of Huntly	1653	1716	
Marquess of Douglas (1633)	William Douglas, 1st Marquess of Douglas	1633	1660	
Marquess of Argyll (1641)	Archibald Campbell, 1st Marquess of Argyll	1641	1661	
Marquess of Montrose (1644)	James Graham, 1st Marquess of Montrose	1644	1650	Died
Marquess of Montrose (1644)	James Graham, 2nd Marquess of Montrose	1650	1669	
Earl of Crawford (1398)	Ludovic Lindsay, 16th Earl of Crawford	1639	1652	Died
Earl of Crawford (1398)	John Lindsay, 17th Earl of Crawford	1652	1678	
Earl of Erroll (1452)	Gilbert Hay, 11th Earl of Erroll	1636	1674	
Earl Marischal (1458)	William Keith, 7th Earl Marischal	1635	1671	
Earl of Sutherland (1235)	John Gordon, 14th Earl of Sutherland	1615	1679	
Earl of Mar (1114)	John Erskine, 19th Earl of Mar	1634	1654	Died
Earl of Mar (1114)	John Erskine, 20th Earl of Mar	1654	1668	
Earl of Rothes (1458)	John Leslie, 7th Earl of Rothes	1641	1681	
Earl of Morton (1458)	William Douglas, 9th Earl of Morton	1649	1681	
Earl of Menteith (1427)	William Graham, 7th Earl of Menteith	1598	1661	
Earl of Glencairn (1488)	William Cunningham, 9th Earl of Glencairn	1631	1664	
Earl of Eglinton (1507)	Alexander Montgomerie, 6th Earl of Eglinton	1612	1661	
Earl of Cassilis (1509)	John Kennedy, 6th Earl of Cassilis	1615	1668	
Earl of Caithness (1455)	George Sinclair, 6th Earl of Caithness	1643	1672	
Earl of Buchan (1469)	James Erskine, 7th Earl of Buchan	1628	1664	
Earl of Moray (1562)	James Stewart, 4th Earl of Moray	1638	1653	Died
Earl of Moray (1562)	Alexander Stuart, 5th Earl of Moray	1653	1701	
Earl of Linlithgow (1600)	Alexander Livingston, 2nd Earl of Linlithgow	1621	1650	Died
Earl of Linlithgow (1600)	George Livingston, 3rd Earl of Linlithgow	1650	1690	
Earl of Winton (1600)	George Seton, 3rd Earl of Winton	1607	1650	Died
Earl of Winton (1600)	George Seton, 4th Earl of Winton	1650	1704	
Earl of Home (1605)	James Home, 3rd Earl of Home	1633	1666	
Earl of Perth (1605)	John Drummond, 2nd Earl of Perth	1611	1662	
Earl of Dunfermline (1605)	Charles Seton, 2nd Earl of Dunfermline	1622	1672	
Earl of Wigtown (1606)	John Fleming, 2nd Earl of Wigtown	1619	1650	Died
Earl of Wigtown (1606)	John Fleming, 3rd Earl of Wigtown	1650	1665	
Earl of Abercorn (1606)	James Hamilton, 2nd Earl of Abercorn	1618	1670	
Earl of Kinghorne (1606)	Patrick Lyon, 3rd Earl of Kinghorne	1646	1695	
Earl of Roxburghe (1616)	Robert Ker, 1st Earl of Roxburghe	1616	1650	Died
Earl of Roxburghe (1616)	William Ker, 2nd Earl of Roxburghe	1650	1675	
Earl of Kellie (1619)	Alexander Erskine, 3rd Earl of Kellie	1643	1677	
Earl of Buccleuch (1619)	Francis Scott, 2nd Earl of Buccleuch	1633	1651	Died
Earl of Buccleuch (1619)	Mary Scott, 3rd Countess of Buccleuch	1651	1661	
Earl of Haddington (1619)	John Hamilton, 4th Earl of Haddington	1645	1669	
Earl of Nithsdale (1620)	Robert Maxwell, 2nd Earl of Nithsdale	1646	1667	
Earl of Galloway (1623)	James Stewart, 2nd Earl of Galloway	1649	1671	
Earl of Seaforth (1623)	George Mackenzie, 2nd Earl of Seaforth	1633	1651	Died
Earl of Seaforth (1623)	Kenneth Mackenzie, 3rd Earl of Seaforth	1651	1678	
Earl of Lauderdale (1624)	John Maitland, 2nd Earl of Lauderdale	1645	1682	
Earl of Annandale (1625)	James Murray, 2nd Earl of Annandale	1640	1658	Died, title extinct
Earl of Tullibardine (1628)	James Murray, 2nd Earl of Tullibardine	1644	1670	
Earl of Atholl (1629)	John Murray, 2nd Earl of Atholl	1642	1703	
Earl of Lothian (1631)	William Kerr, 1st Earl of Lothian	1631	1675	
Earl of Airth (1633)	William Graham, 1st Earl of Airth	1633	1661	
Earl of Loudoun (1633)	John Campbell, 1st Earl of Loudoun	1633	1662	
Earl of Kinnoull (1633)	George Hay, 3rd Earl of Kinnoull	1644	1650	Died
Earl of Kinnoull (1633)	William Hay, 4th Earl of Kinnoull	1650	1677	
Earl of Dumfries (1633)	William Crichton, 2nd Earl of Dumfries	1643	1691	
Earl of Queensberry (1633)	James Douglas, 2nd Earl of Queensberry	1640	1671	
Earl of Stirling (1633)	Henry Alexander, 4th Earl of Stirling	1644	1691	
Earl of Elgin (1633)	Thomas Bruce, 1st Earl of Elgin	1633	1663	
Earl of Southesk (1633)	David Carnegie, 1st Earl of Southesk	1633	1658	Died
Earl of Southesk (1633)	James Carnegie, 2nd Earl of Southesk	1658	1669	
Earl of Traquair (1633)	John Stewart, 1st Earl of Traquair	1633	1659	Died
Earl of Traquair (1633)	John Stewart, 2nd Earl of Traquair	1659	1666	
Earl of Ancram (1633)	Robert Kerr, 1st Earl of Ancram	1633	1654	Died
Earl of Ancram (1633)	Charles Kerr, 2nd Earl of Ancram	1654	1690	
Earl of Wemyss (1633)	David Wemyss, 2nd Earl of Wemyss	1649	1679	
Earl of Dalhousie (1633)	William Ramsay, 1st Earl of Dalhousie	1633	1672	
Earl of Findlater (1638)	James Ogilvy, 1st Earl of Findlater	1638	1653	Died
Earl of Findlater (1638)	Patrick Ogilvy, 2nd Earl of Findlater	1653	1658	Died
Earl of Findlater (1638)	James Ogilvy, 3rd Earl of Findlater	1658	1711	
Earl of Airlie (1639)	James Ogilvy, 1st Earl of Airlie	1639	1665	
Earl of Carnwath (1639)	Robert Dalzell, 1st Earl of Carnwath	1639	1654	Died
Earl of Carnwath (1639)	Gavin Dalzell, 2nd Earl of Carnwath	1654	1674	
Earl of Callendar (1641)	James Livingston, 1st Earl of Callendar	1641	1674	
Earl of Leven (1641)	Alexander Leslie, 1st Earl of Leven	1641	1661	
Earl of Forth (1642)	Patrick Ruthven, 1st Earl of Forth	1642	1651	Died, title extinct
Earl of Hartfell (1643)	William Murray, 1st Earl of Dysart	1643	1655	Died
Earl of Hartfell (1643)	James Johnstone, 2nd Earl of Hartfell	1655	1672	
Earl of Dysart (1643)	Robert Dalzell, 1st Earl of Carnwath	1643	1654	Died
Earl of Dysart (1643)	Elizabeth Tollemache, 2nd Countess of Dysart	1654	1698	
Earl of Dirletoun (1646)	James Maxwell, 1st Earl of Dirletoun	1646	1650	Died, title extinct
Earl of Panmure (1646)	Patrick Maule, 1st Earl of Panmure	1646	1661	
Earl of Selkirk (1646)	William Hamilton, 1st Earl of Selkirk	1646	1694	
Earl of Tweeddale (1646)	John Hay, 1st Earl of Tweeddale	1646	1653	Died
Earl of Tweeddale (1646)	John Hay, 2nd Earl of Tweeddale	1653	1697	
Earl of Northesk (1647)	John Carnegie, 1st Earl of Northesk	1647	1667	
Earl of Kincardine (1647)	Edward Bruce, 1st Earl of Kincardine	1647	1662	
Earl of Balcarres (1651)	Alexander Lindsay, 1st Earl of Balcarres	1651	1659	New creation, died
Earl of Balcarres (1651)	Charles Lindsay, 2nd Earl of Balcarres	1659	1662	
Earl of Ormond (1651)	Archibald Douglas, 1st Earl of Ormond	1651	1655	New creation; the letters patent conferring the titles did not pass the Great Seal and consequently were of no effect
Viscount of Falkland (1620)	Henry Cary, 4th Viscount of Falkland	1649	1663	
Viscount of Dunbar (1620)	John Constable, 2nd Viscount of Dunbar	1645	1668	
Viscount of Stormont (1621)	David Murray, 4th Viscount of Stormont	1658	1668	Title previously held by the Earl of Annandale
Viscount of Kenmure (1633)	Robert Gordon, 4th Viscount of Kenmure	1643	1663	
Viscount of Arbuthnott (1641)	Robert Arbuthnot, 1st Viscount of Arbuthnott	1641	1655	Died
Viscount of Arbuthnott (1641)	Robert Arbuthnot, 2nd Viscount of Arbuthnott	1655	1682	
Viscount of Dudhope (1641)	John Scrymgeour, 3rd Viscount of Dudhope	1644	1668	
Viscount of Frendraught (1642)	James Crichton, 1st Viscount of Frendraught	1642	1650	Died
Viscount of Frendraught (1642)	James Crichton, 2nd Viscount of Frendraught	1650	1678	
Viscount of Newburgh (1647)	James Levingston, 1st Viscount of Newburgh	1647	1670	
Viscount of Oxfuird (1651)	James Makgill, 1st Viscount of Oxfuird	1651	1663	New creation
Viscount of Kingston (1651)	Alexander Seton, 1st Viscount of Kingston	1651	1691	New creation
Lord Somerville (1430)	James Somerville, 10th Lord Somerville	1640	1677	
Lord Forbes (1442)	Alexander Forbes, 10th Lord Forbes	1641	1672	
Lord Saltoun (1445)	Alexander Abernethy, 9th Lord Saltoun	1612	1668	
Lord Gray (1445)	Andrew Gray, 7th Lord Gray	1611	1663	
Lord Sinclair (1449)	John Sinclair, 9th Lord Sinclair	1615	1676	
Lord Borthwick (1452)	John Borthwick, 9th Lord Borthwick	1623	1675	
Lord Boyd (1454)	James Boyd, 9th Lord Boyd	1640	1654	Died
Lord Boyd (1454)	William Boyd, 10th Lord Boyd	1654	1692	
Lord Oliphant (1455)	Patrick Oliphant, 6th Lord Oliphant	1631	1680	
Lord Cathcart (1460)	Alan Cathcart, 6th Lord Cathcart	1628	1709	
Lord Lovat (1464)	Hugh Fraser, 8th Lord Lovat	1646	1672	
Lord Sempill (1489)	Robert Sempill, 7th Lord Sempill	1644	1675	
Lord Herries of Terregles (1490)	John Maxwell, 7th Lord Herries of Terregles	1631	1677	
Lord Ross (1499)	William Ross, 10th Lord Ross	1648	1656	Died
Lord Ross (1499)	George Ross, 11th Lord Ross	1656	1682	
Lord Elphinstone (1509)	Alexander Elphinstone, 6th Lord Elphinstone	1648	1654	Died
Lord Elphinstone (1509)	Alexander Elphinstone, 7th Lord Elphinstone	1654	1669	
Lord Ochiltree (1543)	James Stewart, 4th Lord Ochiltree	1615	1658	Died
Lord Ochiltree (1543)	William Stewart, 5th Lord Ochiltree	1658	1675	
Lord Torphichen (1564)	Walter Sandilands, 6th Lord Torphichen	1649	1696	
Lord Spynie (1590)	George Lindsay, 3rd Lord Spynie	1646	1671	
Lord Lindores (1600)	James Leslie, 3rd Lord Lindores	1649	1666	
Lord Colville of Culross (1604)	James Colville, 2nd Lord Colville of Culross	1629	1654	Died
Lord Colville of Culross (1604)	William Colville, 3rd Lord Colville of Culross	1654	1656	Died
Lord Colville of Culross (1604)	John Colville, 4th Lord Colville of Culross	1656	1680	
Lord Balmerinoch (1606)	John Elphinstone, 3rd Lord Balmerino	1649	1704	
Lord Blantyre (1606)	Alexander Stewart, 4th Lord Blantyre	1641	1670	
Lord Coupar (1607)	James Elphinstone, 1st Lord Coupar	1607	1669	
Lord Balfour of Burleigh (1607)	Robert Balfour, 2nd Lord Balfour of Burleigh	1619	1663	
Lord Cranstoun (1609)	William Cranstoun, 3rd Lord Cranstoun	1648	1664	
Lord Maderty (1609)	David Drummond, 3rd Lord Madderty	1647	1692	
Lord Dingwall (1609)	Elizabeth Preston, 2nd Lady Dingwall	1628	1684	
Lord Cardross (1610)	David Erskine, 2nd Lord Cardross	1634	1671	
Lord Melville of Monymaill (1616)	George Melville, 4th Lord Melville	1643	1707	
Lord Aston of Forfar (1627)	Walter Aston, 2nd Lord Aston of Forfar	1639	1678	
Lord Fairfax of Cameron (1627)	Thomas Fairfax, 3rd Lord Fairfax of Cameron	1648	1671	
Lord Napier (1627)	Archibald Napier, 2nd Lord Napier	1645	1660	
Lord Reay (1628)	John Mackay, 2nd Lord Reay	1649	1681	
Lord Cramond (1628)	Elizabeth Richardson, 1st Lady Cramond	1628	1651	Died
Lord Cramond (1628)	Thomas Richardson, 2nd Lord Cramond	1651	1674	
Lord Lindsay of Balcarres (1633)	Alexander Lindsay, 2nd Lord Balcarres	1641	1659	Created Earl of Balcarres, see above
Lord Forbes of Pitsligo (1633)	Alexander Forbes, 2nd Lord Forbes of Pitsligo	1636	1690	
Lord Kirkcudbright (1633)	John Maclellan, 3rd Lord Kirkcudbright	1647	1664	
Lord Fraser (1633)	Andrew Fraser, 2nd Lord Fraser	1636	1674	
Lord Forrester (1633)	George Forrester, 1st Lord Forrester	1633	1654	Died
Lord Forrester (1633)	James Baillie, 2nd Lord Forrester	1654	1676	
Lord Bargany (1641)	John Hamilton, 1st Lord Bargany	1641	1658	Died
Lord Bargany (1641)	John Hamilton, 2nd Lord Bargany	1658	1693	
Lord Balvaird (1641)	David Murray, 2nd Lord Balvaird	1644	1664	Inherited the Viscountcy of Stormont, see above
Lord Eythin (1642)	James King, 1st Lord Eythin	1642	1652	Died, title extinct
Lord Banff (1642)	George Ogilvy, 1st Lord Banff	1642	1663	
Lord Elibank (1643)	Patrick Murray, 2nd Lord Elibank	1649	1661	
Lord Dunkeld (1645)	James Galloway, 1st Lord Dunkeld	1645	1660	
Lord Falconer of Halkerton (1646)	Alexander Falconer, 1st Lord Falconer of Halkerton	1646	1671	
Lord Abercrombie (1647)	James Sandilands, 1st Lord Abercrombie	1647	1658	Died
Lord Abercrombie (1647)	James Sandilands, 2nd Lord Abercrombie	1658	1681	
Lord Belhaven and Stenton (1647)	John Hamilton, 1st Lord Belhaven and Stenton	1647	1679	
Lord Cochrane of Dundonald (1647)	William Cochrane, Lord Cochrane of Dundonald	1647	1685	
Lord Carmichael (1647)	James Carmichael, 1st Lord Carmichael	1647	1672	
Lord Duffus (1650)	Alexander Sutherland, 1st Lord Duffus	1650	1674	New creation
Lord Rollo (1651)	Andrew Rollo, 1st Lord Rollo	1650	1659	New creation; died
Lord Rollo (1651)	James Rollo, 2nd Lord Rollo	1659	1669	
Lord Ruthven of Freeland (1650)	Thomas Ruthven, 1st Lord Ruthven of Freeland	1651	1673	New creation

== Peerage of Ireland ==
Title	Holder	Date gained	Date lost	Notes
Marquess of Ormonde (1642)	James Butler, 1st Duke of Ormonde	1642	1688	
Marquess of Antrim (1645)	Randal MacDonnell, 1st Marquess of Antrim	1645	1683	
Marquess of Clanricarde (1646)	Ulick Burke, 1st Marquess of Clanricarde	1646	1657	Died, title extinct
Earl of Kildare (1316)	George FitzGerald, 16th Earl of Kildare	1620	1660	
Earl of Waterford (1446)	John Talbot, 10th Earl of Waterford	1630	1654	Died
Earl of Waterford (1446)	Francis Talbot, 11th Earl of Waterford	1654	1667	
Earl of Clanricarde (1543)	Richard Burke, 6th Earl of Clanricarde	1657	1666	Title previously held by the Marquess of Clanricarde
Earl of Thomond (1543)	Barnabas O'Brien, 6th Earl of Thomond	1639	1657	Died
Earl of Thomond (1543)	Henry O'Brien, 7th Earl of Thomond	1657	1691	
Earl of Castlehaven (1616)	James Tuchet, 3rd Earl of Castlehaven	1630	1684	
Earl of Cork (1620)	Richard Boyle, 2nd Earl of Cork	1643	1698	
Earl of Westmeath (1621)	Richard Nugent, 2nd Earl of Westmeath	1642	1684	
Earl of Roscommon (1622)	Wentworth Dillon, 4th Earl of Roscommon	1649	1685	
Earl of Londonderry (1622)	Weston Ridgeway, 3rd Earl of Londonderry	1641	1672	
Earl of Meath (1627)	William Brabazon, 1st Earl of Meath	1627	1651	Died
Earl of Meath (1627)	Edward Brabazon, 2nd Earl of Meath	1651	1675	
Earl of Barrymore (1628)	Richard Barry, 2nd Earl of Barrymore	1642	1694	
Earl of Carbery (1628)	Richard Vaughan, 2nd Earl of Carbery	1634	1687	
Earl of Fingall (1628)	Luke Plunkett, 3rd Earl of Fingall	1649	1684	
Earl of Downe (1628)	Thomas Pope, 2nd Earl of Downe	1640	1660	
Earl of Desmond (1628)	George Feilding, 1st Earl of Desmond	1628	1665	
Earl of Ardglass (1645)	Thomas Cromwell, 1st Earl of Ardglass	1645	1653	Died
Earl of Ardglass (1645)	Wingfield Cromwell, 2nd Earl of Ardglass	1653	1668	
Earl of Leinster (1646)	Robert Cholmondeley, 1st Earl of Leinster	1646	1659	Died, title extinct
Earl of Donegall (1647)	Arthur Chichester, 1st Earl of Donegall	1647	1675	
Earl of Cavan (1647)	Charles Lambart, 1st Earl of Cavan	1647	1660	
Earl of Clanbrassil (1647)	James Hamilton, 1st Earl of Clanbrassil	1647	1659	Died
Earl of Clanbrassil (1647)	Henry Hamilton, 2nd Earl of Clanbrassil	1659	1675	
Earl of Inchiquin (1654)	Murrough O'Brien, 1st Earl of Inchiquin	1654	1674	New creation
Earl of Clancarty (1658)	Donough MacCarty, 1st Earl of Clancarty	1658	1665	New creation
Viscount Gormanston (1478)	Jenico Preston, 7th Viscount Gormanston	1643	1691	
Viscount Mountgarret (1550)	Richard Butler, 3rd Viscount Mountgarret	1602	1651	Died
Viscount Mountgarret (1550)	Edmund Butler, 4th Viscount Mountgarret	1651	1679	
Viscount Grandison (1621)	John Villiers, 3rd Viscount Grandison	1643	1661	
Viscount Wilmot (1621)	Henry Wilmot, 2nd Viscount Wilmot	1644	1658	Created Earl of Rochester in the Peerage of England; died
Viscount Wilmot (1621)	Henry Wilmot, 3rd Viscount Wilmot	1658	1680	
Viscount Valentia (1622)	Francis Annesley, 1st Viscount Valentia	1642	1660	
Viscount Moore (1621)	Henry Moore, 3rd Viscount Moore	1643	1675	
Viscount Dillon (1622)	Thomas Dillon, 4th Viscount Dillon	1630	1672	
Viscount Loftus (1622)	Edward Loftus, 2nd Viscount Loftus	1643	1680	
Viscount Beaumont of Swords (1622)	Sapcote Beaumont, 2nd Viscount Beaumont of Swords	1625	1658	Died
Viscount Beaumont of Swords (1622)	Thomas Beaumont, 3rd Viscount Beaumont of Swords	1658	1702	
Viscount Netterville (1622)	Nicholas Netterville, 1st Viscount Netterville	1622	1654	Died
Viscount Netterville (1622)	John Netterville, 2nd Viscount Netterville	1654	1659	Died
Viscount Netterville (1622)	Nicholas Netterville, 3rd Viscount Netterville	1659	1689	
Viscount Montgomery (1622)	Hugh Montgomery, 3rd Viscount Montgomery	1642	1663	
Viscount Magennis (1623)	Arthur Magennis, 3rd Viscount Magennis	1639	1683	
Viscount Kilmorey (1625)	Robert Needham, 2nd Viscount Kilmorey	1631	1653	Died
Viscount Kilmorey (1625)	Robert Needham, 3rd Viscount Kilmorey	1653	1657	Died
Viscount Kilmorey (1625)	Charles Needham, 4th Viscount Kilmorey	1657	1660	
Viscount Baltinglass (1627)	Thomas Roper, 2nd Viscount Baltinglass	1637	1670	
Viscount Castleton (1627)	Peregrine Saunderson, 4th Viscount Castleton	1641	1650	Died
Viscount Castleton (1627)	George Saunderson, 5th Viscount Castleton	1650	1714	
Viscount Killultagh (1627)	Edward Conway, 2nd Viscount Killultagh	1631	1655	Died
Viscount Killultagh (1627)	Edward Conway, 3rd Viscount Killultagh	1655	1683	
Viscount Mayo (1627)	Theobald Bourke, 3rd Viscount Mayo	1649	1652	Died
Viscount Mayo (1627)	Theobald Bourke, 4th Viscount Mayo	1652	1676	
Viscount Sarsfield (1627)	David Sarsfield, 3rd Viscount Sarsfield	1648	1687	
Viscount Chaworth (1628)	Patrick Chaworth, 3rd Viscount Chaworth	1644	1693	
Viscount Savile (1628)	Thomas Savile, 1st Viscount Savile	1628	1659	Died
Viscount Savile (1628)	James Savile, 2nd Viscount Savile	1659	1671	
Viscount Lumley (1628)	Richard Lumley, 1st Viscount Lumley	1628	1663	
Viscount Taaffe (1628)	Theobald Taaffe, 2nd Viscount Taaffe	1642	1677	
Viscount Molyneux (1628)	Richard Molyneux, 2nd Viscount Molyneux	1636	1654	Died
Viscount Molyneux (1628)	Caryll Molyneux, 3rd Viscount Molyneux	1654	1699	
Viscount Monson (1628)	William Monson, 1st Viscount Monson	1628	1660	
Viscount Muskerry (1628)	Donough MacCarty, 2nd Viscount Muskerry	1640	1665	Created Earl of Clancarty, see above
Viscount Strangford (1628)	Philip Smythe, 2nd Viscount Strangford	1635	1708	
Viscount Scudamore (1628)	John Scudamore, 1st Viscount Scudamore	1628	1671	
Viscount Wenman (1628)	Thomas Wenman, 2nd Viscount Wenman	1640	1665	
Viscount Ranelagh (1628)	Arthur Jones, 2nd Viscount Ranelagh	1643	1669	
Viscount Bourke of Clanmories (1629)	Thomas Bourke, 2nd Viscount Bourke	1635	1650	Died, title succeeded by the Marquess of Clanricarde
Viscount FitzWilliam (1629)	Thomas FitzWilliam, 1st Viscount FitzWilliam	1629	1650	Died
Viscount FitzWilliam (1629)	Oliver FitzWilliam, 2nd Viscount Fitzwilliam	1650	1667	
Viscount Fairfax of Emley (1629)	Thomas Fairfax, 4th Viscount Fairfax of Emley	1648	1651	Died
Viscount Fairfax of Emley (1629)	Charles Fairfax, 5th Viscount Fairfax of Emley	1651	1711	
Viscount Ikerrin (1629)	Pierce Butler, 1st Viscount Ikerrin	1629	1674	
Viscount Clanmalier (1631)	Lewis O'Dempsey, 2nd Viscount Clanmalier	1638	1683	
Viscount Cullen (1642)	Charles Cokayne, 1st Viscount Cullen	1642	1661	
Viscount Carrington (1643)	Charles Smyth, 1st Viscount Carrington	1643	1665	
Viscount Tracy (1643)	Robert Tracy, 2nd Viscount Tracy	1648	1662	
Viscount Bulkeley (1644)	Thomas Bulkeley, 1st Viscount Bulkeley	1644	1659	Died
Viscount Bulkeley (1644)	Robert Bulkeley, 2nd Viscount Bulkeley	1659	1688	
Viscount Bellomont (1645)	Henry Bard, 1st Viscount Bellomont	1645	1656	Died
Viscount Bellomont (1645)	Charles Rupert Bard, 2nd Viscount Bellomont	1656	1667	
Viscount Brouncker (1645)	William Brouncker, 2nd Viscount Brouncker	1645	1684	
Viscount Ogle (1645)	William Ogle, 1st Viscount Ogle	1645	1682	
Viscount Barnewall (1646)	Nicholas Barnewall, 1st Viscount Barnewall	1646	1663	
Viscount Galmoye (1646)	Edward Butler, 1st Viscount of Galmoye	1646	1653	Died
Viscount Galmoye (1646)	Edward Butler, 2nd Viscount of Galmoye	1653	1667	
Viscount Tara (1650)	Thomas Preston, 1st Viscount Tara	1650	1655	New creation, died
Viscount Tara (1650)	Anthony Preston, 2nd Viscount Tara	1655	1659	Died
Viscount Tara (1650)	Thomas Preston, 3rd Viscount Tara	1659	1674	
Baron Athenry (1172)	Francis de Bermingham, 12th Baron Athenry	1645	1677	
Baron Kingsale (1223)	Patrick de Courcy, 20th Baron Kingsale	1642	1663	
Baron Kerry (1223)	Patrick Fitzmaurice, 19th Baron Kerry	1630	1661	
Baron Slane (1370)	Charles Fleming, 15th Baron Slane	1641	1661	
Baron Howth (1425)	William St Lawrence, 12th Baron Howth	1643	1671	
Baron Trimlestown (1461)	Matthias Barnewall, 8th Baron Trimlestown	1539	1667	
Baron Dunsany (1462)	Patrick Plunkett, 9th Baron of Dunsany	1603	1668	
Baron Power (1535)	John Power, 5th Baron Power	1607	1661	
Baron Dunboyne (1541)	James Butler, 4th/14th Baron Dunboyne	1640	1662	
Baron Louth (1541)	Oliver Plunkett, 6th Baron Louth	1629	1679	
Baron Upper Ossory (1541)	Barnaby Fitzpatrick, 6th Baron Upper Ossory	1638	1666	
Baron Inchiquin (1543)	Murrough O'Brien, 6th Baron Inchiquin	1624	1674	Created Earl of Inchiquin, see above
Baron Bourke of Castleconnell (1580)	William Bourke, 6th Baron Bourke of Connell	1635	1665	
Baron Cahir (1583)	Pierce Butler, 4th Baron Cahir	1648	1676	
Baron Hamilton (1617)	James Hamilton, 3rd Baron Hamilton of Strabane	1638	1655	Died
Baron Hamilton (1617)	George Hamilton, 4th Baron Hamilton of Strabane	1655	1668	
Baron Bourke of Brittas (1618)	Theobald Bourke, 1st Baron Bourke of Brittas	1618	1654	Died
Baron Bourke of Brittas (1618)	John Bourke, 2nd Baron Bourke of Brittas	1654	1668	
Baron Mountjoy (1618)	Mountjoy Blount, 1st Baron Mountjoy	1618	1665	
Baron Castle Stewart (1619)	Andrew Stewart, 3rd Baron Castle Stewart	1639	1650	Died
Baron Castle Stewart (1619)	Josias Stewart, 4th Baron Castle Stewart	1650	1662	
Baron Folliot (1620)	Thomas Folliott, 2nd Baron Folliott	1622	1697	
Baron Maynard (1620)	William Maynard, 2nd Baron Maynard	1640	1699	
Baron Gorges of Dundalk (1620)	Edward Gorges, 1st Baron Gorges of Dundalk	1620	1650	Died
Baron Gorges of Dundalk (1620)	Richard Gorges, 2nd Baron Gorges of Dundalk	1650	1712	
Baron Offaly (1620)	Lettice Digby, 1st Baroness Offaly	1620	1658	Died; title succeeded by the Earl of Kildare
Baron Digby (1620)	Kildare Digby, 2nd Baron Digby	1642	1661	
Baron Fitzwilliam (1620)	William Fitzwilliam, 2nd Baron Fitzwilliam	1644	1658	Died
Baron Fitzwilliam (1620)	William Fitzwilliam, 3rd Baron Fitzwilliam	1658	1719	
Baron Caulfeild (1620)	William Caulfeild, 5th Baron Caulfield	1642	1671	
Baron Aungier (1621)	Gerald Aungier, 2nd Baron Aungier of Longford	1632	1655	Died
Baron Aungier (1621)	Francis Aungier, 3rd Baron Aungier of Longford	1655	1700	
Baron Blayney (1621)	Edward Blayney, 3rd Baron Blayney	1646	1669	
Baron Brereton (1624)	William Brereton, 2nd Baron Brereton	1631	1664	
Baron Herbert of Castle Island (1624)	Richard Herbert, 2nd Baron Herbert of Castle Island	1648	1655	Died
Baron Herbert of Castle Island (1624)	Edward Herbert, 3rd Baron Herbert of Castle Island	1655	1678	
Baron Baltimore (1625)	Cecilius Calvert, 2nd Baron Baltimore	1632	1675	
Baron Coleraine (1625)	Hugh Hare, 1st Baron Coleraine	1625	1667	
Baron Sherard (1627)	Bennet Sherard, 2nd Baron Sherard	1640	1700	
Baron Boyle of Broghill (1628)	Roger Boyle, 1st Baron Boyle of Broghill	1628	1679	
Baron Alington (1642)	Giles Alington, 2nd Baron Alington	1648	1659	Died
Baron Alington (1642)	William Alington, 3rd Baron Alington	1659	1685	
Baron Hawley (1646)	Francis Hawley, 1st Baron Hawley	1646	1684	

Preceded by List of peers 1640–1649	Lists of peers by decade 1650–1659	Succeeded by List of peers 1660–1669
