= Charles Fairfax, 5th Viscount Fairfax of Emley =

English peer

Charles Fairfax, 5th Viscount Fairfax of Emley (died 6 July 1711), was an English peer.

Fairfax was the son of Thomas Fairfax, 2nd Viscount Fairfax of Emley, by Alathea Howard, daughter of Sir Philip Howard, son of Lord William Howard. He succeeded his nephew in the viscountcy in 1651. This was an Irish peerage and did not entitle him to a seat in the English House of Lords (although it did entitle him to a seat in the Irish House of Lords). In 1687 he was appointed Lord-Lieutenant of the North Riding of Yorkshire. A Roman Catholic, he actively canvassed the local gentry in the cause of James II. He was suspicious, as he told Sir John Reresby, of the activities of the Earls of Danby and Devonshire in Yorkshire, saying "it could be for no good end that [they] were come down to the country"; and indeed they were plotting the Glorious Revolution. As the gentry of Yorkshire refused to serve under a Catholic, he and the other Yorkshire lieutenants were replaced by the Protestant Duke of Newcastle in October 1688.

Lord Fairfax of Emley married Abigail Yate, daughter of Sir John Yate, 2nd Baronet. Their daughter, the Honourable Alathea Fairfax, married William Widdrington, 3rd Baron Widdrington, and was the mother of William Widdrington, 4th Baron Widdrington. Lord Fairfax of Emley died in July 1711. He had no sons and was succeeded in the title by his nephew, Charles.

Honorary titles
Preceded by The Viscount Fauconberg	Lord-Lieutenant of the North Riding of Yorkshire; 1687–1688	Succeeded by The Duke of Newcastle
Peerage of Ireland
Preceded by Thomas Fairfax	Viscount Fairfax of Emley; 1651–1711	Succeeded by Charles Fairfax
