= William Ogle, 1st Viscount Ogle =

English Royalist soldier and politician

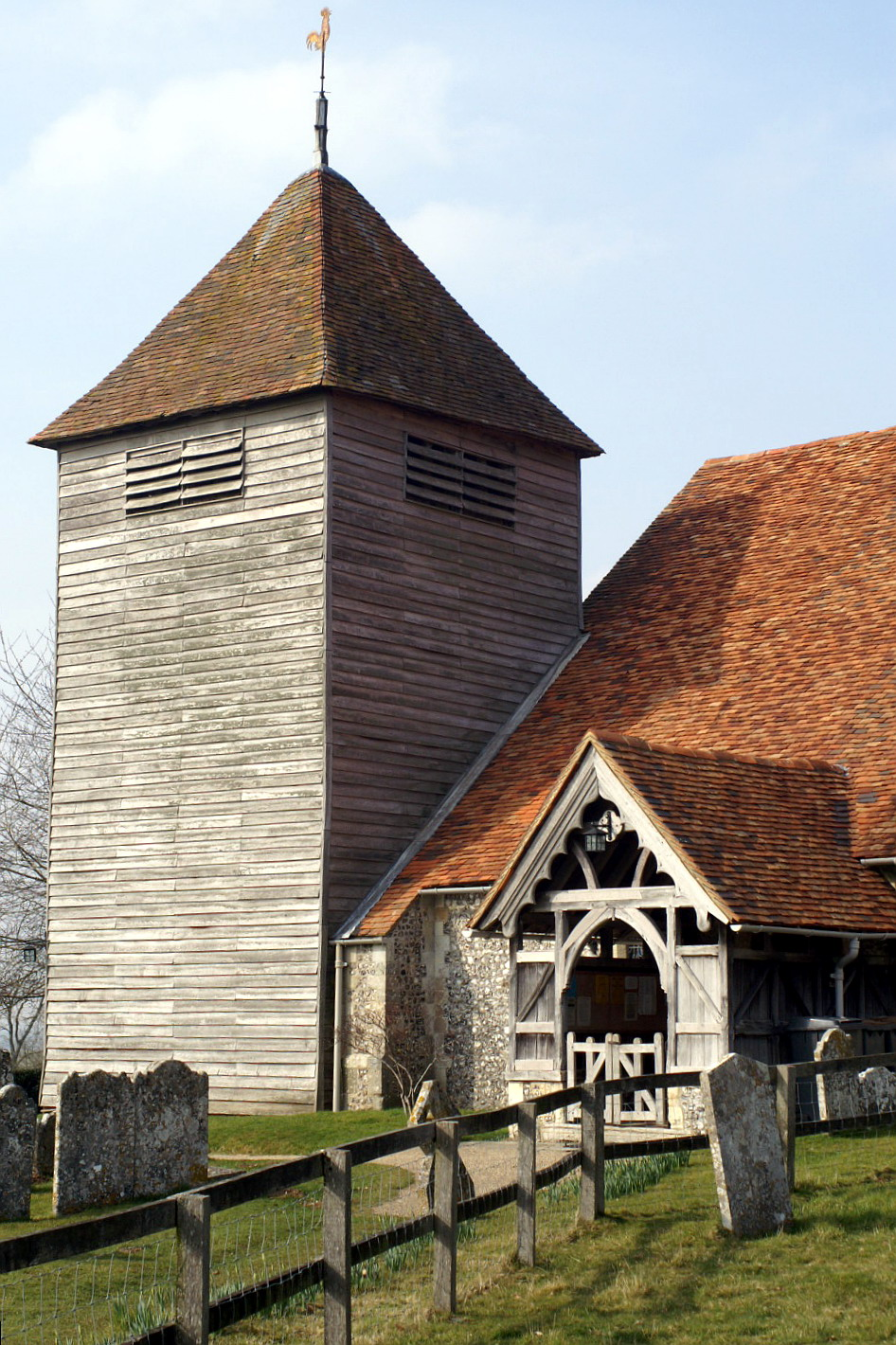
- St Marys Michelmersh, where Ogle was buried

Royalist Governor of Winchester
- In office October 1643 – October 1645

Member of Parliament for Winchester
- In office November 1640 – June 1643 (excluded)

Personal details
- Born: 1600 Northumberland
- Died: 14 July 1682 (aged 81) Michelmersh manor, Hampshire
- Resting place: St Marys Michelmersh
- Party: Royalist
- Spouse(s): (1) Charity Waller (1627-1645) (2) Sarah Stewkley (1648-died before 1682)
- Children: Sarah (after 1648–after 1682)
- Occupation: Soldier

Military service
- Allegiance: England
- Rank: Colonel
- Battles/wars: Bishops' Wars; Irish Confederate Wars; First English Civil War; Siege of Winchester Castle

William Ogle, 1st Viscount Ogle (c. 1600 – 14 July 1682) was an English soldier from Northumberland who settled in Hampshire and was Member of Parliament for Winchester from 1640 to 1643. He served in a number of wars and was Royalist governor of Winchester from 1643 to 1645.

== Personal details ==
William Ogle was born around 1600 near Ashington, son of Cuthbert Ogle; the Ogles were landed gentry distributed throughout Northumberland, whose relatives included William Cavendish, 1st Duke of Newcastle, Royalist commander in Northern England from 1642 to 1644.

In 1627, Ogle married Charity Waller (1595-1645), cousin of the Parliamentarian general Sir William Waller and widow of Sir Thomas Phelips (1590-1626), MP for Winchester. Ogle lived on her estates nearby in Stoke Charity and although they had no children he became guardian of her sons Thomas (1621-1644), killed serving in the Royalist army, and James (1625-1652). In 1648 he married another widow, Sarah Stewkley (died after 1667), who owned property in Michelmersh, near Southampton; they had a daughter Sarah (died after 1682).

== Career ==
Details of Ogle's military career prior to 1639 are scarce although it may have begun in Europe during the early stages of the Thirty Years War. He probably served in Ireland in this period, was knighted in 1628 and commanded a regiment during the 1639 and 1640 Bishops' Wars. In April 1640, he was elected MP for Winchester in the Short Parliament and re-elected to the Long Parliament in November.

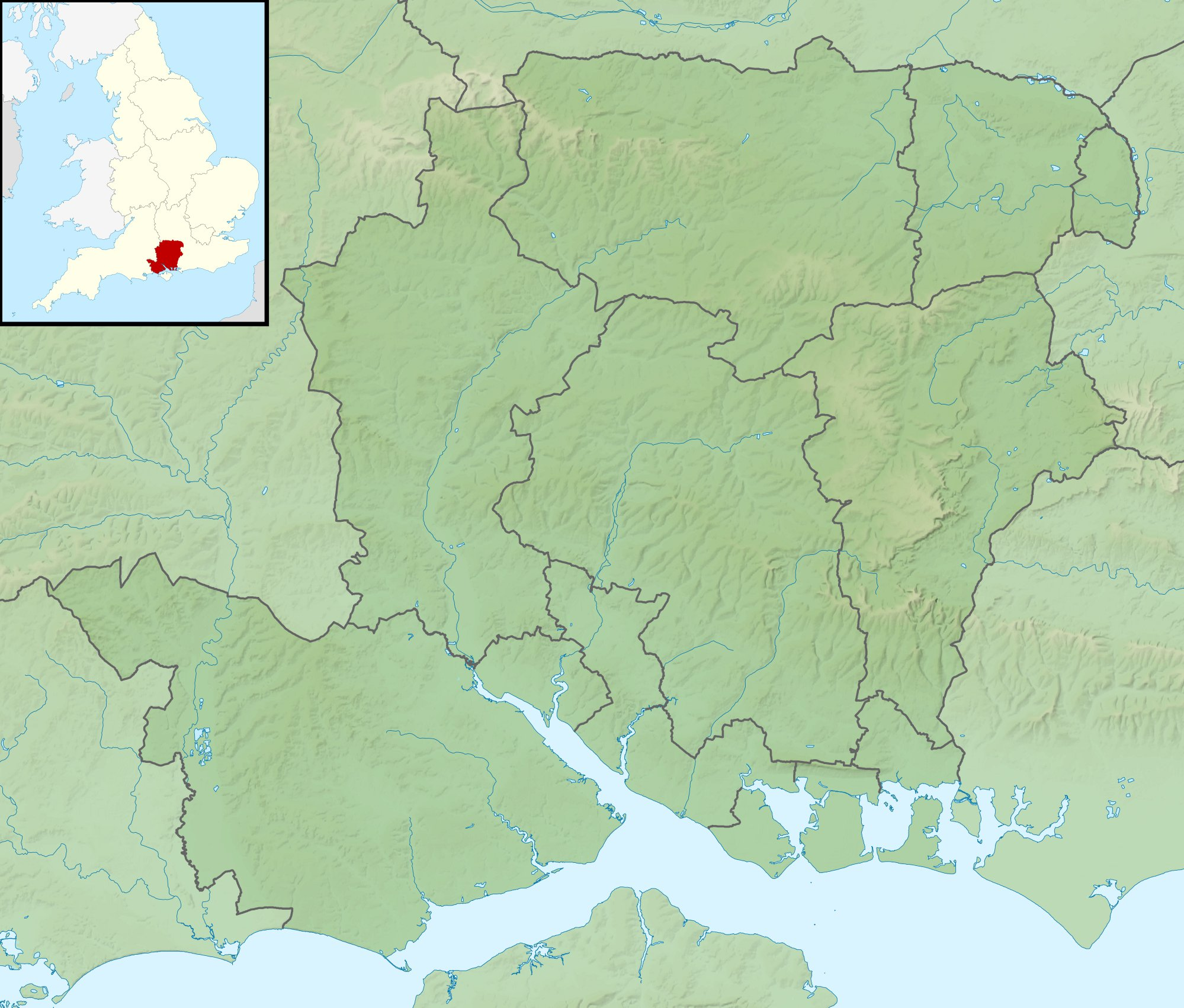
Ogle's Hampshire; key locations

Following the outbreak of the Irish Rebellion of 1641, Ogle commanded one of three regiments raised by Parliament, all of which were led by Irish veterans. They landed in Munster in May 1642 but just after the First English Civil War began in August, Richard Boyle, 1st Earl of Cork reported to Parliament all three were severely weakened by sickness and exhaustion.

In September 1643, Charles I agreed a truce with Confederate Ireland, allowing him to transfer units of the Irish Royal Army to England. They included Ogle's regiment, although he may have returned prior to this as he was excluded from Parliament in June along with other former Irish officers who joined the king. He transferred to the army being assembled by Sir Ralph Hopton for an attack on Hampshire and Sussex, whose Wealden iron industry was Parliament's main source of armaments.

In late October, a scouting party led by Ogle discovered the Parliamentarian garrison of Winchester had been withdrawn and occupied the town. Unfortunately, his prompt action forced Hopton to advance before gathering enough supplies and money to pay and feed his men. On reaching Winchester in early November, some of the Irish troops in his force mutinied in protest and several were executed before order was restored.

Ogle was appointed Governor of Winchester Castle and retained it until October 1645. His two stepsons served in the garrison, Thomas dying in a skirmish just before the Battle of Cheriton in March 1644, a defeat that ended Hopton's hopes of regaining South East England. The destruction of the main Royalist field army in June 1645 at Naseby reduced their presence outside South West England to isolated garrisons like Winchester. On 28 September, a detachment of the New Model Army under Oliver Cromwell arrived at Winchester and began constructing gun emplacements. Cromwell offered terms which Ogle refused; by 4 October the Parliamentarian artillery had breached the walls and he surrendered the next day.

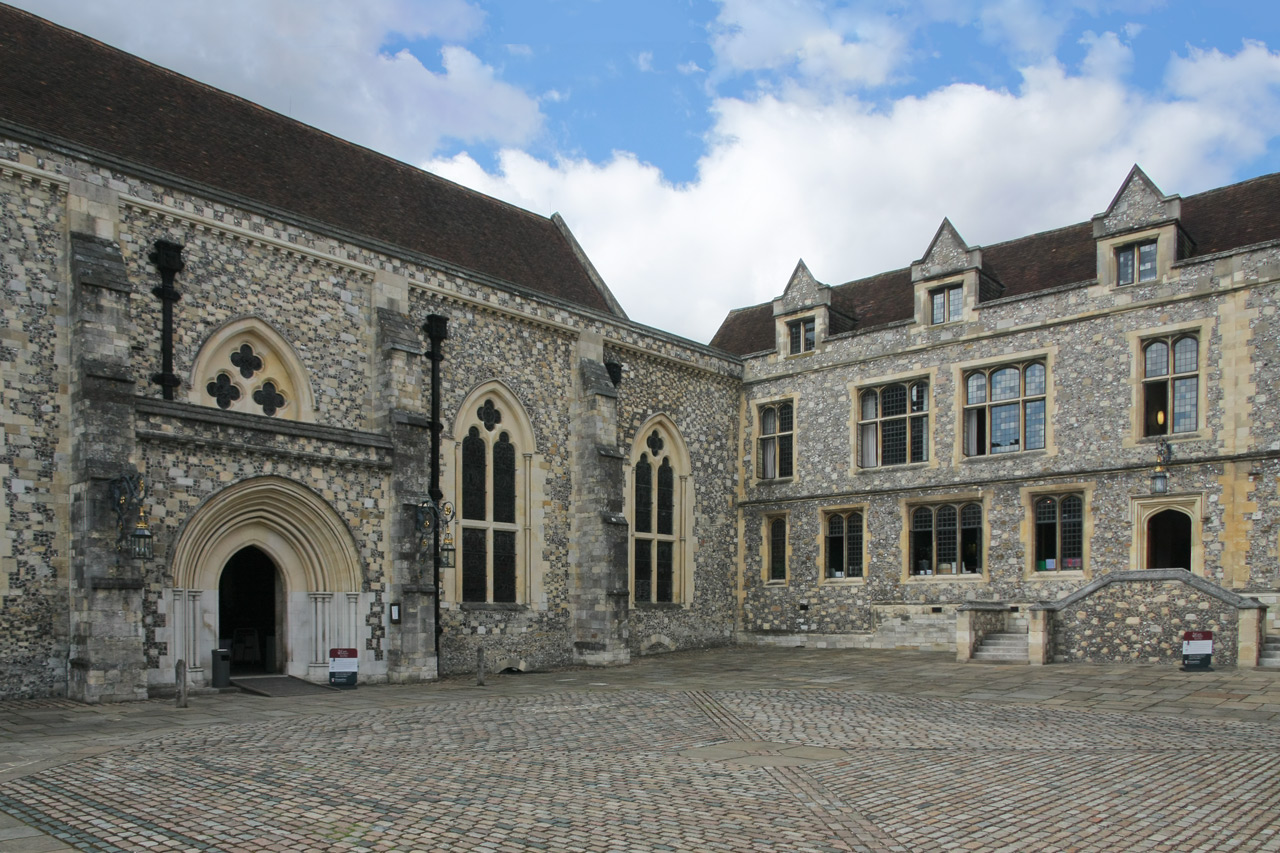
The Great Hall at Winchester Castle

Since he had 700 men and plenty of supplies, Ogle was subsequently court-martialled by the Royalist high command but he may have influenced by the presence of civilians such as his sick wife, who died the same day. Under the prevailing military convention, a garrison which continued to resist after a "practicable breach" had been made could expect no quarter for themselves or their dependents. This happened at Basing House, the last significant Royalist position in Hampshire which was sacked on 14 October and many of its defenders killed.

Ogle was allowed passage to Oxford, where he was acquitted then ennobled as "Viscount Ogle of Catherlough" in the Peerage of Ireland. The selection of "Catherlough", now modern Carlow, provides a clue to his previous service, although the reason for the award is unclear; by now the Royalist high command had split into factions, each trying to secure support by handing out increasingly valueless posts. When Oxford surrendered in June 1646, Ogle was allowed to return home after paying a small fine.

According to a letter written by Cromwell, the death of his wife "deprived him of an income of £1,000 per year", while her estate went to her younger son James, who had served as a captain in the Winchester garrison. Although Ogle soon remarried, he was imprisoned for debt in 1665, while his second wife Sarah wrote a series of letters on his behalf asking he be compensated for expenses incurred while governor of Winchester. Little is known of his life after 1667; his monument in St Mary's records he died on 14 July 1682.

== Sources ==
- Afflerbach, Holger; Strachan, Hew, eds. (2012). How Fighting Ends: A History of Surrender. OUP. ISBN 978-0199693627.
- AW (1867). Michaelmarsh and its antiquities: together with notices of the New Forest, Hampshire. Spottiswoode & Co.
- Grosart, Alexander (1888). The Lismore Papers Volume 5. Private.
- Hibbert, Christopher (1993). Cavaliers and Roundheads; the English at war 1642-1649 (1994 ed.). Harper Collins. ISBN 978-0586090084.
- Moseley, Virginia; Sgroi, Rosemary (2010). PHELIPS (PHILLIPS), Sir Thomas, 1st Bt. (1590-1626), of Barrington, Som. and Winchester, Hants in The History of Parliament: the House of Commons 1604-1629. CUP.
- Newman, Peter (1993). The Old Service Royalist Regimental Colonels and the Civil War, 1642-46. Manchester University Press. ISBN 978-0719037528.
- Page, William (1908). A History of the County of Hampshire: Volume 3. Victoria County History.
- Royle, Trevor (2004). Civil War: The War of the Three Kingdoms 1638-1660. Brown, Little. ISBN 978-0316861250.
- St Mary's Churchyard. "William Ogle (Memorial ID: 192313121)". Find A Grave.
- Wanklyn, Frank; Jones, Robert (2005). A Military History of the English Civil War: 1642-1649. Pearson Longman. ISBN 978-0582772816.
- Wedgwood, CV (1958). The King's War, 1641-1647 (2001 ed.). Penguin Classics. ISBN 978-0141390727.
- Willis, Browne (1715). Notitia Parliamentaria, Or, An History of the Counties, Cities, and Boroughs in England and Wales. Gosling.

Parliament of England
Preceded by Robert Mason	Member of Parliament for Winchester; 1640–1643; With: John Lisle	Succeeded by John Lisle; Nicholas Love
Peerage of Ireland
New creation	Viscount Ogle; 1645–1682	Extinct
