= William Crofts, 1st Baron Crofts =

English peer and Gentleman of the Bedchamber

William Crofts, 1st Baron Crofts (c.1611–1677) was an English baron and Gentleman of the Bedchamber to Charles II.

== Life ==
He was the son of Sir Henry Crofts, MP, of Little Saxham, Suffolk.

He moved to court c.1630 as a servant of Queen Henrietta Maria, the consort of Charles I.

The lady in waiting to Elizabeth Stuart, Queen of Bohemia known as "Margaret Crofts" has sometimes been identified as his sister. However, the will of Margaret Croft from Herefordshire seems to identify her as this royal servant. William Crofts carried letters to the court of Elizabeth of Bohemia.

In 1644 his brother was shot in the head by the queen's court dwarf Jeffrey Hudson during a duel, which was outlawed at the time. Henrietta Maria wrote to Cardinal Mazarin to intercede for Hudson's life.

During the Civil War he remained loyal to the king and queen, and was rewarded by the grant of several manors in Essex and Suffolk. He followed Charles II into exile in France and in 1651-52 was sent on diplomatic missions to Eastern Europe, primarily to raise funds. For his loyal services he was made in 1652 a Gentleman of the Bedchamber to the still exiled Charles II. In 1658 he was ennobled as Baron Crofts of Saxham and in that year was given charge of James, the illegitimate son of Charles II by Lucy Walter, who had recently died. In 1667 he succeeded his father, inheriting Little Saxham Hall, the family seat, which he made his home.

He married twice, firstly Dorothy, the daughter of Sir John Hobart, Bt. and widow of Sir John Hele and secondly Elizabeth, the daughter of Lord Spencer of Wormleighton. Upon his death in 1677 he was laid to rest in Little Saxham church, where there is an impressive memorial to him and his wife.

Peerage of England
New creation	Baron Crofts; 1658–1677	Extinct
