= Lord Dunkeld =

- Argent, a lion rampant azure armed and langued gules
- Creation date: 1645
- Created by: Charles I
- First holder: Sir James Galloway of Carnby
- Last holder: James Galloway, 3rd Lord Dunkeld
- Extinction date: 1728

Lord Dunkeld was a title in the Peerage of Scotland created in 1645 for Sir James Galloway of Carnby.

Sir James was the only surviving son of Patrick Galloway, a prominent minister from Perth, and his first wife Martillo Guthrie. He served as Master of Requests to James VI and Charles I, and was made a Privy Councillor in 1630. He was ennobled by King Charles on 15 May 1645, for his faithful service during the civil war.

He married an unknown daughter of a knight named Sir Robert Norter, and by her had one son Thomas, the second Lord Dunkeld. Thomas married Margaret Thomson, daughter of Sir Thomas Thomson of Duddingston, and by her had six sons and eight daughters, some of which died young: James, William, Thomas, John, Andrew, Margaret, Catherine, Jean, Anne, Elizabeth, Mary, Margaret, and Grisell.

The eldest son James became the third Lord Dunkeld. He succeeded his father to the title c. 1684, though his father will still alive at that point and ultimately would post-decease him. Upon the Jacobite Uprisings against the rule of William of Orange, James took the side of the Jacobites, and had a commanding role in the Battle of Killiecrankie. For this his title was forfeited, and he was condemned to death for treachery. He fled to France, where he took up residence at the Jacobite court in St Germain. He was later killed while fighting for the French in the Battle of Cassano.

James married Eleanor Sale, and by her had a son James and a daughter Mary. Mary became a nun at the convent of Val-de-Grâce in Paris, while James, who would have been the fourth Lord Dunkeld had the title not been forfeit, joined the military. He eventually reached the rank of brigadier of infantry in the Garde du Corps, and was created a chevalier of the Order of Saint Louis. He was later created a maréchal de camp, equivalent to a British major-general.

James married twice, firstly Marie Madeleine Angelique Le Rat ( mariée en 1 er avec Marc Ambroise Ancelin) and secondly with: Marie Anne Thérèse Ancelin, sa belle-fille. None of his children reached adulthood, and subsequently the line died.

== Arms ==
The ancestral arms of the first Lord Dunkeld were argent, a lion rampant azure armed and langued gules. In 1630 he was granted the addition of a crest and motto by Sir James Balfour of Kinnaid, then Lord Lyon King of Arms. The original grant describes the crest as upon an Wreath Arg. and Azure, a Mound bespread with the Rayes of the Sun proper, embrac'd betwixt two Corn ears Saltoir wayes Or; and above all in an Escrol this motto, Higher.

Upon his ennoblement he became entitled to add supporters to his arms, and subsequently adopted two eagles sable.

== List of Lords ==
- James Galloway, first Lord Dunkeld, Knight (c. 1585-1660)
- Thomas Galloway, second Lord Dunkeld (16??-1728)
- James Galloway, third Lord Dunkeld (1664-1705) (title forfeit)
