= Viscount Fairfax of Emley =

Viscount Fairfax of Emley, in the County of Tipperary, was a title in the Peerage of Ireland. It was created on 10 February 1629 for Sir Thomas Fairfax, previously Member of Parliament for Hedon. The fifth Viscount was Lord Lieutenant of the North Riding of Yorkshire. The title became extinct upon the death of the ninth Viscount in 1772, all of whose children, apart from his daughter Anne, died in infancy.

== Viscounts Fairfax of Emley (1629) ==
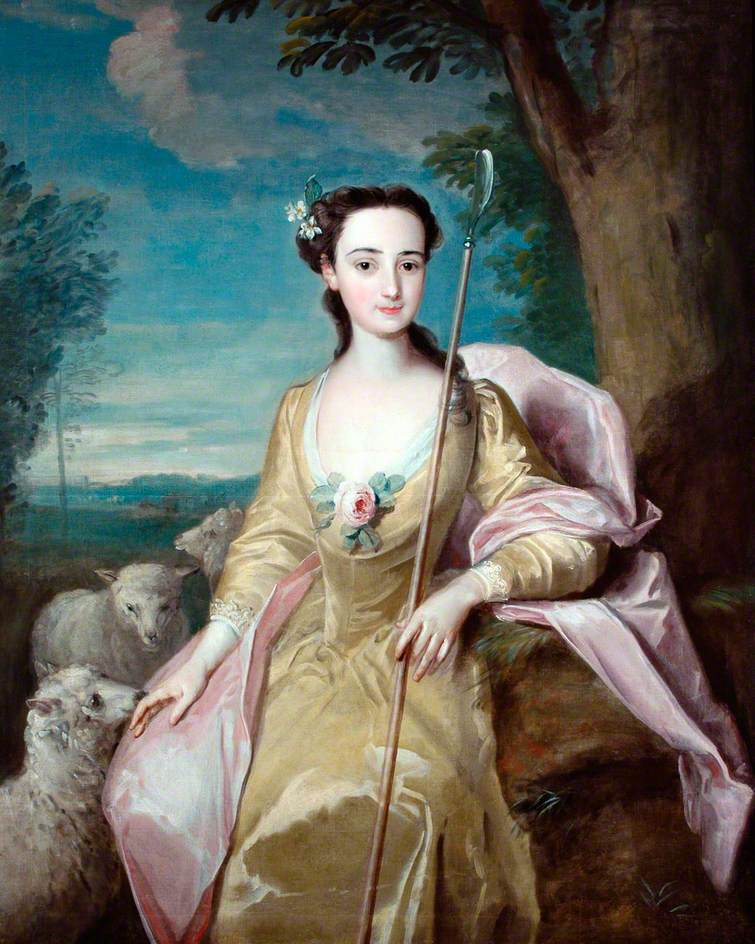
- Anne Fairfax, the only surviving child of the 9th Viscount Fairfax, painted as a shepherdess by Philippe Mercier
  Thomas Fairfax, 1st Viscount Fairfax of Emley (1574–1636)
- Thomas Fairfax, 2nd Viscount Fairfax of Emley (c. 1604–1641)
- William Fairfax, 3rd Viscount Fairfax of Emley (1620–1648)
- Thomas Fairfax, 4th Viscount Fairfax of Emley (died 1651)
- Charles Fairfax, 5th Viscount Fairfax of Emley (died 1711)
- Charles Fairfax, 6th Viscount Fairfax of Emley (died 1715)
- Charles Fairfax, 7th Viscount Fairfax of Emley (died 1719)
- William Fairfax, 8th Viscount Fairfax of Emley (died 1738)
- Charles Gregory Fairfax, 9th Viscount Fairfax of Emley (died 1772)
