= Dillon (surname) =

Dillon is a surname that is common in Ireland and commonly used by Irish descendants.

== Notable people with the surname "Dillon" include ==
=== A ===
- A. J. Dillon (born 1998), American football player
- Alan Dillon (born 1982), Irish politician
- Alfred Dillon (1841–1915), New Zealand politician
- Andrew Dillon (health administrator) (born 1954), English health executive
- Andrew Dillon (sports administrator), Australian sports administrator
- Andy Dillon (born 1962), American politician
- Ann Turner Dillon, American political figure
- Antron Dillon (born 1985), American football player
- Arthur Dillon (disambiguation), multiple people
- Artie Dillon (1894–1948), Australian rules footballer
- Asia Kate Dillon (born 1984), American actor
- Austin Dillon (born 1990), American race car driver

=== B ===
- Barbara Dillon, American author
- Bartholomew Dillon (??–1533), Irish judge
- Bernard Dillon (1888–1941), Irish jockey
- Bethany Dillon (born 1988), American musician
- Bill Dillon (disambiguation), multiple people
- Bobby Dillon (1930–2019), American football player
- Brandon Dillon (politician) (born 1972), American politician
- Brandon Dillon (American football) (born 1997), American football player
- Brenden Dillon (born 1990), Canadian ice hockey player
- Brian Dillon (1830–1872), Irish activist
- Brian Dillon (judge) (1925–2003), British lawyer

=== C ===
- Cara Dillon (born 1975), Northern Irish folk singer
- Carey Dillon (1627–1689), Irish nobleman
- Carmen Dillon (1908–2000), English art director
- Cass Dillon (born 1986), American singer-songwriter
- C. Douglas Dillon (1909–2003), American politician
- Cecil Dillon (1908–1969), Canadian-American ice hockey player
- Cecily Dillon (1603–1653), Irish nun
- Charles Dillon (disambiguation), multiple people
- Chester C. Dillon (1887–1971), American football player and coach
- Chris Dillon (born 1965), American attorney
- Cian Dillon (born 1988), Irish hurler
- Clarence Dillon (1882–1979), American businessman
- Constantine Dillon (1813–1853), English army officer
- Corey Dillon (born 1974), American football player
- Costa Dillon (born 1953), American writer and actor

=== D ===
- Danica Dillon (born 1987), American pornographic actress
- Daniel Dillon (disambiguation), multiple people
- David Dillon (businessman) (born 1951), American businessman
- David Dillon (journalist), British journalist
- Dean Dillon (born 1955), American musician
- Denis E. Dillon (1933–2010), American politician
- Denise Dillon (born 1973), American basketball player and coach
- Dennis Anthony Dillon (born 1959), American minister
- Denny Dillon (born 1951), American actress
- Derrick Dillon (born 1995), American football player
- Des Dillon (disambiguation), multiple people
- Doug Dillon (1924–1999), New Zealand lawyer

=== E ===
- Éamonn Dillon (born 1992), Irish hurler
- Edmund Dillon (born 1955), Trinidadian military officer
- Edward Dillon (disambiguation), multiple people
- Eilís Dillon (1920–1994), Irish author
- E. J. Dillon (1854–1933), Irish author
- Eleanor Dillon (1601–1629), Irish nun
- Elizabeth Dillon (disambiguation), multiple people
- Emer Dillon (born 1981), Irish camogie player
- Enrica Clay Dillon (1885–1946), American opera singer
- Eoin Dillon (born 1987), Irish hurler
- Eric Dillon (1881–1946), Irish soldier

=== F ===
- Faith Dillon (born 2002), American taekwondo athlete
- Fannie Charles Dillon (1881–1947), American pianist
- Fanny Dillon (1785–1836), French noblewoman
- Francis R. Dillon (1939–2023), American general
- Frank Dillon (1873–1931), American baseball player
- Frank J. Dillon (1867–1954), American artist

=== G ===
- Gareth Dillon, Irish Gaelic footballer
- Garrett Dillon (1640–1696), Irish politician
- Gary Dillon (born 1959), Canadian ice hockey player
- Gary P. Dillon (born 1943), American politician
- George Dillon (disambiguation), multiple people
- Geraldine Dillon (1936–2020), Australian chef
- Geraldine Plunkett Dillon (1891–1986), Irish activist
- Gerard Dillon (1916–1971), Irish artist
- Gerard B. Dillon (born 1962), Irish politician
- Glyn Dillon (born 1971), British costume designer
- Griffin Dillon (born 2003), American soccer player
- Gus Dillon (1881–1952), Canadian lacrosse player

=== H ===
- Harold Dillon (1844–1932), English antiquary
- Helen Dillon (born 1940), Scottish gardener
- Henry Dillon (disambiguation), multiple people
- Herman Dillon (1931–2004), American tribal leader
- Hook Dillon (1924–2004), American basketball player
- H. S. Dillon (1945–2019), Indonesian politician
- Hugh Dillon (born 1963), Canadian musician and actor

=== J ===
- Jack Dillon (1891–1942), American boxer
- Jake Dillon (born 1993), Irish hurler
- James Dillon (disambiguation), multiple people
- Jane Dillon, British designer
- Jen O'Malley Dillon (born 1976), American political strategist
- Jerome Dillon (born 1969), American musician
- Jessica Dillon (born 1995), Australian footballer
- Jimmy Dillon (born 1978/1979), American politician
- Joan Dillon (born 1935), American-French royal
- Joan Dillon (historic preservation activist) (1925–2008), American activist
- Joe Dillon (born 1975), American baseball player
- Joe Dillon (born 1985), Mayo U21 All Ireland medalist
- Joey Dillon (born 1992), American soccer player
- Joey Rocketshoes Dillon, American historian
- John Dillon (disambiguation), multiple people
- Joseph E. Dillon (1921–1990), American politician
- Josephine Dillon (1884–1971), American actress
- Julia Dillon (disambiguation), multiple people
- Julie Dillon (born 1982), American illustrator

=== K ===
- Karen Dillon (disambiguation), multiple people
- Kathleen Dillon (1898–1980), British theatre designer
- Keir Dillon (born 1977), American snowboarder
- Kevin Dillon (disambiguation), multiple people
- Kirsty Dillon (born 1976), English actress
- K. J. Dillon (born 1993), American football player
- Kristine Dillon, American academic administrator
- Kurt Dillon (born 1994), Australian rugby league footballer
- Kym Dillon (born 1959), Australian television presenter

=== L ===
- Lawrence Dillon (born 1959), American composer
- Lee Dillon (born 1983), British politician
- Liam Dillon (born 1996), English professional boxer
- Linda Dillon (born 1978), Northern Irish politician
- Lisa Dillon (born 1979), English actress
- Lucas Dillon (disambiguation), multiple people
- Lucy Dillon (born 1974), British writer
- Luke Dillon (disambiguation), multiple people

=== M ===
- Marshall Dillon (cricketer) (1925–1979), Australian cricketer
- Martin Dillon (disambiguation), multiple people
- Mary Dillon (disambiguation), multiple people
- Matt Dillon (disambiguation), multiple people
- Matthew Dillon (born 1966), American software engineer
- Melinda Dillon (1939–2023), American actress
- Merton L. Dillon (1924–2003), American historian and author
- Mervyn Dillon (born 1974), West Indian cricketer
- Mia Dillon (born 1955), American actress
- Michelle Dillon (born 1973), British triathlete
- Michael Dillon (disambiguation), multiple people
- Millicent Dillon (1925–2025), American writer
- Myles Dillon (1900–1972), Irish historian

=== N ===
- Nicholas Dillon (born 1997), Trinidadian footballer

=== O ===
- Oliver Dillon (born 1998), English actor
- Olivia Dillon (born 1973), Irish cyclist
- Oskar Dillon (born 1999), Australian rules footballer

=== P ===
- Pa Dillon (1938–2013), Irish hurler
- Packy Dillon (1853–1902), American baseball player
- Patricia Dillon, American politician
- Patrick Dillon (1832–1868), Irish-American priest
- Patrick Joseph Dillon (1841–1889), Irish priest
- Paul Dillon (footballer) (born 1978), Irish footballer
- Peter Dillon (1788–1847), English merchant
- Phyllis Dillon (1944–2004), Jamaican singer

=== R ===
- Ricardo Dillon (born 1964), Argentine football manager
- Richard C. Dillon (1877–1966), American politician
- Ricky Dillon (born 1992), American singer-songwriter
- Robert Dillon (disambiguation), multiple people
- Ron Dillon Jr. (born 1975), American politician
- Rosie Dillon (born 1996), Australian rules footballer
- Ross Dillon (born 1947), Australian rules footballer
- Ryan Dillon (born 1988), American puppeteer

=== S ===
- Sandy Dillon, American singer-songwriter
- Sarinder Singh Dillon (born 1946), Hong Kong field hockey player
- Scott Dillon (1928–2018), Australian surfer
- Sean Dillon (disambiguation), multiple people
- Shaun Dillon (born 1984), Scottish footballer
- Sheila Dillon, British journalist
- Sheri Dillon, American attorney
- Sidney Dillon (1812–1892), American railroad executive
- Siobhan Dillon (born 1984), English actress
- Steven Dillon (disambiguation), multiple people
- Susie Dillon, Canadian politician

=== T ===
- Ted Dillon (1881–1941), English cricketer
- Terence Dillon (born 1964), British rower
- Terry Dillon (1941–1964), American football player
- Theobald Dillon (??–1624), Irish military commander
- Théobald Dillon (1745–1792), French Royal Army general
- Thomas Dillon (disambiguation), multiple people
- Tim Dillon (disambiguation), multiple people
- Todd Dillon (born 1962), American football player
- Ty Dillon (born 1992), American race car driver

=== U ===
- Una Dillon (1903–1993), British bookseller

=== V ===
- Veer Singh Dillon (1792–1842), Indian general
- Vince Dillon (1923–2005), English footballer
- Vincent Dillon (??–1651), Irish martyr

=== W ===
- Wayne Dillon (born 1955), Canadian ice hockey player
- Wentworth Dillon (1637–1685), Irish poet and landlord
- William Dillon (disambiguation), multiple people

== See also ==
- Viscount Dillon, an Irish peerage title
- Attorney General Dillon (disambiguation)
- General Dillon (disambiguation)
- Judge Dillon (disambiguation)
- Justice Dillon (disambiguation)
- Senator Dillon (disambiguation)
- Dillon (disambiguation)
- Dylan (name), including a list of people and fictional characters with the given name or surname
