= James Dillon =

James Dillon may refer to:

- James Dillon, 1st Earl of Roscommon (died 1642), Irish peer
- James Dillon, 3rd Earl of Roscommon (c. 1605–1649), leader of the Royalist forces in Ireland
- James Dillon (Australian politician) (1880–1949), Victorian State politician for the electoral district of Essendon
- James Dillon (bishop) (1738–1806), Roman Catholic Bishop of Kilmore, Ireland
- James Dillon (composer) (born 1950), Scottish composer often regarded as belonging to the New Complexity school
- James Dillon (Fine Gael politician) (1902–1986), Irish politician and leader of the Fine Gael party
- James Dillon (senator) (died 1955), farmer who served in the Senate of the Irish Free State
- James Dillon (officer) (c. 1600–after 1669), Irish Confederate officer
- J. J. Dillon (born 1942), retired American professional wrestler and manager
- James Dillon Armstrong (1821–1893), American lawyer, politician, and jurist from West Virginia
