= Marion O'Shea Roosevelt =

Irish writer (1850–1902)

- Born: Marion Theresa O'Shea; 1850; Nenagh, County Tipperary, Ireland
- Died: 10 April 1902 (aged 51–52); Atlantic City, New Jersey, U.S.
- Spouses: Robert Fortescue (died) Robert Roosevelt (m. 1888)
- Children: 3, including Granville

Marion "Minnie" O'Shea Roosevelt (1850 – 10 April 1902) was an Irish writer and the second wife of Robert Roosevelt.

== Early life ==
Marion Theresa O'Shea was born in 1850 in Nenagh, County Tipperary. Her parents were John and Mary Anne O'Shea (née Gill) of Summerhill, Nenagh. Her father was a journalist with The Nenagh Guardian. Her mother was a sister of the editor-proprietor of the Tipperary Advocate, Peter E. Gill, and the aunt of T. P. Gill. Her older brother John Augustus was a soldier, journalist and novelist, and her sister Elizabeth was a writer who emigrated to India. Another sister, Margaret (Mrs Kelly) (1854–1927) was noted as being fluent in a number of languages, and translated French works, and her brother Robert Gabriel (1854?–1882) was the London political correspondent for the Freeman's Journal.

== Personal life ==
Some accounts state that Roosevelt was married first to Robert Fortescue and widowed, others have stated that this was an alias of Robert Roosevelt, the uncle of Theodore Roosevelt, whom she later married on 14 August 1888. They had three children who were referred to as Robert's stepchildren:

- Kenyon Fortescue (1871–1939), who became an attorney.
- Major Granville Roland "Rolly" Fortescue (1875–1952), who married Grace Hubbard Bell (1883–1979), niece of Alexander Graham Bell.
- Maude Fortescue (1880–1961), who married Ernest William Sutton Pickhardt in 1900 and moved to London. Pickhardt was the son of Manhattan millionaire Ernest W. Pickhardt and the brother of Baroness Irene von Colberg. They divorced before Pickhardt's suicide in 1909. In 1945, she married Brigadier General Richard L. A. Pennington.

Roosevelt published articles and poems in American journals. She died on 10 April 1902 in Atlantic City.
