= Charles Dillon =

Charles Dillon may refer to:

- Charles Dillon (actor-manager) (1819–1881), English actor-manager
- Charles Dillon, 10th Viscount Dillon
- Charles Dillon, 12th Viscount Dillon (1745–1813), Member of Parliament for Westbury, 1770
- Charles Dillon, 14th Viscount Dillon (1810–1865)
- Charles Dillon (designer) (died 1982), British designer
- Charles Hall Dillon (1853–1929), member of the United States House of Representatives
- Charles Dillon (American football) (born 1986), American football player
- Charles Dillon (administrator), see List of administrators of the French protectorate of Annam

== See also ==
- Viscount Dillon
- Dillon (surname)
