= Wentworth Dillon, 4th Earl of Roscommon =

Irish earl and poet (1637–1685)

Wentworth Dillon
- Earl of Roscommon
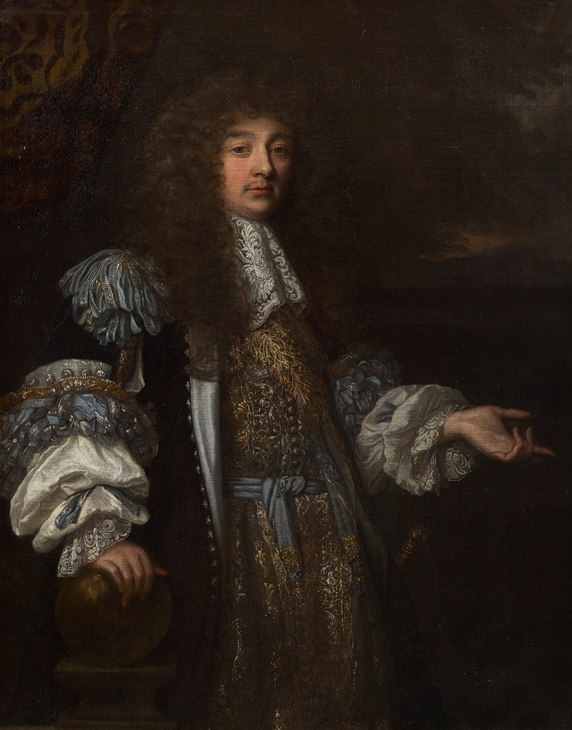
- Tenure: 1649–1685
- Predecessor: James, 3rd Earl of Roscommon
- Successor: Carey, 5th Earl of Roscommon
- Born: October 1637
- Died: 18 January 1685 (aged 47)
- Spouses: Frances Boyle, Isabella Boynton
- Issue: childless
- Father: James, 3rd Earl of Roscommon
- Mother: Elizabeth Wentworth

Wentworth Dillon, 4th Earl of Roscommon (1637–1685), was an Anglo-Irish soldier and poet.

Family tree

Wentworth Dillon with his two wives, his parents, and other selected relatives. (Note: This family tree is partly derived from the Roscommon pedigree in Cokayne.) Both his marriages were childless.

James; 1st Earl d. 1641	Eleanor; Barnewall d. 1628
Margaret; Barry	Robert; 2nd Earl d. 1642	Ann; Strode;
James; 3rd Earl c. 1605 – 1649	Elizabeth; Wentworth;	Carey; 5th Earl; 1627–1689
Frances; Boyle	Wentworth; 4th Earl; 1637–1685	Isabella; Boynton d. 1721	Robert; 6th Earl d. 1715
Robert; 7th Earl d. 1721	Angel; Ingoldsby;	James; 8th Earl d. 1746 unmarried

Legend

XXX	Subject of the article	XXX	Earls of Roscommon

== Birth and origins ==
Wentworth was born in October 1637 (Note: Gillespie (2004) and Lunney (2009) give his birth as "October 1637", but Cousin (1910) and Wills (1841) give it as 1633.) in Dublin, probably in St George's Lane. He was the only son of James Dillon, 3rd Earl of Roscommon, and Elizabeth Wentworth. His father was the 3nd Earl of Roscommon. He had conformed to the established church. Wentworth's mother was English, a sister of Thomas Wentworth, Earl of Strafford, who was therefore his uncle. Strafford was viceroy at the time of Wentworth's birth.

== Early life ==
As a young child he was educated by a tutor at Wentworth Woodhouse, his uncle Thomas's family seat in South Yorkshire. Later he was sent to Caen in Normandy, where a Calvinist academy or university existed at that time and where Wentworth is supposed to have been taught by Samuel Bochart.

His father died accidentally in Limerick in 1649: according to family tradition Wentworth, who was at Caen at the time, exclaimed "My father is dead!" at the moment it happened, two weeks before the news could have reached him. He therefore succeeded his father as the 4th Earl of Roscommon.

Roscommon, as he now was, travelled in Italy and studied at Rome. He returned from Italy to London at the Restoration. He was well received at court.

== Marriages ==
Roscommon married twice. Both marriages were childless.

In April 1662 he married Frances, widow of Colonel Francis Courtenay, 3rd Baronet (died 1660), and daughter of Richard Boyle, 1st Earl of Burlington, who was also 2nd Earl of Cork.

On 10 November 1674 he married Isabella Boynton. She outlived him and died in 1721.

== Career ==
In 1649 he had succeeded to the Earldom of Roscommon, which had been created in 1622 for his great-grandfather, James Dillon; and he was now put in possession by an act of the Irish Parliament of all the lands owned by his family before the Civil War. As Captain of the Gentlemen Pensioners he found abundant opportunity to indulge the love of gambling, which appears to have been his only vice. He fought a number of duels, but unlike his uncle Carey, later the 5th Earl, he is not known to have killed any of his opponents. Disputes with Lord Robartes, the Lord Privy Seal, about his Irish estates necessitated his presence in Ireland, where he gave proof of some eloquence in debate, and of some business capacity. On his return to London, he was made Master of the Horse to the Duchess of York.

In 1671 Roscommon raised an Irish regiment for French service in the Franco-Dutch War (1672–1678). He went with it to France, but the French disbanded it in 1672 and he returned to Ireland.

Roscommon's reputation as a didactic writer and critic rests on his blank verse translation of Horace's Ars Poetica (1680) and his Essay on Translated Verse (1684). The essay contained the first definite enunciation of the principles of poetic diction, which were to be fully developed in the reign of Queen Anne. Roscommon, who was fastidious in his notions of dignified writing, was himself a very correct writer, and quite free from the indecencies of his contemporaries. Alexander Pope, who seems to have learnt something from his carefully balanced phrases and the regular cadence of his verse, says that "In all Charles's days, Roscommon only boasts unspotted bays"; in his An Essay on Criticism, when Pope lists poets he admires, beginning from the classical age, Roscommon is one of two British poets he includes (William Walsh is the other).

Roscommon believed that a low code of morals was necessarily followed by a corresponding degradation in literature, and he insists that sincerity and sympathy with the subject in hand are essential qualities in the poet. This elevated conception of his art is in itself no small merit. He has, moreover, the distinction of having been the first critic to avow his admiration for Milton's Paradise Lost. Roscommon formed a small literary society that he hoped to develop into an academy with authority to formulate rules on language and style, but its influence only extended to a limited circle, although it included such men of distinction as John Dryden and George Savile, 1st Marquess of Halifax, the scheme fell through after its promoter's death.

== Death, succession, and timeline ==
Roscommon died on 18 January 1685 in his house at St James, Westminster and was buried in Westminster Abbey. The title passed to his uncle, Carey Dillon, 5th Earl of Roscommon (1627–1689), the "Colonel Dillon" of the Diary of Samuel Pepys. In 1746, on the death of James, the 8th earl, it passed to Robert Dillon (died 1770), a descendant of the first earl. His family became extinct in 1816, and in 1828 Michael James Robert Dillon, another descendant of the 1st Earl, established his right to the earldom before the House of Lords. When he died in May 1850, the title became extinct.

Timeline
Age	Date	Event
0	1637, Oct	Born, probably in St George's Lane, Dublin
3	1641, 12 May	Strafford beheaded
7	1649, 30 Jan	King Charles I beheaded
11	1649, 15 Aug	Oliver Cromwell landed in Dublin.
18	1660, 29 May	Restoration of King Charles II
24	1662, Apr	Married Frances, widow Courtenay, née Boyle.
37	1674, 10 Nov	Married Isabella Boynton.
42–43	1680	Ars Poetica published.
47	1685, 18 Jan	Died in St James, Westminster, London

== Works ==
- Horace’s Art of Poetry (1680).
- Traitté touchant l'obéissance passive (1686).

Roscommon's poems were collected in 1701, and are included in Robert Anderson's and other collections of British poets.

== Notes and references ==
=== Sources ===
- Aubrey, John (1696). Miscellanies. London: Edward Castle. OCLC 1049629740.
- Burke, Bernard (1866). A Genealogical History of the Dormant, Abeyant, Forfeited and Extinct Peerages of the British Empire (New ed.). London: Harrison. OCLC 11501348.
- Chester, Joseph Lemuel (1876). Registers of Westminster Abbey. London: Private Edition. OCLC 1140248. – Marriages, baptisms and burials from about 1660 to 1875
- Chisholm, Hugh, ed. (1911). "Roscommon, Wentworth Dillon, 4th Earl of" . Encyclopædia Britannica. Vol. 23 (11th ed.). Cambridge University Press. p. 727.
- Coffey, Diarmid (1914). O'Neill and Ormond – A Chapter of Irish History. Dublin: Maunsel & Company. OCLC 906164979.
- Cokayne, George Edward (1895). Complete Peerage of England, Scotland, Ireland, Great Britain and the United Kingdom, Extant, Extinct, or Dormant. Vol. VI (1st ed.). London: George Bell and Sons. OCLC 1180818801. – N to R (for Roscommon)
- Cousin, John William (1910). A Short Biographical Dictionary of English Literature. London: J. M. Dent & Sons.
- Duke, Richard, ed. (1717). Poems by the Earl of Roscomon. London: J. Tonson.
- Fryde, Edmund Boleslaw; Greenway, D. E.; Porter, S.; Roy, I., eds. (1986). Handbook of British Chronology. Royal Historical Society Guides and Handbooks, No. 2 (3rd ed.). London: Offices of the Royal Historical Society. ISBN 0-86193-106-8. – (for timeline)
- Gillespie, Stuart (2004). "Dillon, Wentworth, fourth Earl of Roscommon". In Matthew, Colin; Harrison, Brian (eds.). Oxford Dictionary of National Biography. Vol. 16. New York: Oxford University Press. pp. 226–228. ISBN 0-19-861366-0.
- Johnson, Samuel (1912). Lives of the English Poets. Vol. 1. London: Oxford University Press.
- Lunney, Linde (October 2009). McGuire, James; Quinn, James (eds.). "Dillon, Wentworth". Dictionary of Irish Biography.
- Lodge, John (1789). Archdall, Mervyn (ed.). The Peerage of Ireland or, A Genealogical History of the Present Nobility of that Kingdom. Vol. IV. Dublin: James Moore. OCLC 264906028. – Viscounts
- Pepys, Samuel (1893). Wheatley, Henry Benjamin (ed.). The Diary of Samuel Pepys. Vol. I. London: George Bell and Sons. OCLC 503692830. – 1 January 1660 to 30 March 1660/1
- Wills, Rev. James (1841). "Wentworth Dillon, Earl of Roscommon". Lives of Illustrious and Distinguished Irishmen, from the earliest times to the present period. Vol. V. Dublin: MacGregor, Polson & Co. pp. 54–56.

Political offices
Preceded by The Earl Fauconberg	Captain of the Gentlemen Pensioners; 1676–1677	Succeeded by Lord Deincourt
Peerage of Ireland
Preceded by James Dillon	Earl of Roscommon; 1649–1685	Succeeded by Carey Dillon
