= Michael Dillon (disambiguation) =

Michael Dillon (1915–1962) was a British physician and the first trans man to undergo phalloplasty.

Michael Dillon may also refer to:

- Michael Dillon (I.R.S. revenue officer) (1922–1983), first I.R.S. revenue officer to be killed confronting a tax protester
- Michael A. Dillon (1839–1904), American soldier who fought in the American Civil War
- Michael James Robert Dillon, 12th Earl of Roscommon (1798–1850)
- Michael O. Dillon (born 1947), American botanist
- Mike Dillon (footballer) (born 1952), English footballer
- Mike Dillon (racing driver) (born 1965), driver on the NASCAR circuit
- Mike Dillon (musician), percussionist/vibraphonist, member of Critters Buggin and Les Claypool's Fancy Band
