= Michael A. Dillon =

American soldier during the American Civil War (1839–1904)

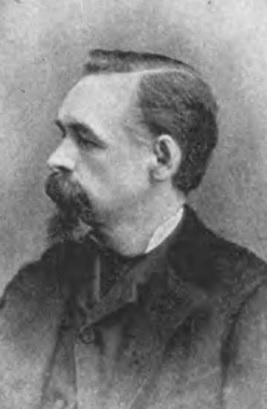
- Born: September 29, 1839; Chelmsford, Massachusetts
- Died: October 6, 1904 (aged 65)
- Military career
- Allegiance: United States of America
- Branch: United States Army
- Rank: Private
- Unit: 2nd New Hampshire Volunteer Infantry Regiment - Company G
- Conflicts: Battle of Williamsburg; Battle of Oak Grove
- Awards: Medal of Honor

For other people named Michael Dillon, see Michael Dillon (disambiguation).

Michael Augustus Dillon (September 29, 1839 – October 6, 1904) was an American soldier who fought in the American Civil War. Dillon received the United States' highest award for bravery during combat, the Medal of Honor, for his action during the Battle of Williamsburg in Virginia on May 5, 1862, and the Battle of Oak Grove in Virginia on June 25, 1862. He was honored with the award on October 10, 1889.

== Biography ==
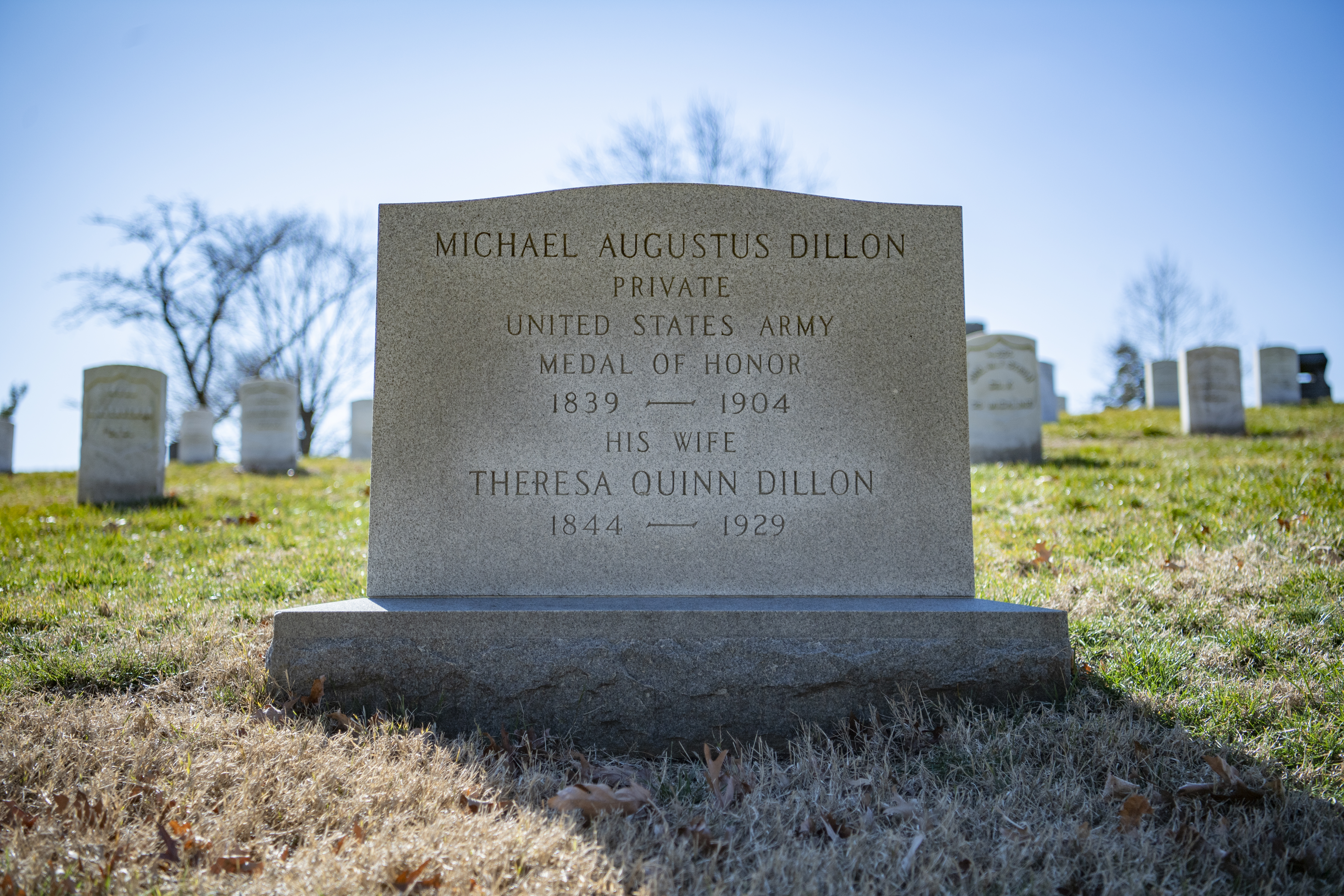
Grave at Arlington National Cemetery

Dillon was born in Chelmsford, Massachusetts on September 29, 1839. He enlisted into the 2nd New Hampshire Infantry as a private. He died on October 6, 1904, and his remains are interred at Arlington National Cemetery in Virginia.

== Medal of Honor citation ==
Bravery in repulsing the enemy's charge on a battery, at Williamsburg, Virginia At Oak Grove, Virginia, crawled outside the lines and brought in important information.

== See also ==
- List of American Civil War Medal of Honor recipients: A–F
