= Kevin Dillon (disambiguation) =

Kevin Dillon (born 1965) is an American actor.

Kevin Dillon may also refer to:

- Kevin Dillon (Australian footballer) (1924–1984), Australian rules footballer for Richmond
- Kevin Dillon (character), character from Rodman Philbrick's young adult novel Freak the Mighty and the film based on it, The Mighty
- Kevin Dillon (English footballer) (born 1959), English former footballer and manager
- Kevin Dillon (Gaelic footballer) (1941–2026), Irish Gaelic footballer
