= William Dillon (disambiguation) =

William Dillon (1877–1966) was an American songwriter.

William Dillon may also refer to:

- William Henry Dillon (1779–1857), British naval officer
- William G. Dillon, discovered planet
- Sir William Dillon, 4th Baronet (1774–1851) of the Dillon baronets

== See also ==
- Bill Dillon (disambiguation)
- Dillon (surname)
