= Robert Dillon =

Robert Dillon may refer to:

- Robert Dillon (died 1579), Irish judge
- Robert Dillon (died 1597), Irish lawyer, judge and politician
- Robert Dillon, 1st Baron Clonbrock (1754–1795), Irish politician
- Robert Dillon, 2nd Earl of Roscommon (died 1642), Irish peer
- Robert Dillon, 3rd Baron Clonbrock (1807–1893), Irish peer
- Robert A. Dillon (1889–1944), American screenwriter and film director
- Robert Sherwood Dillon (born 1929), United States Ambassador to Lebanon
