= Carey Dillon, 5th Earl of Roscommon =

Irish soldier (1627–1689)

Carey Dillon
- Earl of Roscommon
- Tenure: 1649–1689
- Predecessor: Wentworth, 4th Earl Roscommon
- Successor: Robert, 6th Earl Roscommon
- Born: 1627
- Died: 1689 (aged 61–62)
- Spouse: Katherine Werden
- Issue Detail: Catherine, Anne, & Robert
- Father: Robert, 2nd Earl Roscommon
- Mother: Anne Strode

Carey or Cary Dillon, 5th Earl of Roscommon, PC (Ire) (1627–1689) was an Irish nobleman and professional soldier of the seventeenth century. He held several court offices under King Charles II and his successor King James II. After the Glorious Revolution he joined the Williamite opposition to James and was in consequence attainted as a traitor by James II's Irish Parliament in 1689. In that year he fought at the Siege of Carrickfergus shortly before his death in November of that year.

In his younger days, he was a friend of Samuel Pepys, who in his Diary followed with interest Dillon's abortive courtship of their mutual friend, the noted beauty Frances Butler. The couple did not marry; Carey later married Katherine Werden.

Family tree

Carey Dillon with wife, parents, and other selected relatives. (Note: This family tree is partly derived from the Roscommon pedigree in Cokayne. Also see the lists of children in the text.)

James; 1st Earl d. 1641	Eleanor; Barnewall d. 1628
Margaret; Barry	Robert; 2nd Earl d. 1642	Anne; Strode
James; 3rd Earl c. 1605 – 1649	Elizabeth; Wentworth	Carey; 5th Earl; 1627–1689	Katherine; Werden
Wentworth; 4th Earl; 1637–1685	Robert; 6th Earl d. 1715	Margaret; Putt
Robert; 7th Earl d. 1721	Angel; Ingoldsby;	James; 8th Earl d. 1746 unmarried

Legend

XXX	Subject of the article	XXX	Earls of Roscommon

== Birth and origins ==
Carey was born in 1627, a younger son of Robert Dillon by his third wife Anne Strode. At the time of his birth, his father was the heir apparent of James Dillon, 1st Earl of Roscommon and held the courtesy title of Baron Dillon of Kilkenny-West. His father would succeed as 2nd Earl in 1641. Some time before that date his father had conformed to the established religion. His father's family owned substantial lands in Meath, Westmeath, Longford and Roscommon. The Dillons were Old English and descended from Sir Henry Dillon who came to Ireland with Prince John in 1185.

Carey's mother was English and a Protestant, a daughter of Sir William Strode in England and widow of Henry Folliott, 1st Baron Folliott in Ireland.

Carey seems to have been the only child of his father's third marriage, but he had half-siblings from his father's earlier marriages and his mother's earlier marriage. His father's first marriage had been with Margaret Barry, daughter of David FitzDavid de Barry, grand-daughter of David de Barry, 5th Viscount Buttevant and sister of David Barry, 1st Earl of Barrymore. His father's second marriage had been with Dorothy Hastings, fourth daughter of George Hastings, 4th Earl of Huntingdon and widow of Sir James Steuart. These four half-siblings are listed in his father's article.

His mother's first marriage had been with Henry Folliott, 1st Baron Folliott. Carey's half-siblings from that side are listed in the article about his mother's first husband.

Carey Dillon was a Protestant. His half-brother James, the 3rd Earl, was converted to the established religion by Archbishop Ussher.

== Early life ==
=== Thomas Wentworth, Earl of Strafford ===
In 1630; while Carey was a boy, his grandfather, his father and his eldest half-brother were staunch supporters of Thomas Wentworth, later Earl of Strafford, who was appointed Lord Deputy of Ireland in 1632. About 1635 Carey's half-brother James, later the 3rd Earl, married Strafford's sister Elizabeth. Their eldest son, the future 4th Earl of Roscommon, was named "Wentworth". Strafford, however, also had powerful enemies and was impeached by the English Parliament in November 1640 and after this failed, a bill of attainder was brought against him, which was passed in May 1641 and signed by the king on 10 May. Strafford was executed on 12 May 1641 on Tower Hill.

Carey's grandfather James died in March 1641 and was succeeded by his eldest son, Robert, Carey's father, as the 2nd Earl of Roscommon.

=== Irish War ===
The Irish Rebellion of 1641 broke out on 23 October 1641. The 2nd Earl of Roscommon died on 27 August 1642 in Dublin. and was succeeded by his eldest son James Dillon, 3rd Earl of Roscommon, Carey's halfbrother.

During the English Civil War, both Dillon brothers were staunch Royalists: James, who died in 1649, was posthumously listed in Cromwell's Act for the Settlement of Ireland 1652 as one of the leaders of the Royalist cause in Ireland who were excluded from pardon, and thus liable to forfeiture of their estates.

As a younger son with his livelihood to earn, in the war-torn Ireland of the 1640s and 1650s, a military career was an obvious choice for him: he was made a captain by the age of seventeen.

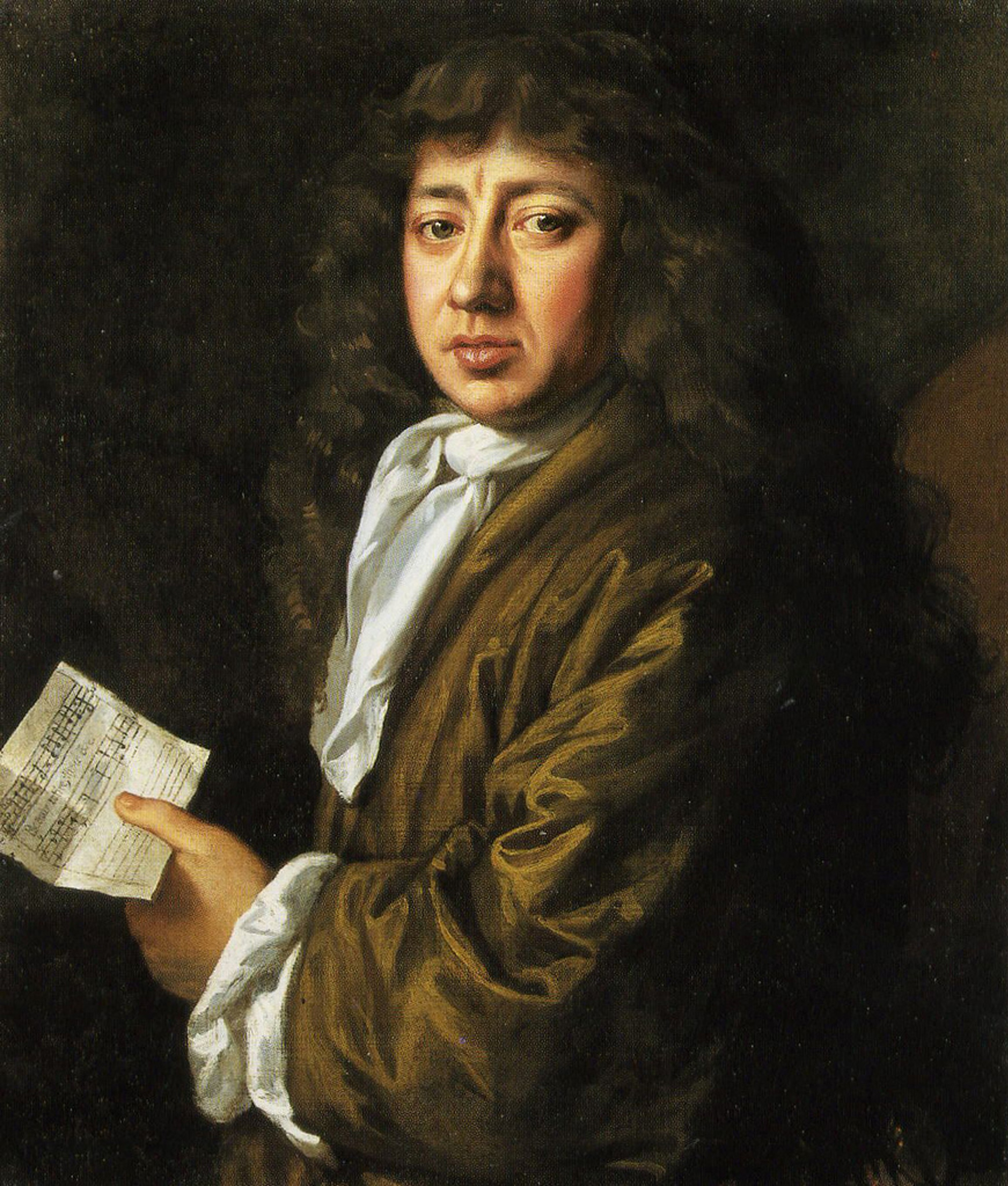
Portrait of Samuel Pepys by J. Hayls. Pepys was a friend of Carey Dillon in the 1660s.

=== Pepys's Diary ===
Samuel Pepys first mentions "Colonel Dillon" in his famous Great Diary in 1660. He evidently liked him, calling him "a very merry and witty companion". In the early 1660s one of Pepys's closest friends was a young clergyman called Daniel Butler (nicknamed "Monsieur l'Impertinent", apparently because he never stopped talking). He was probably, like Dillon, an Irishman. Shortly afterwards he went to Ireland, apparently at Dillon's urging. Pepys admired both of Butler's sisters, especially Frances (nicknamed "la belle Boteler"), whom he thought was one of the greatest beauties in London. Dillon courted Frances, and matters proceeded as far as an engagement, but this was broken off in 1662, apparently after a violent quarrel between Dillon and Frances's brother "Monsieur l'Impertinent", who complained of Dillon's "knavery" to him. In the summer of 1668 Dillon apparently renewed his proposal of marriage – Pepys saw him and Frances riding in a carriage together – but it seems that Frances declined his offer. It is not known whether Frances ever married.

Although Samuel Pepys always called him "Colonel Dillon" in his diary, he was apparently only a lieutenant until 1684, when he became a major, and subsequently a colonel.

=== Howard Duel ===
Following the Restoration of Charles II, Dillon entered politics, sitting in the Irish House of Commons as MP for Banagher in the Parliament of 1661–1666.

His career was almost ruined in 1662 when he acted as second to Colonel Thomas Howard (a younger brother of Charles Howard, 1st Earl of Carlisle) in his notorious duel with Henry Jermyn, 1st Baron Dover (Howard and Dover being rivals for the affections of the notoriously promiscuous Anna Talbot, Countess of Shrewsbury). Howard left Lord Dover for dead, and Dillon killed Dover's second, Giles Rawlins, a Gentleman of the Privy Purse to the Duke of York. Dillon and Howard fled from London, but later returned to stand trial. As was usual in affairs of honour, they were both acquitted, as killing a man in a duel, although counted as murder in a court of law, was then generally regarded as being expected of a man who wished to preserve his honour.

=== Political career ===
This check to his career was temporary, and after 1670 his rise in Irish public life was rapid. He was sworn a member of the Privy Council of Ireland in 1673, and also became Master of the Irish Mint, Commissary-General of the Horse of Ireland, Surveyor-General for Customs and Excise in Ireland, and a Governor of the Royal Hospital Kilmainham.

In 1685, on the death of his nephew, the poet Wentworth Dillon, 4th Earl of Roscommon, he succeeded as the 5th Earl of Roscommon.

=== Kilkenny affair ===
The following year Lord Roscommon, as he was now, clashed bitterly with Richard Talbot, 1st Earl of Tyrconnell, the rising Roman Catholic Royal favourite. Tyrconnell, as Lieutenant-General of the Irish Army, had removed all the Protestant officers of the regiment stationed at Kilkenny. Roscommon, with it seems considerable justification, challenged his legal right to do so, and when the matter came before the Lord Lieutenant of Ireland, Lord Clarendon, Roscommon called Tyrconnell a liar to his face: this was a shrewd blow since Tyrconnell had the unfortunate nickname "Lying Dick Talbot". The "Kilkenny affair" caused something of a furore in Ireland, but did not damage Tyrconnell's standing at the English Court.

== Marriage and children ==
He married Katherine Werden (died 1683), daughter of John Werden (died 1646) of Chester and Katherine Dutton, daughter of Edward Dutton, and sister of Lieutenant-General Robert Werden.

Carey and Katherine had a son:

1. Robert (died 1715), who succeeded him as the 6th Earl of Roscommon, and is said to still have been a young child when his father died

—and two daughters:

1. Anne, who married Sir Thomas Nugent in about 1675
2. Catherine (died 1674), who married Hugh Montgomery, 2nd Earl of Mount Alexander

The sisters were so many years older than their brother that it is possible they were children of an earlier marriage. If so, their mother must have died before 1660, since it is clear from the Diary of Samuel Pepys that Dillon was free to marry between 1660 and 1668.

== Williamite ==
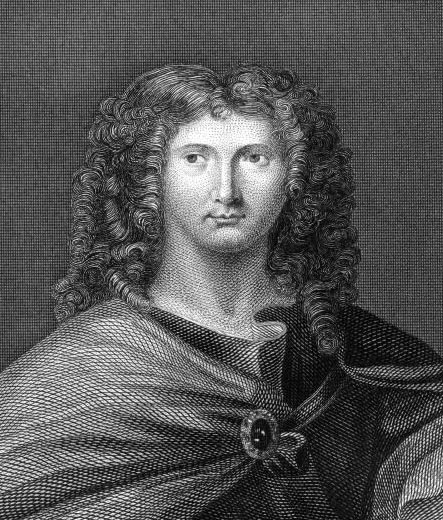
Carey's nephew, Wentworth, 4th Earl of Roscommon

Having served the Stuart dynasty with notable loyalty both during the Civil War and after the Restoration, Lord Roscommon, like many of the Irish Protestant ruling class, changed sides after the downfall and flight to France of James II in 1688. Roscommon and the majority of his fellow peers were opposed to James's pro-Catholic policy, and were appalled at the mishandling of the economy by Tyrconnell, the Lord Deputy of Ireland, with whom Roscommon had a bitter personal feud as well. When James, in 1689, attempted to reconquer England by occupying Ireland, Roscommon offered his services to King William III of England. He was commissioned to raise a regiment on William's behalf. He was attainted for treason by the Patriot Parliament, which was held in Dublin from 7 May to 20 July 1689. He was present at the Siege of Carrickfergus, which was defended by Charles MacCarthy More. The surrender of the town and castle on 28 August 1689, was the crucial first step in William's campaign to wrest control of Ireland from James II during the Williamite War in Ireland.

== Death and timeline ==
He left Ireland and died on 25 November 1689 in Chester.

Timeline
Age	Date	Event
0	1627, Jun	Born.
4	12 Jan 1632	Thomas Wentworth, later Earl of Strafford, appointed Lord Deputy of Ireland
13	12 May 1641	Strafford beheaded.
13	Mar 1641	His father succeeded his grandfather as the 2nd Earl of Roscommon
14	23 Oct 1641	Outbreak of the Rebellion
16	13 Nov 1643	James Butler, 1st Marquess of Ormond appointed Lord Lieutenant of Ireland
21	30 Jan 1649	King Charles I beheaded.
22	Oct 1649	Became heir presumptive as his nephew Wentworth succeeded as the 4th Lord Roscommon.
33	19 Apr 1661	Returned MP for Banagher.
35	19 Aug 1662	Acted as a second to Colonel Thomas Howard in his duel with Jermyn and killed Jermyn's second.
45–46	1673	Invested as an Irish private councillor.
56	20 Jan 1684	Succeeded his nephew Wentworth as the 5th Earl of Roscommon
57	6 Feb 1685	Accession of King James II, succeeding King Charles II
62	25 Nov 1689	Died in Chester.

== Notes and references ==
=== Sources ===
- Asch, Ronald G. (2004). "Wentworth, Thomas, first earl of Strafford (1593–1641)". In Matthew, Colin; Harrison, Brian (eds.). Oxford Dictionary of National Biography. Vol. 56. New York: Oxford University Press. pp. 142–157. ISBN 0-19-861408-X.
- Bagwell, Richard (1916). Ireland under the Stuarts and under the Interregnum. Vol. III. London: Longmans, Green, and Co. OCLC 458582656. – 1660 to 1690
- Bryant, Arthur (1947). Samuel Pepys – The Man in the Making. London: Collins. OCLC 758269937.
- Burke, John (1832). A General and Heraldic Dictionary of the Peerage and Baronetage of the British Empire. Vol. II (4th ed.). London: Henry Colburn and Richard Bentley. OCLC 39018719. – Ibbetson to Zouche (for Roscommon)
- Burke, Bernard (1883). A Genealogical History of the Dormant, Abeyant, Forfeited and Extinct Peerages of the British Empire (New ed.). London: Harrison. OCLC 499232768. – (for Dillon of Roscommon)
- Burke, Bernard; Burke, Ashworth Peter (1915). A Genealogical and Heraldic History of the Peerage and Baronetage, the Privy Council, Knightage and Companionage (77th ed.). London: Harrison. OCLC 1155471554. – (for Charles I)
- Cokayne, George Edward (1895). Complete Peerage of England, Scotland, Ireland, Great Britain and the United Kingdom, Extant, Extinct, or Dormant. Vol. VI (1st ed.). London: George Bell and Sons. OCLC 1180818801. – N to R (for Roscommon)
- Fleming, Thomas (1999). Duel – Alexander Hamilton, Aaron Burr and the future of America. New York: Basic Books. ISBN 0-465-01736-3. – (for the duel)
- Fryde, Edmund Boleslaw; Greenway, D. E.; Porter, S.; Roy, I., eds. (1986). Handbook of British Chronology. Royal Historical Society Guides and Handbooks, No. 2 (3rd ed.). London: Offices of the Royal Historical Society. ISBN 0-86193-106-8. – (for timeline)
- Hamilton, Anthony (1888). Memoirs of Count Grammont. Translated by Walpole, Horace. Philadelphia: Gebbie & Co. OCLC 1048777116.
- House of Commons (1878). Return. Members of Parliament – Part II. Parliaments of Great Britain, 1705–1796. Parliaments of the United Kingdom, 1801–1874. Parliaments and Conventions of the Estates of Scotland, 1357–1707. Parliaments of Ireland, 1599–1800. London: His/Her Majesty's Stationery Office. OCLC 13112546. – (for MP)
- Kenyon, John Philipps (1958). Robert Spencer Earl of Sunderland (1641–1702). Westport, Connecticut: Greenwood Press Publishers. ISBN 0-8371-8150-X.
- McGurk, J. J. N. (2004). "Barry, David fitz James, de facto third Viscount Buttevant (1550–1617)". In Matthew, Henry Colin Gray; Harrison, Brian (eds.). Oxford Dictionary of National Biography. Vol. 4. New York: Oxford University Press. p. 121. ISBN 0-19-861354-7. (for his father's 1st wife, Margaret Barry)
- Murray, Rev. Robert H., ed. (1912). The Journal of John Stevens Containing a Brief Account of the War in Ireland 1689–1691. Oxford: Clarendon Press.
- Pepys, Samuel (1893). Wheatley, Henry Benjamin (ed.). The Diary of Samuel Pepys. Vol. II. London: George Bell and Sons. OCLC 503692830. – 1 April 1661 to 31 December 1662 (for the duel)
- Pepys, Samuel (1896). Wheatley, Henry Benjamin (ed.). The Diary of Samuel Pepys. Vol. VIII. London: George Bell and Sons. OCLC 503692830. – 1 May 1668 to 31 May 1669 (for Frances Butler)
- Sergeant, Philip Walsingham (1913). Little Jennings and Fighting Dick Talbot: A Life of the Duke and Duchess of Tyrconnel. Vol. I. London: Hutchinson. OCLC 474495830. – 1643 to 1685
- Warner, Ferdinand (1768). History of the Rebellion and Civil-War in Ireland. Vol. I. Dublin: James William. OCLC 82770539. – 1641 to 1643
- Webb, Alfred (1878a). "Dillon, Theobald, Viscount". Compendium of Irish Biography. Dublin: M. H. Gill & Son. p. 149. OCLC 122693688.
- Webb, Alfred (1878b). "Dillon, Wentworth, Earl of Roscommon". Compendium of Irish Biography. Dublin: M. H. Gill & Son. p. 151. OCLC 122693688.
- Wedgwood, Cicely Veronica (1961). Thomas Wentworth, First Earl of Strafford 1593–1641. A Revaluation. London: Jonathan Cape. OCLC 1068569885.

Peerage of Ireland
Preceded by Wentworth Dillon	Earl of Roscommon; 1685–1689	Succeeded by Robert Dillon
