= Elizabeth O'Shea Dillon =

Irish writer

- Born: Elizabeth O'Shea; 1842; Nenagh, County Tipperary, Ireland
- Died: 1900 (aged 57–58)

Elizabeth O'Shea Dillon (1842–1900) was an Irish writer.

== Life ==
Elizabeth O'Shea Dillon was born in 1842 in Nenagh, County Tipperary. Her parents were John and Mary Anne O'Shea (née Gill) of Summerhill, Nenagh. Her father was a journalist with The Nenagh Guardian. Her mother was a sister of the editor-proprietor of the Tipperary Advocate, Peter E. Gill, and the aunt of T. P. Gill. Her older brother John Augustus was a soldier, journalist and novelist, and her sister Marion emigrated to the United States where she married Robert Roosevelt. Another sister, Margaret (Mrs Kelly) (1854–1927) was noted as being fluent in a number of languages, and translated French works, and her brother Robert Gabriel (1854?–1882) was the London political correspondent for the Freeman's Journal.

Dillon wrote a number of novels, including Sal o' the Wig which in 1869 was serialised in the Shamrock. Her 1884 Dark Rosaleen is considered her major work. It is a roman à clef about John Kenyon as the character Rev. John Kennedy. Kenyon was a close family friend of both the O'Sheas and the Gills. It was published under the name "Mrs J.J. O'Shea Dillon". Dark Rosaleen was serialised in William O'Brien's United Ireland. Sal o' the Wig also drew on the stories relating to Kenyon, with this book drawing on the tales about the priest's house keeper, Sara Kennedy.

She married Frederick William Dillon (born 1860), BL in 1883, and left Ireland to live in Nagpur, India some time after that. Her father-in-law was an official at the high court of Allahabad, India, Luke Dillon. She died in 1900.

== Works ==
- The bride of Raltard
- The last of the leprechauns
- Sal o' the Wig
- Dark Rosaleen (1884)
