= Earl of Roscommon =

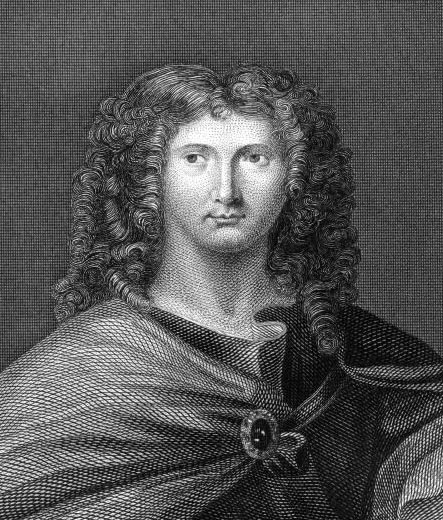
Wentworth Dillon, 4th Earl of Roscommon

Earl of Roscommon was a title in the Peerage of Ireland. It was created on 5 August 1622 for James Dillon, 1st Baron Dillon. He had already been created Baron Dillon on 24 January 1619, also in the Peerage of Ireland. The fourth Earl was a courtier, poet and critic. The fifth Earl was a professional soldier, politician and courtier: he was friendly with Samuel Pepys, who refers to him several times as "Colonel Dillon" in his famous Diary. After the death of the tenth Earl, there were two prolonged investigations by the Irish House of Lords during the 1790s to ascertain the legitimacy of his son Patrick, against the rival claim by Robert Dillon, a descendant of the seventh son of the first Earl and the next male heir in line. These eventually found in Patrick's favour. The titles became dormant on the death of the eleventh Earl in 1816. However, in 1828 the United Kingdom House of Lords decided that the rightful heir to the peerages was Michael Dillon, another descendant of the seventh son of the first Earl, who became the twelfth Earl. The House of Lords decided against Francis Stephen Dillon (d 1840), an inmate of a debtors' prison who dubiously claimed descent from the third son of the first Earl. The titles became extinct on the death of the twelfth Earl on 15 May 1850.

The Dillon family is a widespread Old English family that descended from Sir Henry Dillon who came to Ireland with Prince John in 1185. The Dillon family held substantial lands in Meath, Westmeath, Longford and Roscommon. This family has three noble branches: The Viscounts Dillon, the Earls of Roscommon and the Barons Clonbrock.

The line of the Viscounts Dillon is the most senior of the three noble lines. The line of the Earls of Roscommon departed from this senior line with James Dillon of Proudston, the third son of Gerald Dillon of Drumrany, whereas the senior line continued with Maurice, Gerald's eldest son Sir James Dillon (died 1507), great-grandfather of the first Earl, was a distinguished judge, as were several of his descendants. The senior line became noble on 16 March 1622, about six months before the "Roscommon" line. The branch of the Barons Clonbrock departed from the line of the Earls of Roscommon at a later point.

== Earls of Roscommon (1622) ==
- James Dillon, 1st Earl of Roscommon (died 1641)
- Robert Dillon, 2nd Earl of Roscommon (died 1642)
- James Dillon, 3rd Earl of Roscommon (c. 1605 – 1649)
- Wentworth Dillon, 4th Earl of Roscommon (c. 1630 – 1685)
- Carey Dillon, 5th Earl of Roscommon (1627–1689)
- Robert Dillon, 6th Earl of Roscommon (died 1715)
- Robert Dillon, 7th Earl of Roscommon (died 1721)
- James Dillon, 8th Earl of Roscommon (1702–1746)
- Robert Dillon, 9th Earl of Roscommon (died 1770)
- John Dillon, 10th Earl of Roscommon (died 1782)
- Patrick Dillon, 11th Earl of Roscommon (1769–1816)
- Michael James Robert Dillon, 12th Earl of Roscommon (1798–1850)
- Famille Gillion de Roscomont

== Sources ==
- Lodge, John (1789). Archdall, Mervyn (ed.). The Peerage of Ireland or, A Genealogical History of the Present Nobility of that Kingdom. Vol. 4. Dublin: James Moore. OCLC 264906028. – Viscounts
- Webb, Alfred (1878). "Dillon, Theobald, Viscount". Compendium of Irish Biography. Dublin: M. H. Gill & Son. p. 149. OCLC 122693688.
