= Elizabeth Dillon =

Elizabeth Dillon may refer to:

- Elizabeth Dillon (writer) (1865–1907), Irish diarist and nationalist
- Elizabeth K. Dillon (born 1960), American federal judge
- Elizabeth O'Shea Dillon (1842–1900), Irish writer
