= Arthur Dillon =

Arthur Dillon may refer to:

- Arthur Dillon, Count Dillon (1670–1733), Irish-born soldier in the French army
- Arthur Dillon (1750–1794), French-Irish soldier, grandson of Arthur Dillon (1670–1733)
- Arthur Dillon (1834–1922), French cavalry officer and Boulangiste, grandson of Arthur Dillon (1750–1794)
- Arthur Richard Dillon (1721–1806), French archbishop

== See also ==
- Dillon (surname)
