= Senator Dillon =

Senator Dillon may refer to:

- Charles Hall Dillon (1853–1929), South Dakota State Senate
- Gary P. Dillon (born 1943), Indiana State Senate
- Jimmy Dillon (born 1979), Pennsylvania State Senate
- Richard C. Dillon (1877–1966), New Mexico State Senate
