= Daniel Dillon =

Daniel Dillon may refer to:

- Daniel Dillon (basketball) (born 1986), Australian basketball player
- Daniel Dillon (footballer) (born 1986), English footballer
