= Matt Dillon (disambiguation) =

Matt Dillon (born 1964) is an American actor.

Matt Dillon or Matthew Dillon may also refer to:

- Matthew Dillon (born 1966), computer programmer and founder of the DragonFly BSD and HAMMER projects
- Matt Dillon (Gunsmoke), main character in the Western radio and TV drama Gunsmoke
- Matt Dillon (chef), chef and restaurateur in Seattle, Washington
- Matt Dillon, American infantry officer portrayed by Jon Hamm in the 2002 film We Were Soldiers

== See also ==
- Dillon (surname)
