= Little Ness =

Coordinates: 52.7717°N 2.8780°W

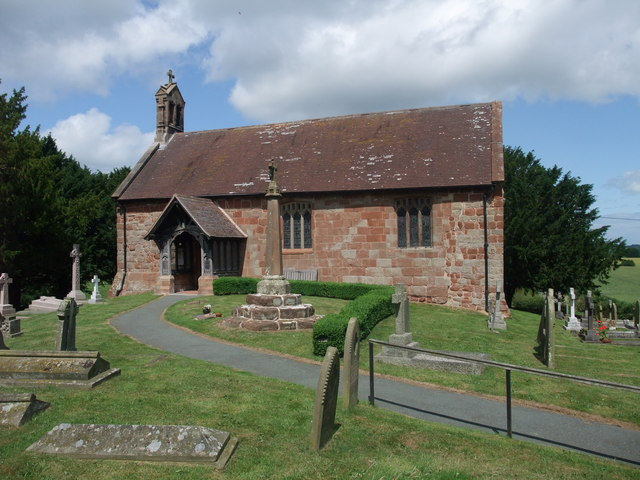
- St Martin's Church

- Location within Shropshire
- Area: 5.690 km^{2} (2.197 sq mi)
- Population: 374 (2024 estimate)
  - Density: 66/km^{2} (170/sq mi)
- Civil parish: Little Ness
- Unitary authority: Shropshire
- Ceremonial county: Shropshire
- Region: West Midlands
- Country: England
- Sovereign state: United Kingdom
- Police: West Mercia
- Fire: Shropshire
- Ambulance: West Midlands

Little Ness is a village and civil parish in Shropshire, England. It is about 7 miles from Shrewsbury. The parish contains the hamlets of Milford and Valeswood. The parish borders Baschurch, Bomere Heath and District, Great Ness, Montford and Ruyton-XI-Towns. In 2024 the parish had an estimated population of 374. There are eight listed buildings in Little Ness.

== History ==
The name "Ness" means 'Promontory'. Little Ness was recorded in the Domesday Book as Nesse. Newton Underwood was historically a township and chapelry in the ancient parish of Baschurch,

== Notable buildings ==
=== Church ===
Little Ness has a church called St Martin's Church. St Martin's Church is built on a mound. It was built in the 12th century as a chapel to Baschurch. It consists of a nave and chancel within one roof, with a bellcote at the west end, was remodelled in the 15th century and restored in Perpendicular style in 1877–78, with a north porch and vestry added. The circular font is Norman, as is the south doorway and there are some patterned mediaeval tiles in the chancel, which has a wide-shuttered reredos of 1878, said to have been perhaps designed by Norman Shaw when he was working at Adcote, and a rood added in 1927. There are mediaeval stained glass fragments including a head of Christ in the vestry, a window depicting the Adoration of Christ Crucified (1905) by Kempe, the east window, depicting Christ in majesty, erected in 1910, and war memorial windows to two men killed in World War I, Leonard Arthur (killed 1914), and Lieutenant Maurice Darby (killed at Battle of Neuve Chapelle 1915). The latter is buried in the churchyard, one of few Englishmen killed at the Western Front whose bodies were repatriated. The churchyard has the hexagonal steps and moulded base of a mediaeval cross.

=== War memorial ===
Within the village, at a T-junction, is an outdoor First World War parish war memorial in the form of a Portland stone crucifix on a Grinshill stone plinth. It lists men who died, including Maurice Darby, those who 'fought' and 8 who were 'engaged' (i.e. enlisted but did not fight).

=== School ===
Little Ness is the location of the independent girls' day and boarding school Adcote, within a late Victorian country house built by Richard Norman Shaw for the Darby family. The school was founded in 1907 and came to Little Ness in 1927 where it has grown significantly converting out houses and stables into classrooms. In 2014, the school announced plans to expand its boarding accommodation by over 100 beds and to develop new facilities on site, due to overseas investment that the school had received. When the school first came to Adcote it was filled to capacity of 72 boarders, it currently has 280 pupils, 120 of them being boarders. Adcote celebrated its centenary in 2007.

== Governance ==
In 1866, the legal definition of 'parish' was changed to be the areas used for administering the poor laws, and so Little Ness became a civil parish. In 1894 Little Ness became part of Ellesmere Rural District, in 1967 it became part of Atcham Rural District. In 1974 Little Ness became part of Shrewsbury and Atcham non-metropolitan district in the non-metropolitan county of Salop which became "Shropshire" in 1980. In 2009 it became part of the unitary authority area of Shropshire. Little Ness shares a parish council with Great Ness called "Great Ness and Little Ness Parish Council".

== Notable people ==
Conservative politician Derek Conway, while M.P. for Shrewsbury, lived at Little Ness in 1988.
