= Rosalind Hudson =

British codebreaker and architectural model maker (1926–2013)

- Born: 31 July 1926; Wirral, Cheshire, England
- Died: 7 July 2013 (aged 86)
- Education: Adcote School
- Occupations: codebreaker and architectural model maker
- Employer(s): Women's Royal Naval Service, Hut 8 at Bletchley Park
- Relatives: Walter Aubrey Thomas (grandfather)

Rosalind Audrey Clare Hudson (née Latham; 31 July 1926 – 7 July 2013) was a British codebreaker and architectural model maker.

== Early life ==
Rosalind was born at Wirral, Cheshire and was educated at Adcote School, Shropshire. In her early years she developed a love for architecture. Being the granddaughter of Walter Aubrey Thomas, who designed the Royal Liver Building, Hudson also constructed architectural models.

Hudson attempted to further her career in architecture at the Liverpool School of Art, but she eventually dropped out during World War II to join the Women's Royal Naval Service (WRNS). Hudson was stationed in Bletchley Park and Woburn Abbey for the duration of the war.

== Career ==
=== Bletchley Park ===
Following training in the WRNS she was sent to Bletchley Park, home of the British government's the Government Code and Cypher School. Hudson worked in Hut 8 under cryptanalyst Alan Turing. She never discussed her work at Bletchley Park following the war.

=== Florist ===
After the war Hudson trained as a florist under Constance Spry, and arranged flowers at Claridge's and the Savoy hotels. The Savoy gave her and her husband a suite overlooking the River Thames as a wedding present. Hudson worked as a florist for Somerset Maugham and his wife, the interior designer Syrie Maugham, and was an amateur pianist and watercolourist.

=== Architectural models ===
Hudson was most notable for her architectural models, being particularly attracted to Georgian architecture. Her works charted the development of the urban façade during the Georgian period.

Bath's Building of Bath Collection and Bath's Pump Room contain models made by Hudson. A scale model of Dulwich Picture Gallery made by Hudson stands in the gallery's foyer. Shortly after her death, a special exhibition of her work was held in 2014 at the Bath Museum.

Hudson made a model of Highgrove, the country house of Charles, Prince of Wales as a present for the Prince and Princess of Wales's wedding in 1981. Hudson was later commissioned by Charles to alter the model when he added a porch to the house. Hudson made models of other private houses, and was reluctant to accept payment for her models.

== Personal life ==
She met her husband, Richard Hudson in 1945. Hudson was serving in the Royal Marines, they married in 1949. They had three sons and two daughters and lived on a farm near Bath.

She died on 7 July 2013, shortly before her 87th birthday.
