= John Augustus O'Shea =

Irish soldier, journalist, and author (1839–1905)

- Born: 24 June 1839; Nenagh, Ireland
- Died: 13 March 1905 (aged 65); London, England
- Other name: "the Irish bohemian"
- Occupations: Soldier, journalist, author
- Known for: War correspondent

John Augustus O'Shea (24 June 1839 – 13 March 1905) was an Irish soldier, journalist and novelist.

== Biography ==
Born at Nenagh, Ireland, the son of journalist John O'Shea, in 1856 he was sent to study medicine at the Catholic University of Ireland in Dublin. Two of his sisters, Elizabeth and Marion, were also writers. Another sister, Margaret (Mrs Kelly) (1854–1927) was noted as being fluent in a number of languages, and translated French works, and her brother Robert Gabriel (1854?–1882) was the London political correspondent for the Freeman's Journal. Later that year he journeyed to London where he sought work as a journalist. He left to serve in Pope Pius IX's Irish battalion. During the 1860 siege of Ancona, he reported on the conflict for a newspaper in America. Following his military service for the Papacy, he was hired as a correspondent by the New York Herald and reported on the Austro-Prussian War in 1866.

In 1869 he was a special correspondent for the Evening Standard, for whom he went to France to report on the Franco-Prussian War. During the Siege of Metz (1870), he was arrested as a spy and nearly put to death. His life was spared through the intervention of other journalists and the French Emperor Napoleon III. He remained with the Standard for the next 25 years. During his career he reported on the Third Carlist War and the Bengal famine.

Toward the end of his life he became paralysed, followed by his death in London. He is buried at the St. Mary's Cemetery at Kensal Green, London. He was twice married and was survived by his second wife and a daughter.

== Bibliography ==
- Leaves from the Life of a Special Correspondent (1885), 2 volumes
- An Iron-bound City; or, Five Months of Peril and Privation (1886), 2 volumes
- Romantic Spain: A Record of Personal Experiences (1887), 2 volumes
- Military Mosaics: Set of Tales (1888)
- Mated from the Morgue: A Tale of the Second Empire (1889)
- Brave Men in Action (1890), with S. J. McKenna
- Roundabout Recollections (1892), 2 volumes

Selected articles

- "With the Carlists," The Catholic World (1884)
- "The Nosology of Regicide," The Catholic World (1885)
- "Delectable Seville," The Catholic World (1885)
