= Tim Dillon (athletic director) =

American athletic director

Administrative career (AD unless noted)
- 1990–1992: UNC Asheville
- 1992–1999: Alaska–Anchorage
- 2000–2005: Canisius

Timothy J. Dillon was the former director of athletics at Canisius College. He was hired in 2000 to replace long time Canisius athletic director Daniel Starr. During his tenure at Canisius, he made the decision to eliminate the school's football program in 2002, as part of an effort to overhaul and streamline the school's athletic department. Dillon resigned his position at Canisius in February 2005.
