= Adcote School =

Coordinates: 52.7691°N 2.8632°W

Adcote School for Girls

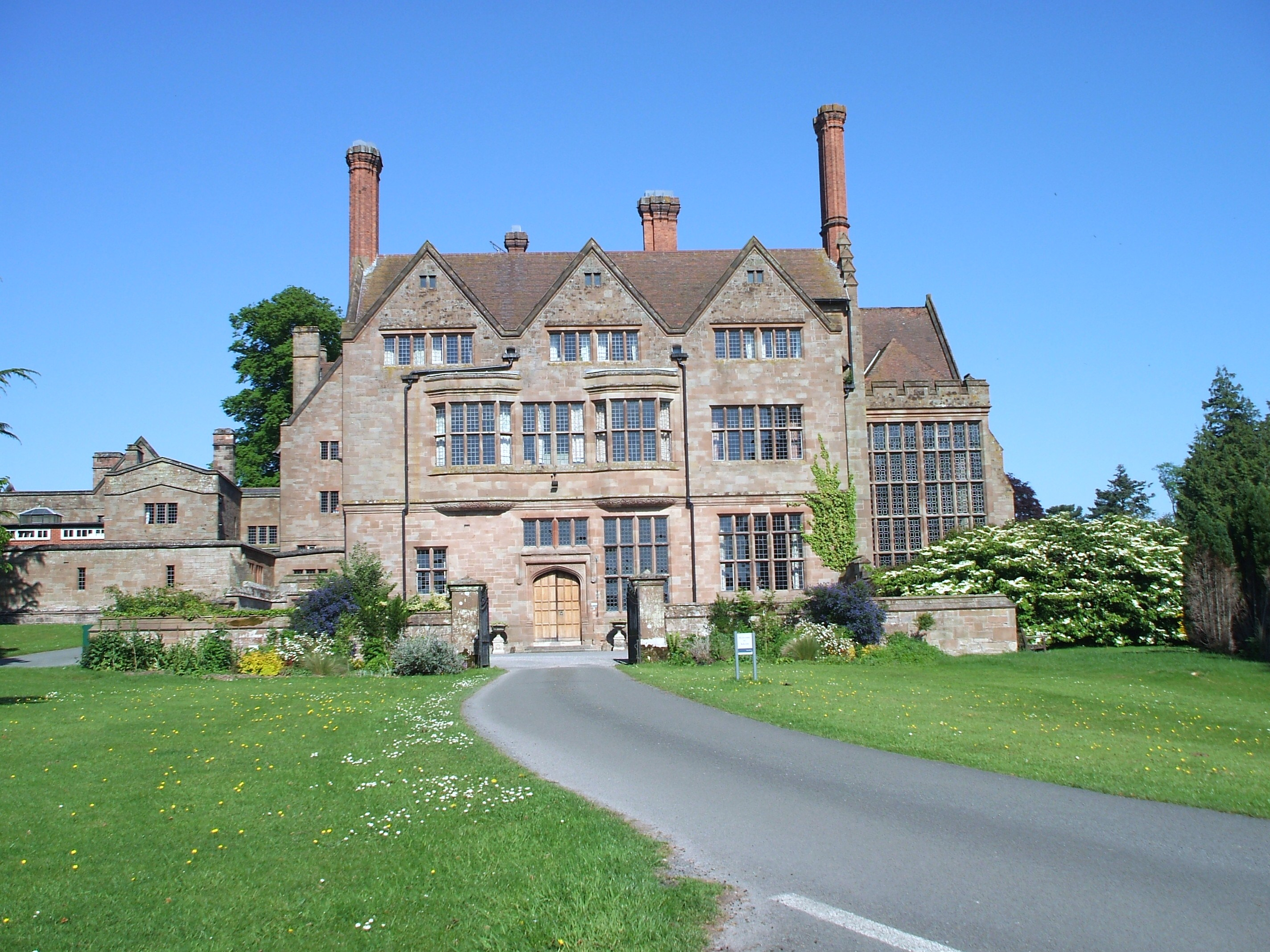
- Adcote School main building, built in 1879

Location
- Little Ness; Shrewsbury, Shropshire, SY4 2JY; England

Information
- Type: Private day and boarding school and [girls school]
- Motto: Latin: Nisi Dominus Frustra "Without the Lord, everything is in vain"
- Religious affiliation: Church of England
- Established: 1907
- Founder: Amy Gough
- Staff: 60
- Gender: Girls
- Age: 7 to 18
- Enrolment: 222 (80 boarders)
- Houses: Glenmore; Haughton; Innage
- Colours: Navy , Light Blue, White
- Former pupils: Adcotians
- Website: www.adcoteschool.co.uk

Adcote School is a non-selective independent day and boarding school for girls, located in the village of Little Ness, 5 miles (8.0 km) northwest of Shrewsbury, Shropshire, England. The school was founded in 1907, and is set in a Grade I listed country house built in 1879 for Rebecca Darby, the widow of Alfred Darby I (1807–52) and a great niece of Abraham Darby. The Darbys were the iron-master family who built Ironbridge. The school has a Junior School that takes girls aged 7 to 11, a Senior School for girls aged 11 to 16 and a Sixth Form taking girls from 16 to 19.

In 2016, the school transferred from a charity to a limited company status.

The school is a member of the Independent Schools Association (ISA) and the Independent Schools Council. On 26 February 2021, the school won the 'ISA Senior School of the Year Award'.

== History ==
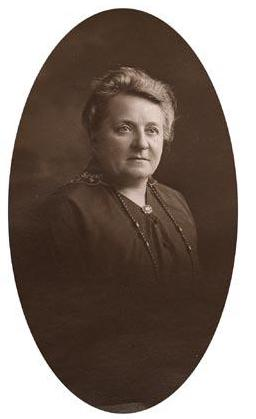
Adcote's Founder Mrs. Amy Gough

The school was founded on 18 January 1907 by Mrs Amy Gough, with two-day pupils and five boarders in Glenmore House in the village of Doseley near Wellington, Shropshire. The school grew quickly and the roll was thirty-one after two years. In 1915 the school moved into the larger Innage House in Shifnal. The numbers of boarders doubled and two years later a second boarding house was needed.

In 1919 the school moved again to a Georgian mansion in Shifnal called Haughton Hall, with room for 45 boarders and staff.

In 1926 the Old Girls Association was established. In 1927 a private company was formed for the purchase of Adcote in Little Ness.

By 1937 the numbers had risen again and the following year plans were drawn up to convert the stables and other outbuildings into classrooms, music rooms and laboratories. The Second World War halted the plans but another building, "The Mount", was taken up in Baschurch to accommodate another 16 children. By 1947 both schools were filled to capacity and waiting lists were in place until 1951. In 1954 the junior school moved to Aston Hall near Oswestry, which then returned to Adcote in 1968. The school continued to grow and the Adcote Educational Trust was established in 1964. From then until 2016 the school was administered by a board of governors.

In 2007 the school celebrated its centenary. Recent developments include the increased provision of ICT facilities, the refurbishment of the boarding accommodation and a new multi-fuel heating system for the school. The school roll has considerably grown in size in recent years, both in boarding and day pupils.

== Adcote Hall ==
The medieval 'vill' or settlement of Addecote has had a written history since Saxon times. The original name is probably 'Addancot', the cottage of 'Adda'. At the time of the Norman Conquest, the 'vill' formed part of the manor of Little Ness, which was given by William the Conqueror to his kinsman, Roger de Montgomery. In 1603 King James I, by letters patent, granted the manor of Little Ness, including Adcote, to the Protestant branch of the Howard family, Thomas, Earl of Suffolk, who in turn sold it to the Craven family. Adcote was divided up during the early part of the eighteenth century and was reunited by the controversial colonial figure – Clive of India. From Clive's will we learn that he had purchased the lands stretching from Baschurch to Little Ness. In 1850 Robert Clive's great grandson, sold his land to Henry Dickenson, of Coalbrookdale, who was married to Deborah Darby. In 1868 the property was conveyed to Rebecca Darby, the widow of Alfred Darby.

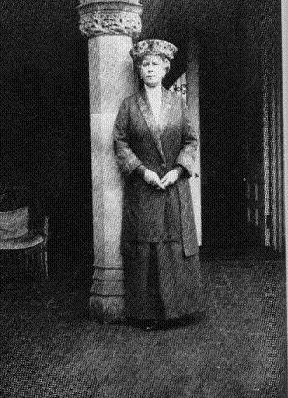
Queen Mary. Queen Mary was a regular visitor to Adcote

The house was designed by the architect Richard Norman Shaw RA to a Tudor design and stands in 27 acres (110,000 m^{2}) of landscaped gardens. Some local sources of inspiration for Adcote are thought to be Benthall Hall in Broseley and Madeley Court, the former home of the Darby family. It is thought that "Shaw himself regarded Adcote as his best house" It is also considered that the house is "perhaps the best example of the country houses built (by Shaw) between 1870 and 1880". Adcote House "has become famous mainly due to Shaw's autograph drawing A masterpiece of Architectonic drawing, it now adorns the Diploma Gallery, Royal Academy of Arts, London." Shaw designed Adcote in Tudor style and used the local building traditions to give the house a sense of continuity with the past The house is built of local sandstone with tall chimneys, pointed gables and mullioned and transomed windows. Its features include a Great hall with a Minstrels' gallery, William De Morgan tiled fireplaces and stained glass windows by Morris & Co., after cartoons by Walter Crane. The house was built for Rebecca Darby, the widow of Alfred Darby I (1807–52).

Alfred Darby II inherited the house from his mother. Alfred (1850–1925) was the final family link to Coalbrookdale: he was chairman of the company from 1886, until his death, and thus the Darby's long and illustrious history in the regional and national industrial revolution ended. His son, Lieutenant Maurice Darby was killed in 1915 during the First World War and is buried in Little Ness. In his memory in 2015, Adcote School opened the Maurice Darby Scholarships for five-day girls from Shropshire "able to display exceptional leadership skills", worth up to 100 per cent of fees.

Upon Alfred's death the house was sold to the Adcote School Trust. Adcote was converted to a boarding school in 1927. The original stable and coach houses have been converted into classrooms, science laboratories and the Junior School.

== Previous Headmasters and Headmistresses of Adcote ==
Years	Headmasters / Headmistresses
(1907–1946)	Amy Gough
(1946–1972)	Doris Gough
(1972–1978)	Mary Norman
(1978–1997)	Susan Cecchet
(1997–2001)	Angela Read
(2002–2004)	Robin Case
(2004–2007)	Deborah Hammond
(2007–2009)	Ryan Jervis OBE
(2009-2016)	Gary Wright
(2016–2023)	Diane Browne
(2023–2024)	Victoria Taylor
(2024–)	Nicola Tribe

Amy Gough and Doris Gough were mother and daughter.

In April 2016 Gary Wright left the school and the Acting Head for the Summer Term 2016 was Naomi Prichard.

Diane Browne joined the school as Headmistress in 2016.

== Notable former pupils ==
Former students of Adcote are referred to as Old Adcotians.

- Marit Allen (1941-2007), fashion editor and film costume designer noted for her work on the film Mrs Doubtfire (in which she reportedly based the mask worn by Robin Williams upon Adcote School's founder, Amy Gough)
- Barbara Hicks, actor
- Rosalind Hudson, Bletchley Park codebreaker
- Jane Dillon, designer, educator and artist

== See also ==
- Listed buildings in Little Ness
