= Listed buildings in Little Ness =

Little Ness is a civil parish in Shropshire, England. It contains eight listed buildings that are recorded in the National Heritage List for England. Of these, one is listed at Grade I, the highest of the three grades, one is at Grade II*, the middle grade, and the others are at Grade II, the lowest grade. The parish contains the village of Little Ness, the smaller settlement of Milford, and the surrounding countryside. The listed buildings consist of a church, houses and farmhouses that are basically timber framed, a country house and associated structures, and a war memorial.

== Key ==
Grade	Criteria
I	Buildings of exceptional interest, sometimes considered to be internationally important
II*	Particularly important buildings of more than special interest
II	Buildings of national importance and special interest

== Buildings ==
Name and location	Photograph	Date	Notes	Grade
St Martin's Church; 52.77341°N 2.87962°W		12th century	The church was remodelled in the 15th century and restored in 1877–78 when the porch and vestry were added. It is built in red sandstone and has a tile roof. The church consists of a nave and chancel in one cell, a south porch, and a north vestry. At the west end is a gabled bellcote with an apex cross. The south doorway is in Norman style and has a keystone carved with a beast's head, and the windows at the east end and in the south wall are Perpendicular.	II*
Cruck House; 52.78357°N 2.86194°W	—	14th or 15th century	The house is timber framed with cruck construction, and has been refaced or rebuilt in red brick. It has a slate roof, two storeys and an attic, probably three bays, and a one-storey lean-to at the rear. The windows are casements. In the right gable end is an exposed full cruck truss, and there are four full cruck trusses inside.	II
Lower House Farmhouse; 52.77162°N 2.87973°W	—	15th century	A cross-wing was added in the 16th century, and the farmhouse was much altered in the 19th century. It is basically timber framed with cruck construction, it has been encased or rebuilt in red brick, and has a slate roof. There is an L-shaped plan, the original hall range having one storey and an attic and three bays, and the cross-wing has two storeys and an attic and three bays. There is a gabled porch, and the windows are casements, most with segmental heads.	II
Milford Hall Farmhouse; 52.78245°N 2.86224°W	—	Late 16th or early 17th century	The farmhouse is timber framed with brick infill, some rebuilding in brick, and a slate roof. There are two storeys and an attic, and a T-shaped plan, consisting of a two-bay range, a two-bay west wing, and a two-storey rear wing. The gable ends have shaped bargeboards and finials. The upper floors in the gable ends are slightly jettied and the left gable end has an ornamental bressumer. Some windows are casements, some are cross-windows, and there is a square bay window, and a stair window. The doorway has a pedimented hood and a lean-to porch.	II
Church House Farmhouse and malt house 52.77168°N 2.88023°W	—	Late 18th century	The farmhouse is in red brick on a chamfered grey sandstone plinth, with bands, and a tile roof with parapeted gable ends, chamfered copings, and shaped stone kneelers. There are two storeys and an attic, and three bays. The central doorway has a moulded architrave and a gabled latticed timber porch. The windows are sashes, and above the middle window in the upper floor is a datestone. At the rear is a two-storey sandstone wing, and at right angle to this is a timber framed malt house.	II
Adcote and walls 52.76903°N 2.86354°W		1876–81	A country house designed by Richard Norman Shaw in free Elizabethan style, it was later used as a school. The house is built in red sandstone with some timber framing, and has tile roofs. The west (entrance) front has two storeys and attics, and three gables. In the attic and each floor are mullioned and transomed windows, in the upper floor two of them are canted oriel windows, and in the ground floor is a Tudor arched doorway. In the south front is an embattled full-height bay window, and a single-storey loggia, the east front contains a three-storey polygonal bay window, and to the north is a service range. At the front are forecourt sandstone walls that have two gateways with square piers and wrought iron gates, and at the ends are garden gates with Tudor archways.	I
Former stable block and courtyard walls, Adcote; 52.76972°N 2.86320°W	—	c. 1879	The stable block, designed by Richard Norman Shaw, is in red sandstone with tile roofs, and is in two blocks, the right block with two storeys and the left block with one storey and an attic. The right block has a two-bay arcade with chamfered segmental-headed arches, and above are two mullioned windows. On the left block is a square wooden cupola with clock faces, a cornice, and an ogee lead dome with a globe finial. To the right is a half-dormer with a hipped roof, and in the ground floor are two casement windows with segmental heads. To the left is a courtyard wall with chamfered coping, and a square gate pier with a concave pyramidal cap.	II
War Memorial; 52.77165°N 2.87807°W		1920s	The war memorial stands at a road junction, and was sculpted by Farmer and Brindley. It has a square plinth in Grinshill sandstone, and a shaft and cross in Portland stone. On the front of the cross is a crucifix and a lettered scroll. On the plinth are inscriptions, the names of those lost in the First World War, the names of those who fought, and the names of those who joined up but did not see active service.	II
