= Tim Dillon =

Tim Dillon may refer to:

- Tim Dillon (athletic director), American athletic director
- Tim Dillon (basketball) (born 1963), American basketball player
- Tim Dillon (candidate), American political candidate from Washington
- Tim Dillon (comedian) (born 1985), American stand-up comedian and podcaster
- Tim Dillon (All My Children), a fictional character from All My Children
