= Giles Rawlins =

English courtier (c.1631–1662)

- Born: ca. 1631
- Died: August 18, 1662; Pall Mall, London, England
- Occupation: Courtier

Giles Rawlins (ca. 1631 – 18 August 1662) was gentleman of the privy purse to James, Duke of York, and one of the original fellows of the Royal Society, elected in 1660. He lost his life in a duel in 1662.

== Life ==
Rawlins was one of seven sons and three daughters of Giles (a diplomat) and Anne Rawlins. He was probably born around 1631. His parents died in 1639 and 1642, and in 1653 Rawlins became the last surviving son and heir.

Rawlins grew up in Dublin, where his father had been posted, and returned to England in 1659. After the restoration he was gentleman of the privy purse to the then Duke of York, later King James II of England. Rawlins was known in London society, and is mentioned in Samuel Pepys diaries.

In November 1660, at the inaugural meeting of the philosophical society at Gresham College, the twelve attendees listed names of others who might be admitted to the society. Rawlins was proposed for election on 26 December 1660, and became one of the original fellows of the Royal Society. He left the society in February 1662..

== Death ==
On 18 August 1662, Rawlins was killed in a duel in Pall Mall, London. Rawlins and Henry Jermyn, a courtier, were set upon by Thomas Howard, brother of the Earl of Carlisle, and Carey Dillon, son of Baron Dillon of Kilkenny. While Samuel Pepys commented that nobody knew what the quarrel was about, it is likely that Howard was angered by Jermyn’s relationship with his lover, Anna Talbot, Countess of Shrewsbury.
