= Kevin Dillon (Australian footballer) =

Australian rules footballer

Personal information
- Full name: Kevin Dillon
- Born: 23 December 1924
- Died: 7 October 1984 (aged 59)
- Original team: University Blacks / Kew
- Height: 175 cm (5 ft 9 in)
- Weight: 77 kg (170 lb)
- Position: Defence

Playing career^{1}
Years	Club	Games (Goals)
1949–55	Richmond	88 (4)
- ^{1} Playing statistics correct to the end of 1955.

Kevin Dillon (23 December 1924 – 7 October 1984) was a former Australian rules footballer who played with Richmond in the Victorian Football League (VFL).
