= Charles Dillon (designer) =

British furniture designer

- Occupation: Furniture designer
- Spouse: Jane Dillon

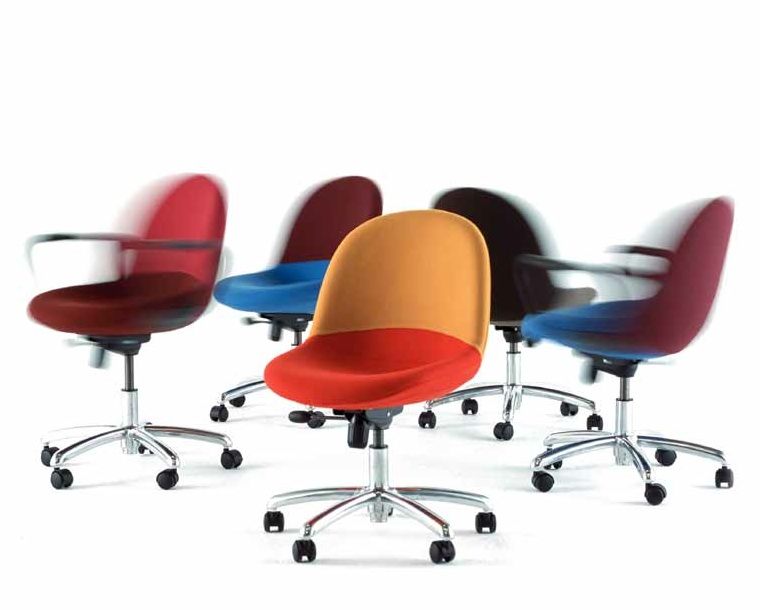
Jobber Chairs by Charles and Jane Dillon (1975)

Charles Dillon was a British furniture designer. He and his wife, Jane Dillon ran an international design studio between 1971 and 1982 making significant contributions to furniture design and lighting design across America and Europe. Their studio archives are held at the Victoria and Albert Museum.
