= Edward Dillon =

Edward Dillon may refer to:

- Edward Dillon (actor) (1879–1933), American actor, director, and screenwriter who was the brother of John T. Dillon
- Edward Dillon (American football) (c. 1885–1935), American football player and judge
- Edward Dillon (bishop) (1739–1809), Irish Roman Catholic Archbishop of Tuam
- Ted Dillon (1881–1941), English cricketer and rugby player
