= Steven Dillon =

Steven Dillon may refer to:

- Steve Dillon (1962–2016), British comic book artist
- Steve Dillon (baseball) (born 1943), American baseball player
- Steven Dillon (writer and professor), American author and Professor of English at Bates College in Lewiston, Maine
- Steven Dillon (hammer thrower), winner of the weight throw at the 1953 USA Indoor Track and Field Championships

== See also ==
- Stephen Dillane (born 1957), English actor
