= Justice Dillon =

Justice Dillon may refer to:

- Charles Hall Dillon (1853–1929), associate justice of the South Dakota Supreme Court
- John Forrest Dillon (1831–1914), associate justice of the Iowa Supreme Court

== See also ==
- Judge Dillon (disambiguation)
