= General Dillon =

General Dillon may refer to:

- Arthur Dillon (1750–1794), Kingdom of France general
- Francis R. Dillon (fl. 1960s–2020s), U.S. Air Force brigadier general
- Martin Andrew Dillon (1826–1913), British Army general

== See also ==
- Kanwal Jeet Singh Dhillon (fl. 1980s–2020s), Indian Army lieutenant general
- Attorney General Dillon (disambiguation)
