= Robert Dillon, 2nd Earl of Roscommon =

Irish earl (died 1642)

Robert Dillon
- Earl of Roscommon
- Tenure: 1641–1642
- Predecessor: James, 1st Earl of Roscommon
- Successor: James, 3rd Earl of Roscommon
- Born: unknown, estimated 1585
- Died: 27 August 1642; Dublin
- Spouses: 1. Margaret Barry; 2. Dorothy Hastings; 3. Anne Strode
- Issue Detail: James, Lucas, David; Henry; Carey
- Father: James, 1st Earl of Roscommon
- Mother: Eleanor (also called Helen) Barnewall

Robert Dillon, 2nd Earl of Roscommon PC (Ire) (died 1642) was styled Baron Dillon of Kilkenny-West from 1622 to 1641 and succeeded his father only a year before his own death. He supported Strafford, Lord Deputy of Ireland, who appointed him keeper of the great seal. Dillon was in December 1640 for a short while a lord justice of Ireland together with Sir William Parsons.

Family tree

Robert Dillon with two of his three wives, his parents, and other selected relatives. (Note: This family tree is partly derived from the Roscommon pedigree in Cokayne. Also see the list of children in the text.)

Lucas; Dillon c. 1530 – 1593; Chief Baron | Jane; Bathe
David Barry; 5th Viscount; Buttevant c. 1550 – 1617 | James; 1st Earl; Roscommon d. 1641 | Eleanor; Barnewall d. 1628
Margaret; Barry | Robert; 2nd Earl d. 1642 | Ann; Strode
James; 3rd Earl c. 1605 – 1649 | Elizabeth; Wentworth | Carey; 5th Earl; 1627–1689 | Katherine; Werden
Wentworth; 4th Earl; 1637–1685 | Robert; 6th Earl d. 1715 | Margaret; Putt

Legend

| XXX | Robert; Dillon | XXX | Earls of Roscommon | XXX | Viscounts; Buttevant |

== Birth and origins ==
Robert was born in Ireland, the eldest son of James Dillon and his wife Eleanor Barnewall. His father would in 1622 become the 1st Earl of Roscommon. His family was Old English and descended from Sir Henry Dillon who came to Ireland with Prince John in 1185. His family held substantial lands in Meath, Westmeath, Longford and Roscommon.

Robert's mother, who was also called Helen instead of Eleanor, was a daughter of Christopher Barnewall of Turvey House, County Dublin. Like his father's, her family was Old English.

Robert was one of 13 siblings, who are listed on his father's article.

== First marriage ==
In about 1600 Dillon married Margaret Barry. She was the sixth daughter of David de Barry, 5th Viscount Buttevant, (Note: Cokayne (1895) in error states that Margaret was a sister of David Barry, 1st Earl of Barrymore.) His wife's family, the de Barrys, were Old English like his own.

Robert and Margaret had three sons:

1. James (c. 1605 – 1649), succeeded as the 3rd Earl Roscommon
2. Lucas, died childless
3. David, died an infant

== Second marriage ==
About 1610, Dillon married secondly Dorothy, a Protestant, the fourth daughter of George Hastings, 4th Earl of Huntingdon, an English noble, widow of Sir James Stewart (died 1609), who was a son of Walter Stewart, 1st Lord Blantyre, a Scottish noble.

Robert and Dorothy had a son:

- Henry (died 1640), never married

== Advancements ==
Dillon had been studying law in London at Gray's Inn and was called to the bar in 1613. He was knighted on 15 February 1615 by James I at Theobalds House, Hertfordshire.

Dillon's parents as well as his first wife were Catholics. His eldest son, James, was originally raised as a Catholic. Dillon as well as his son James conformed to the established religion some time before his father's ennoblement. His father, however, remained Catholic.

On 24 January 1620 Dillon's father was raised to the peerage with the title "Baron Dillon of Kilkenny-West", in the Peerage of Ireland in a ceremony performed by the Lord Deputy Oliver St. John in the presence chamber of Dublin Castle on 25 January.

On 5 August 1622 Dillon's father was advanced to Earl of Roscommon. This made the title "Baron Dillon of Kilkenny-West" available as courtesy title for the heir apparent. Dillon, therefore was 1622–1641 styled "Robert Lord Dillon of Kilkenny-West" or "Robert Lord Dillon" fort short.

== Third marriage ==
Some time between 1622 and 1627 Dillon married thirdly Anne, daughter of Sir William Strode of Stoke sub Hamdon, Somerset, and widow of Henry Folliott, 1st Baron Folliott, who had died in 1622.

With Anne he had:

- Carey (1627–1689), became the 5th Earl Roscommon

== Later life ==
Dillon was appointed a privy councillor in 1627. Dillon's mother died in 1628.

During the Irish Parliament of 1634–1635 Dillon was elected on 5 July 1634 as one of the two MPs for Trim Borough. On 14 July 1634, his father took his seat in the Irish House of Lords.

On 26 May 1638 Dillon was appointed one of the keepers of the great seal.

Lord Deputy Christopher Wandesford died on 3 December 1640. On 15 December Charles I appointed Lord Dillon (i.e. Lord Dillon of Kilkenny-West) together with Sir William Parsons Lords Justices of Ireland, but Dillon was considered to have been too closely associated with Strafford and was replaced on 30 December. John Borlase was appointed as his successor on 31 December 1640.

During the Irish Parliament of 1640–1649 Dillon was on 13 March 1640 again elected as one of the two MPs for Trim Borough. While he sat in the Commons, his father again sat in the Lords.

His father died in March 1641 and Dillon succeeded as the 2nd Earl of Roscommon. He took up his seat at the Irish House of Lords on 1 August 1641. His seat in the Commons was filled by James Whyte.

== Death and timeline ==
Lord Roscommon, as he was finally now, died on 27 August 1642 in Oxmantown, a quarter of Dublin's Northside. He was succeeded by his eldest son James as the 3rd Earl of Roscommon.

Timeline
| Age | Date | Event |
|---|---|---|
| 0 | 1585, estimate | Born. (Note: The estimate of 1685 for his birth is based on his eldest son's birth 'about 1605' assuming that he was 20 at the time.) |
| 17–18 | 1603, 24 Mar | Accession of King James I, succeeding Queen Elizabeth I |
| 18–19 | 1604 | Sister Jane married Christopher Dillon of Ballylaghan, the heir apparent of Theobald Dillon, 1st Viscount Dillon. |
| 19–20 | 1605, about | Birth of his eldest son, James. |
| 24–25 | 1610, about | Married 2ndly to Dorothy Stewart, née Hastings |
| 34–35 | 1620, 24 Jan | Father created Baron of Kilkenny-West. |
| 36–37 | 1622, 5 Aug | Father elevated to Earl of Roscommon. He was styled Baron Dillon of Kilkenny-West. |
| 39–40 | 1625, 27 Mar | Accession of King Charles I, succeeding King James I |
| 42–43 | 1628, 11 Oct | Mother died. |
| 46–47 | 1632, 12 Jan | Thomas Wentworth, later Earl of Strafford, appointed Lord Deputy of Ireland |
| 48–49 | 1634, 14 Jul | Father took his seat in the Irish House of Lords. |
| 52–53 | 1638, 26 May | Appointed one of the Lord Keepers of the seal. |
| 54–55 | 1640, 15 Dec | Appointed as Lord Justice of Ireland together with William Parsons. |
| 55 | 1640, 31 Dec | Replaced by John Borlase as lord justice. |
| 55–56 | 1641, Mar | Succeeded his father as the 2nd Earl of Roscommon. |
| 55–56 | 1641, 12 May | Strafford beheaded |
| 55–56 | 1641, 1 Aug | Took his seat at the Irish House of Lords |
| 55–56 | 1642, 27 Aug | Died in Oxmantown, Dublin. |

== Notes and references ==
=== Sources ===
- Asch, Ronald G. (2004). "Wentworth, Thomas, first earl of Strafford (1593–1641)". In Matthew, Colin; Harrison, Brian (eds.). Oxford Dictionary of National Biography. Vol. 56. New York: Oxford University Press. pp. 142–157. ISBN 0-19-861408-X.
- Bagwell, Richard (1909). Ireland under the Stuarts and under the Interregnum. Vol. I. London: Longmans, Green, and Co. OCLC 458582656. – 1603 to 1642
- Burke, John (1832a). A General and Heraldic Dictionary of the Peerage and Baronetage of the British Empire. Vol. I (4th ed.). London: Henry Colburn and Richard Bentley. OCLC 39018719. – Abdy to Hutchinson (for Dillon)
- Burke, John (1832b). A General and Heraldic Dictionary of the Peerage and Baronetage of the British Empire. Vol. II (4th ed.). London: Henry Colburn and Richard Bentley. OCLC 39018719. – Ibbetson to Zouche (for Roscommon)
- Burke, Bernard (1883). A Genealogical History of the Dormant, Abeyant, Forfeited and Extinct Peerages of the British Empire (New ed.). London: Harrison. OCLC 499232768. (for Strafford and Folliott)
- Clavin, Terry (2004). "Borlase, Sir John". In Matthew, Henry Colin Gray.; Harrison, Brian (eds.). Oxford Dictionary of National Biography. Vol. 6. New York: Oxford University Press. p. 662. ISBN 0-19-861356-3.
- Clavin, Terry (October 2009). McGuire, James; Quinn, James (eds.). "Dillon, Robert". Dictionary of Irish Biography.
- Cokayne, George Edward (1895). Complete Peerage of England, Scotland, Ireland, Great Britain and the United Kingdom, Extant, Extinct, or Dormant. Vol. VI (1st ed.). London: George Bell and Sons. OCLC 1180818801. – N to R (for Roscommon)
- House of Commons (1878). Return. Members of Parliament – Part II. Parliaments of Great Britain, 1705–1796. Parliaments of the United Kingdom, 1801–1874. Parliaments and Conventions of the Estates of Scotland, 1357–1707. Parliaments of Ireland, 1599–1800. London: His/Her Majesty's Stationery Office. OCLC 13112546.
- Debrett, John (1828). Peerage of the United Kingdom of Great Britain and Ireland. Vol. II (17th ed.). London: F. C. and J. Rivington. OCLC 54499602. – Scotland and Ireland
- Fryde, Edmund Boleslaw; Greenway, D. E.; Porter, S.; Roy, I., eds. (1986). Handbook of British Chronology. Royal Historical Society Guides and Handbooks, No. 2 (3rd ed.). London: Offices of the Royal Historical Society. ISBN 0-86193-106-8. – (for timeline)
- House of Lords (1779). Journals of the House of Lords (PDF). Vol. I. Dublin: William Sleater. OCLC 35009219. – 1634 to 1699
- Lodge, John (1789). Archdall, Mervyn (ed.). The Peerage of Ireland or, A Genealogical History of the Present Nobility of that Kingdom. Vol. IV. Dublin: James Moore. OCLC 264906028. – Viscounts (for Dillon)
- Mahaffy, Robert Pentland, ed. (1901). Calendar of the State Papers Relating to Ireland of the Reign of Charles I. 1633–1647. Preserved in the Public Record Office. London: His/Her Majesty's Stationery Office Office.
- McGrath, Brid (1997). "Robert Dillon, Trim". A Biographical Dictionary of the Membership of the Irish House of Commons 1640 to 1641 (PhD). Vol. 1. Dublin: Trinity College. pp. 141–142. hdl:2262/77206. – Parliaments & Biographies (PDF downloadable from given URL)
- Paul, Sir James Balfour (1905). The Scots Peerage, Founded on Wood's Edition of Sir Robert Douglas's Peerage of Scotland. Vol. II. Edinburgh: David Douglas. OCLC 505064285. – Banff to Cranstoun (for Blantyre)
- Shaw, William A. (1906). The Knights of England. Vol. II. London: Sherratt & Hughes. – Knights bachelors & Index
- Smyth, Constantine (1839). Chronicle of the Law Officers of Ireland. London: Henry Butterworth. OCLC 1018312937.
- Warner, Ferdinand (1768). History of the Rebellion and Civil-War in Ireland. Vol. I. Dublin: James William. OCLC 82770539. – 1641 to 1643
- Webb, Alfred (1878). "Dillon, Theobald, Viscount". Compendium of Irish Biography. Dublin: M. H. Gill & Son. p. 149. OCLC 122693688.

Political offices
| Vacant Title last held by Richard Boyle, 1st Earl of Cork | Lord Justice of Ireland; 15 to 31 Dec 1640; With: Sir William Parsons | Succeeded by Sir Henry Tichborne; Sir John Borlase |
Peerage of Ireland
| Preceded by James Dillon | Earl of Roscommon; 1641–1642 | Succeeded by James Dillon |
