= Luke Dillon =

Luke Dillon may refer to:

- Luke Dillon, 4th Baron Clonbrock (1834–1917), Irish peer
- Luke Dillon, former Fair City Irish soap opera character

== See also ==
- Lucas Dillon (disambiguation), multiple people
