= Attorney General Dillon =

Attorney General Dillon may refer to:

- Lucas Dillon (judge) (died 1592), Attorney General for Ireland
- Robert Dillon (died 1580), Attorney General for Ireland
- Robert Dillon (died 1597) (1510s–1597), Attorney General for Ireland

== See also ==
- General Dillon (disambiguation)
