= James Dillon, 3rd Earl of Roscommon =

Irish peer (died 1649)

James Dillon
- Earl of Roscommon
- Tenure: 1642–1649
- Predecessor: Robert, 2nd Earl of Roscommon
- Successor: Wentworth, 4th Earl of Roscommon
- Born: c. 1605
- Died: October 1649; Limerick, Ireland
- Spouse: Elizabeth Wentworth
- Issue Detail: Wentworth
- Father: Robert, 2nd Earl of Roscommon
- Mother: Margaret Barry

Sir James Dillon, 3rd Earl of Roscommon (c. 1605 – 1649) was an Irish magnate and politician. He was born a Catholic but converted at a young age to the Church of Ireland. He supported Strafford during his term as governor of Ireland. In the Confederate Wars and the Cromwellian conquest he was a royalist. He died in 1649, but was nevertheless included as the fifth on the list of people that were excluded from pardon in Cromwell's 1652 Act of Settlement.

Family tree

James Dillon with wife, parents, and other selected relatives. (Note: This family tree is partly derived from the Roscommon pedigree in Cokayne. Also see the lists of siblings and children in the text.)

James; 1st Earl d. 1641	Eleanor; Barnewall d. 1628
Margaret; Barry	Robert; 2nd Earl d. 1642	Ann; Strode
James; 3rd Earl c. 1605 – 1649	Elizabeth; Wentworth	Carey; 5th Earl; 1627–1689	Katherine; Werden
Frances; Boyle	Wentworth; 4th Earl; 1637–1685	Isabella; Boynton;	Robert; 6th Earl d. 1715
Robert; 7th Earl d. 1721	Angel; Ingoldsby;	James; 8th Earl d. 1746 unmarried

Legend

XXX	Subject of the article	XXX	Earls of Roscommon

== Birth and origin ==
James was born about 1605 in Ireland, the eldest son of Robert Dillon and his first wife Margaret Barry. His father was the second Earl of Roscommon. His family was Old English and descended from Sir Henry Dillon who came to Ireland with Prince John in 1185. His family held substantial lands in Meath, Westmeath, Longford and Roscommon.

James's mother was a daughter of David de Barry, 5th Viscount Buttevant. Her family, the de Barry family is another Old English family. Her ancestor John Barry was created Viscount Buttevant by Richard II in 1385.

James was one of five brothers including two half-brothers, who are all listed in his father's article.

== Early life ==
His father's family was traditionally Roman Catholic, which is why his father, despite his record of loyalty to the Crown, was never fully trusted by King Charles I of England. James, however, was converted to the Church of Ireland by James Ussher, Archbishop of Armagh.

On 24 January 1620 his grandfather was raised to the peerage with the title of Baron Dillon of Kilkenny-West, in the Peerage of Ireland. in a ceremony performed by the Lord Deputy Oliver St. John in the Presence Chamber of Dublin Castle on 25 January.

On 5 August 1622 James's grandfather was further honoured by being created Earl of Roscommon. In consequence of this advancement, Robert, the heir apparent, James's father, was styled Lord Kilkenny-West, as a courtesy title from 1622 to 1641.

== Marriage and children ==
In late September or early October 1636 James Dillon married Elizabeth Wentworth, daughter of Sir William Wentworth and Anne Atkins at Lowton Hall, Essex. She was a sister of Thomas Wentworth, 1st Earl of Strafford, the formidable and (for a while), all-powerful Lord Deputy of Ireland. James's father was a staunch supporter and a personal friend of Strafford, and the marriage was clearly intended to strengthen English rule in Ireland through family alliances between leading English and Anglo-Irish families.

James and Elizabeth had a son:

- Wentworth (1637–1685), 4th Earl and a poet of renown.

== Parliament ==
Dillon was knighted before or in 1639 and thus became Sir James Dillon. The same year he stood as MP, or "knight of the shire" as county MPs were then still called, for County Longford in the Parliament of 1640–1649, (Note: Also called the "Parliament 1639–1649" because it opened on 2 March 1640, which date was still in the year 1639 according to the Old Style (O.S.) calendar, in force in Ireland at the time, as the year started on 25 March in O.S.) the second of Charles I. Sir James was elected as one of the two members for County Longford on 28 February 1640.

Parliament met on 16 March 1640. In its first session the parliament unanimously voted for four subsidies of £45,000 to raise an Irish army of 9,000 for use by the king against the Scots in the Bishops' Wars. Dillon must have voted in favour. On 31 March 1640 Wentworth prorogued parliament until the first week of June.

On 3 April 1640, Strafford (i.e. Wentworth) left Ireland, called to England by the king to help him manage the Bishops war against the Scots. Strafford appointed Christopher Wandesford as Lord Deputy to govern Ireland in his absence. Wandesford opened the second parliamentary session on 1 June 1640. News from England was the Short Parliament had refused subsidies to the king. The Irish MPs regretted having agreed to subsidies and wanted to sabotage their own action by making the subsidies difficult to evaluate and to collect. After two weeks of inconclusive discussions, Wandesford prorogued parliament on 17 June.

Parliament reconvened for the third session on 1 October. The House of Commons formed a committee for grievances that compiled a remonstrance (complaint) against Strafford. The remonstrance was then approved by the House of Commons. Sir James must have voted against it in order to support Strafford. Wandesford prorogued parliament on 12 November, a day after Strafford's impeachment in Westminster by the Long Parliament.

Parliament met again on 26 January 1641. Lord Deputy Wandesford had died on 3 December 1640 and the Irish government had devolved to the Lords Justice, Parsons and Borlase.

Table of sessions: Parliament 1640–1649
Sir James only attended the first five sessions of this parliament as an MP.
Session	Start	End	Remark
1st	16 Mar 1640	31 Mar 1640	Voted 4 subsidies
2nd	1 Jun 1640	17 Jun 1640	Trying to change how the subsidies would be evaluated and collected
3rd	1 Oct 1640	12 Nov 1640	Remonstrance voted
4th	26 Jan 1641	6 Mar 1641	Impeachment of Strafford and Radcliffe
5th	11 May 1641	7 Aug 1641	
6th	9 Nov 1641	9 Nov 1641	Adjourned on the same day
6th	16 Nov 1641	17 Nov 1641	Voted a protest against the rising
7th	11 Jan 1642		
8th	1 Aug 1642		
9th		14 Dec 1642	
10th	20 Apr 1643		

== Earl of Roscommon ==
In March 1641 James's grandfather died and his father succeeded as the second earl. His tenure was, however, a short one as he died on 27 August 1642 in Oxmantown, a residential quarter in Dublin's Northside. James succeeded as the 3rd Earl of Roscommon. He had to abandon his seat in the lower house and gained a seat in the House of Lords, which he took on the 17 November 1642.

Roscommon was in Dublin in July 1647 when Ormond handed the town over to the English Parliament and was given as a hostage to the English Parliament by Ormond. Roscommon returned to Ireland with Ormond sailing on a man-of-war sent by William II, Prince of Orange to Le Havre to carry them to Cork where they arrived on 29 September 1648.

== Death and timeline ==
He died at Limerick in October 1649, at the house of the Anglican Bishop Bramhall, of an accidental fall down a flight of stairs. According to legend, his son, then in exile at Caen, knew of his death at the moment it happened, although the official news did not reach him until two weeks later.

Timeline
Age	Date	Event
0	1605, about	Born.
14–15	1620, 24 Jan	Grandfather created Baron of Kilkenny-West.
16–17	1622, 5 Aug	Grandfather created Earl of Roscommon.
19–20	1625, 27 Mar	Accession of King Charles I, succeeding King James I
26–27	1632, 12 Jan	Thomas Wentworth, later Earl of Strafford, appointed Lord Deputy of Ireland
30–31	1636, Sep or Oct	Married Elizabeth Wentworth.
33–34	1639, 28 Feb	Returned as MP for County Longford.
34–35	1640, 16 Mar	Parliament opened
34–35	1640, Dec	Father appointed as one of the Lord Justices of Ireland.
35–36	1641, 12 May	Strafford beheaded
35–36	1641, Mar	Grandfather died and his father succeeded as 2nd Earl.
35–36	1641, 23 Oct	Outbreak of the Rebellion
36–37	1642, 27 Aug	Father died in Oxmantown, Dublin and he succeeded as the 3rd Earl of Roscommon.
36–37	1642, 17 Nov	Took his seat in the Irish House of Lords
41–42	1647, 19 Jun	Given as hostage to the English Parliament by Ormond
43–44	1649, 30 Jan	King Charles I beheaded.
43–44	1649, Oct	Died in Limerick.

== Notes and references ==
=== Sources ===
- Airy, Osmund (1886). "Butler, James, twelfth Earl and first Duke of Ormonde (1610–1688)". In Lee, Sidney (ed.). Dictionary of National Biography. Vol. VIII. New York: MacMillan and Co. pp. 52–60. OCLC 8544105.
- Asch, Ronald G. (2004). "Wentworth, Thomas, first earl of Strafford (1593–1641)". In Matthew, Colin; Harrison, Brian (eds.). Oxford Dictionary of National Biography. Vol. 56. New York: Oxford University Press. pp. 142–157. ISBN 0-19-861408-X.
- Aubrey, John (1696). Miscellanies. London: Edward Castle. OCLC 1049629740.
- Bagwell, Richard (1909). Ireland under the Stuarts and under the Interregnum. Vol. I. London: Longmans, Green, and Co. OCLC 458582656. – 1603 to 1642
- Beatson, Robert (1806). A Political Index to the Histories of Great Britain and Ireland. Vol. III (3rd ed.). London: Longman, Hurst, Rees, and Orme. OCLC 2228463. – Scotland & Ireland
- Burke, Bernard (1883). A Genealogical History of the Dormant, Abeyant, Forfeited and Extinct Peerages of the British Empire (New ed.). London: Harrison. OCLC 499232768.
- Carte, Thomas (1851) [1st pub. 1736]. The Life of James Duke of Ormond. Vol. III (New ed.). Oxford: Oxford University Press. OCLC 1086656347. – 1643 to 1660
- Clarke, Aidan (1976). "Chapter X: The Breakdown of Authority". In Moody, Theodore William; Martin, F. X.; Byrne, Francis John (eds.). A New History of Ireland. Vol. III. Oxford: Oxford University Press. pp. 270–288. ISBN 0-19-820242-3. – 1640 to 1641
- Cokayne, George Edward (1895). Complete Peerage of England, Scotland, Ireland, Great Britain and the United Kingdom, Extant, Extinct, or Dormant. Vol. VI (1st ed.). London: George Bell and Sons. OCLC 1180818801. – N to R (for Roscommon)
- Fryde, Edmund Boleslaw; Greenway, D. E.; Porter, S.; Roy, I., eds. (1986). Handbook of British Chronology. Royal Historical Society Guides and Handbooks, No. 2 (3rd ed.). London: Offices of the Royal Historical Society. ISBN 0-86193-106-8. – (for timeline)
- Gardiner, Samuel Rawson (1904). History of England from the Accession of James I to the Outbreak of the Civil War. Vol. IX. London: Longmans, Green & Co. OCLC 559091724. – 1639 to 1641
- Gerard, John (1913). "Chronology, General". In Herbermann, Charles George (ed.). Catholic Encyclopedia. Vol. III. New York: The Encyclopedia Press. pp. 738–742. OCLC 1157968788.
- Gillespie, Stuart (2004). "Dillon, Wentworth, fourth Earl of Roscommon". In Matthew, Colin; Harrison, Brian (eds.). Oxford Dictionary of National Biography. Vol. 16. New York: Oxford University Press. pp. 226–228. ISBN 0-19-861366-0.
- House of Commons (1878). Return. Members of Parliament – Part II. Parliaments of Great Britain, 1705–1796. Parliaments of the United Kingdom, 1801–1874. Parliaments and Conventions of the Estates of Scotland, 1357–1707. Parliaments of Ireland, 1599–1800. London: His/Her Majesty's Stationery Office. OCLC 13112546. (for the subject as MP)
- House of Lords (1779). Journals of the House of Lords (PDF). Vol. I. Dublin: William Sleater. OCLC 35009219. – 1634 to 1699
- Kearney, Hugh Francis (1959). Strafford in Ireland 1633–1641 – a Study in Absolutism. Manchester: Manchester University Press. OCLC 857142293.
- King, Bruce (1982). Seventeenth Century English Literature. New York: Schocken books. ISBN 0-8052-0771-6.
- Lodge, John (1789). Archdall, Mervyn (ed.). The Peerage of Ireland or, A Genealogical History of the Present Nobility of that Kingdom. Vol. IV. Dublin: James Moore. OCLC 264906028. – Viscounts (for Dillon)
- Meehan, Rev. Charles Patrick (1882). The Confederation of Kilkenny (New revised and enlarged ed.). Dublin: James Duffy. OCLC 224157081.
- Mountmorres, Hervey Redmond Morres, Viscount (1792a). The History of the Principal Transactions of the Irish Parliament from the Year 1634 to 1666. Vol. I. London: T. Cadell. OCLC 843863159. – House of Lords
- Mountmorres, Hervey Redmond Morres, Viscount (1792b). The History of the Principal Transactions of the Irish Parliament from the Year 1634 to 1666. Vol. II. London: T. Cadell. OCLC 843863159. – House of Commons
- Warner, Ferdinand (1768). History of the Rebellion and Civil-War in Ireland. Vol. I. Dublin: James William. OCLC 82770539. – 1641 to 1643
- Webb, Alfred (1878). "Dillon, Theobald, Viscount". Compendium of Irish Biography. Dublin: M. H. Gill & Son. p. 149. OCLC 122693688.
- Wedgwood, Cicely Veronica (1961). Thomas Wentworth, First Earl of Strafford 1593–1641. A Revaluation. London: Jonathan Cape. OCLC 1068569885.

Peerage of Ireland
Preceded by Robert Dillon	Earl of Roscommon; 1642–1649	Succeeded by Wentworth Dillon
