= Lucas Dillon =

Lucas Dillon may refer to:

- Lucas Dillon (judge) (1530–1593), Irish barrister
- Lucas Dillon, 6th Viscount Dillon (??–1682), Irish peer
- Lucas Dillon of Loughglynn (1579–1656), Irish politician

== See also ==
- Luke Dillon (disambiguation), multiple people
