= George Dillon =

George Dillon may refer to:

- George Dillon (poet) (1906–1968), American editor and poet
- George F. Dillon, 19th century Catholic writer and anti-Masonic conspiracy theorist
- Agent George Dillon, a Predator franchise character who worked undercover for the CIA
