= Ron Dillon Jr. =

American politician

Ronald Chaney Dillon Jr. (born 1975) is an American politician and former chairman of the County Council of Anne Arundel County, Maryland. Dillon is a Republican; he was elected to the council in November 2002 and re-elected in 2006, serving until his second term ended in December 2010.

Dillon is a CPA. He graduated from the University of Maryland, Baltimore County with a BA in economics. He worked for Arthur Andersen before returning to work for the family company, Dillon Bus Service. He works as the controller of the company overseeing its financial functions.

Dillon was 30 years old when he became county council chairman, making him one of the youngest county council chairmen ever.

Dillon lives in Pasadena. He is married and has two young children.
