= Karen Dillon =

Karen Dillon may refer to:

- Karen Dillon (journalist)
- Karen Dillon (filmmaker)
