= Thomas Dillon (disambiguation) =

Thomas Dillon (1950–2011) was an American serial killer.

Thomas or Tom Dillon may also refer to:

- Thomas Dillon, 4th Viscount Dillon (1615–1673), Irish peer
- Thomas Dillon (chemist) (1886–1971), Irish chemist and nationalist
- Thomas Dillon (judge) (c. 1535–1606), Irish judge and landowner
- Thomas Dillon (politician), Australian politician
- Tom Dillon (Australian footballer) (1920–2007), Australian rules footballer
- Tom Dillon (Gaelic footballer) (1926–2019), Irish Gaelic footballer
- Tom Dillon (rugby union) (born 1983), English rugby union footballer
