= Henry Dillon =

Henry Dillon may refer to:

- Henry Dillon, 8th Viscount Dillon (??–1714), Irish soldier
- Henry Dillon, 11th Viscount Dillon (1705–1787), Irish politician
- Henry Dillon, 13th Viscount Dillon (1777–1832), Irish politician
- Henry Dillon (American politician) (born 1981), member of the West Virginia House of Delegates
