= Judge Dillon =

Judge Dillon may refer to:

- Elizabeth K. Dillon (born 1960), judge of the United States District Court for the Western District of Virginia
- John Forrest Dillon (1831–1914), judge of the United States Circuit Court for the Eighth Circuit

== See also ==
- Samuel Hugh Dillin (1914–2006), judge of the United States District Court for the Southern District of Indiana
- Justice Dillon (disambiguation)
