= Julia Dillon =

Julia Dillon may refer to:

- Julia Lester Dillon (1871–1959), American teacher
- Julia McEntee Dillon (1834–1918), American painter

== See also ==
- Julie Dillon (born 1982), American illustrator
