= Artie Dillon =

Australian rules footballer

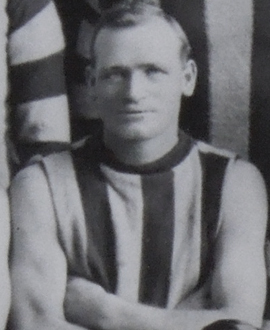
- Dillon in 1920

Personal information
- Full name: Arthur Ernest Dillon
- Born: 14 August 1894; Hindmarsh, South Australia
- Died: 10 January 1948 (aged 53); Adelaide, South Australia
- Original team: West Torrens
- Height: 170 cm (5 ft 7 in)
- Weight: 76 kg (168 lb)

Playing career^{1}
Years	Club	Games (Goals)
1920	Collingwood	2 (0)
- ^{1} Playing statistics correct to the end of 1920.

Arthur Ernest Dillon (14 August 1894 – 10 January 1948) was an Australian rules footballer who played for the Collingwood Football Club in the Victorian Football League (VFL).
