= Jane Dillon =

British designer

Jane Dillon FRSA
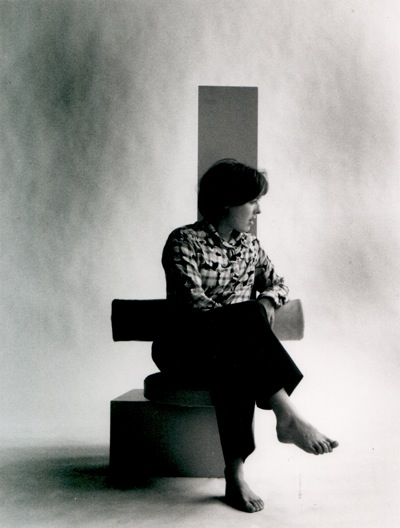
- Dillon in 1968
- Born: 1943 (age 82–83); Manchester
- Education: Royal College of Art
- Occupations: Furniture designer, interior designer, university teacher
- Employers: Olivetti (1968–1971); Royal College of Art
- Spouse: Charles Dillon

Jane Dillon, née Mary Jane Young (born 1943, Manchester, UK), is a British designer, educator and artist. She made significant contributions to furniture and Architectural lighting design across America and Europe. One of the few female international designers of her generation, Dillon's work encompassed contract and domestic furniture, lighting, textiles and glassware.

== Biography ==
Dillon was a pupil at Adcote School in Shropshire. She studied interior design at Manchester College of Art between 1961 and 1965, and subsequently in 1968, completed a Master's degree in furniture design at the Royal College of Art (RCA) in London. At the RCA, she studied under David Pye, and was a contemporary of George Hardie, Richard Wentworth, Roger Dean, and James Dyson.

Between 1968 and 1971, Dillon worked at Olivetti in Milan under Ettore Sottsass. She later founded her own studio, Charles and Jane Dillon Associates, in London. She collaborated with companies such as Habitat, Herman Miller, and Cassina.

For over 30 years, Dillon taught design at the RCA and was made an Honorary Fellow in 2007. Her complete studio archives are held at the Victoria and Albert Museum.

Dillon observed in a discussion with Design Week magazine in 2000, "Thirty years ago if someone had said 'what do you do' and I said 'I'm a designer', nine times out of ten they wouldn’t know what I meant. Now we're at the opposite end of the extreme, with design being so bastardised as to ruin our profession."
