= Dennis Anthony Dillon =

American minister, journalist, publisher and community activist

Dennis Anthony Dillon (born June 20, 1959) is an American minister, journalist, publisher, and community activist. He is the founder and president of The New York Christian Times and lead pastor at Brooklyn's Rise Church New York. He is the co-convener for The DOOR of Our Return. Dillon is known to be one of the founders of Churches United to Save and Heal (CUSH) and the convener of The Black Church Means Business Conference.

== Biography and career ==
Dillon was born in Kingston, Jamaica. As a high school student in 1976 he was a founding member gospel group, The Melodious Brother Quartet, with Joseph Redley, Roy Turner, and Collin Harris, whom he met during his first year of high school. After Leroy Gibbon joined the group as a singer, they renamed it as The Gospel Proclaimers. Dillon was one of the collaborators and mentors of his childhood friend Fitzroy Gordon, who in 2011 established the first Black-owned radio station in Canada, G98.7 CKFG. After the death of Nelson Mandela in December 2013, Dillon co-hosted an all-day tribute to Mandela with Gordon in Canada. After completing his studies, Dillon pursued his career in journalism and news reporting at news outlets including The Torch Bearer and The Bergen Sun. Later he co-founded Gospel Today magazine and Prayer Global magazine.

Dillon competed in the Brooklyn Borough President election as an independent candidate in 1997 and secured about 12,000 votes.

He is also known for hosting The Dennis Dillon Show, which featured interviews of several celebrities and noted personalities. He was also known to be closely associated with the Y.E.S. (Youth Empowered to Succeed) initiative. In 1990 Dillon founded news tabloid New York Christian Times with Karen Grainger. In 1994, Dillon founded The Black Church Means Business Conference, an annual conference supported by a coalition of churches, community leaders, businesses and corporations. Dennis is also known for his social activism related to the economic empowerment of the Black community and has been regarded as 'economic empowerment activist'. His advocacy and negotiation with financial institutions like Citibank, HSBC etc. was instrumental in granting acceptable loans to the Black community of New York City.

During 1997, the regional manager at the fashion brand Polo Ralph Lauren removed two Black and Hispanic workers from their sales duties, igniting controversy. This incident highlighted the racial tension at the workplace of Ralph Lauren and some of those allegedly mistreated employees asked Dillon for help in 1998. Consequently, Dillon successfully mediated between the employer and workers.

In 2013, Dillon received HCCI's Distinguished Service Award. In 2015, he was honored for his contribution in journalism at McDonald's Media Legends and Trailblazers Ceremony.

In 2020, a coalition of organizations, including HARLEM WEEK, NAACP, National Action Network, NY Urban League, and One Hundred Black Men NY, named Dillon, along with Andrew Cuomo and Al Sharpton, among '10 Outstanding New Yorkers' for rendering historic leadership during the crises of the COVID-19 pandemic, demonstrations against systematic racism, challenges to the important 2020 Census, and divisiveness triggered by the November national elections.

== Notable publications ==
- Bitter Truth is Better Than Sweet Falsehood, Brooklyn Lantern Corporation, 1998 ISBN 9780966873009
- Affirm Your Purpose, 2006, ISBN 9780966873061
- Kingdom Affirmations: Positive Power Prayers to Help Transform Your Life, 2008
- Economic State of Black New York 2017, 2017, ISBN 9780966873054

== Additional sources ==
- Wake Up and Smell the Dollars! Whose Inner-city is this Anyway by Dorothy Pitman Hughes, ISBN 9780965506472
