= Bill Dillon =

Bill Dillon may refer to:

- Bill Dillon (footballer) (1905–1979), Gaelic football player
- Bill Dillon (politician) (1933–1994), New Zealand politician

== See also ==
- William Dillon (disambiguation)
