= Daniel Starr =

American college athletics administrator (1934–2024)

Biographical details
- Born: September 9, 1934
- Died: September 11, 2024 (aged 90)
- Education: Canisius College, Rutgers University

Administrative career (AD unless noted)
- 1974–2000: Canisius

Accomplishments and honors

Awards
- Canisius College Sports Hall of Fame inductee (2000); Greater Buffalo Sports Hall of Fame inductee (2010)

Daniel P. Starr (September 9, 1934 – September 11, 2024) was an American college athletics administrator. Starr served as director of athletics at Canisius College from 1974 to 2000. Starr also served as a history professor at Canisius. During his 26-year career as athletic director at Canisius, Starr oversaw the creation of the Golden Griffins' women's athletic teams, as well as the building of the Demske Sports Complex on campus in 1989. In 1992, Starr hired John Beilein from NCAA Division II Le Moyne College to coach the Canisius Golden Griffins men's basketball team. Beilein led the Golden Griffins to a Metro Atlantic Athletic Conference championship in 1996, and an appearance in the 1996 NCAA Division I men's basketball tournament, the first NCAA basketball tournament appearance for Canisius since 1957. Starr was elected to the Canisius College Sports Hall of Fame in 2000 and the Greater Buffalo Sports Hall of Fame in 2010. Starr died on September 11, 2024, at the age of 90.
