= Sean Dillon =

Sean Dillon may refer to:

- Seán Dillon (born 1983), Irish footballer
- Sean Dillon (Jack Higgins character), fictional character in stories by Jack Higgins
- Sean Dillon, fictional character in British TV series Ballykissangel
- Sean Dillon (politician), Queensland politician

== See also ==
- Shaun Dillon, Scottish footballer
