= Mary Dillon =

Mary Dillon may refer to:

- Mary Dillon (businesswoman) (born 1961/62), American businesswoman
- Mary Dillon (singer) (born 1965), Northern Irish singer
- Mary E. Dillon (1886–1983), American businesswoman
