= Martin Dillon (disambiguation) =

Martin Dillon (born 1949) is a Northern Irish author.

Martin Dillon may also refer to:

- Martin Dillon (musician) (1957–2005), American musician
- Martin Andrew Dillon (1826–1913), Irish soldier
