= Daniel Dillon (footballer) =

English footballer

Personal information
- Full name: Daniel Dillon
- Date of birth: 6 September 1986 (age 40)
- Place of birth: Hillingdon, England
- Height: 5 ft 9 in (1.75 m)
- Position: Midfielder

Youth career
- ?–2003: Carlisle United

Senior career*
Years	Team	Apps	(Gls)
2003–2006	Carlisle United	15	(0)
2006–2009	Team Bath	68	(7)
2009–	Hinckley United	37	(4)
- * Club domestic league appearances and goals as of 26 July 2009

Daniel Dillon (born 6 September 1986 in London, England) is an English association football player with Alfreton Town playing in the Conference North.

After spending time at the Blackburn Rovers centre of excellence, London born youngster Dillon joined the Carlisle United academy progressing through to the reserves and broke into the first team for his debut whilst still a teenager, making him the youngest debutant in the club's history. He received interest from several Premier League clubs, including Manchester City and Sunderland FC. He was part of the squad that was relegated, and then won promotion back to The Football League at the first attempt in 2005. Dillon eventually made 15 first team appearances for Carlisle, including League Two matches, and captaining the reserves, before being released.

Whilst at Carlise he was part of the League Football Education program and, upon his release from the club, their scholarship enabled Dillon to study at the University of Bath.

Having started studying sports performance at Bath University Dillon joined Team Bath, an independent football club within the environment of the university, where he made 68 appearances and also won promotion with the club from the Southern League Premier Division to the Conference South in May 2008.

Team Bath folded for off field reasons at the end of the 2008–09 season, and Dillon was signed by Hinckley United in July 2009.

In May 2010 Dillon represented and captained the England University side which went on to win the BUCS home nations tournament, beating Scotland 1–0 in the final.

In a commemorative fixture celebrating the 15th club anniversary of Sheffield FC, Dillon was selected by Paul Fairclough to represent the England C side who provided the opposition in that game. Following that game, Dillon then penned a deal with Conference North side Alfreton Town which sees him at the Impact Arena until 2012.
