= Michael James Robert Dillon, 12th Earl of Roscommon =

Irish Earl (1798–1850)

Michael James Robert Dillon (2 October 1798 – 15 May 1850) was the 12th and last Earl of Roscommon.

Michael James Robert Dillon was born on 2 October 1798, nearly four months after his father, also called Michael Dillon, had died. Michael Dillon senior had been a captain in the Dublin Militia and he was killed at the Battle of New Ross, opposing the Irish Rebellion against British rule. The young Michael Dillon's mother was Mary Dillon, née Griffith.

The eleventh Earl of Roscommon, Patrick Dillon, had been the subject of two prolonged investigations by the Irish House of Lords during the 1790s to ascertain his legitimacy as the son of the tenth Earl, against the rival claim by Robert Dillon, a descendant of the seventh son of the first Earl and the next male heir in line. The Earldom of Roscommon became dormant on the death of Patrick Dillon in 1816. Robert Dillon having since died, his claim passed to Michael Dillon, whose grandfather James 'Surgeon' Dillon had been Robert's first cousin. Michael spent 10 years working to prove his claim to the title until 1828 when the United Kingdom House of Lords decided that he was the rightful heir to the Earldom and he became the twelfth Earl. As part of its deliberations the Lords decided against Francis Stephen Dillon, an inmate of a debtors' prison who dubiously claimed descent from the third son of the first Earl.

Michael Dillon married Charlotte Talbot on 19 August 1830. They had a single child, a son named James who was born in 1831 but died the same year. Charlotte died on 21 November 1843 and Dillon himself died on 15 May 1850 at age 51, resulting in the Earldom of Roscommon falling dormant.

Peerage of Ireland
Vacant Title last held by Patrick Dillon	Earl of Roscommon; 1828–1850	Earldom dormant
