= The Nenagh Guardian =

- Type: Weekly newspaper
- Format: Broadsheet until 2013 now Tabloid
- Owner: Nenagh Guardian Ltd
- Editor: Garry Cotter
- Founded: 1838
- Language: English
- Headquarters: 13 Summerhill, Nenagh
- City: Nenagh
- Country: Ireland
- Circulation: 6,502 (as of 2012)
- Website: nenaghguardian.ie

Old masthead

The Nenagh Guardian is a weekly local newspaper that circulates in County Tipperary, Ireland. The newspaper is based in Nenagh, County Tipperary, but is printed by the Limerick Leader in Limerick. The title incorporates two previous local papers, the Tipperary Vindicator and the Nenagh News.

The current editor is Garry Cotter.

The newspaper is printed (but not owned) by Celtic Media Group.
