= Gary P. Dillon =

American politician

Gary (Doc) Dillon

Member of the Indiana Senate from the 17th district
- In office November 6, 2002 – November 3, 2010
- Preceded by: Harold H. "Potch" Wheeler
- Succeeded by: Jim Banks

Member of the Indiana House of Representatives from the 50th district
- In office November 4, 1998 – November 6, 2002
- Preceded by: Daniel Leroy Stephen
- Succeeded by: Dan Leonard

Personal details
- Born: May 16, 1943 (age 83) South Bend, Indiana, U.S.
- Party: Republican
- Spouse: Ann
- Children: 4
- Education: Wabash College; Indiana University School of Medicine
- Occupation: Dermatologist, professor

Gary Paul "Doc" Dillon (born May 16, 1943) is an American politician in the state of Indiana.

Dillon was born in South Bend, Indiana. He attended Wabash College and the Indiana University School of Medicine and is a dermatologist. He served in the Indiana House of Representatives from 1998 to 2002 and in the Indiana State Senate from 2002 to 2010. He resides in Columbia City, Indiana.
