= James Dillon, 1st Earl of Roscommon =

Irish earl (died 1641)

James Dillon
- Earl of Roscommon
- Tenure: 1622–1641
- Successor: Robert, 2nd Earl of Roscommon
- Died: March 1641
- Spouse: Eleanor Barnewall
- Issue Detail: Robert & others
- Father: Lucas Dillon
- Mother: Jane Bathe

James Dillon, 1st Earl of Roscommon (died March 1641) fought for the crown in the Nine Years' War. He was ennobled despite being a Catholic after his son Robert turned Protestant.

== Birth and origins ==
Family tree

James Dillon with wife, parents, and other selected relatives. (Note: This family tree is partly derived from the Roscommon pedigree in Cokayne. Also see the lists of children in the text.)

James; Bathe c. 1500 – 1570; Chief Baron	Robert; Dillon of Newtown d. 1579; Chief Justice	Elizabeth; Barnewall
Jane; Bathe	Lucas; Dillon c. 1530 – 1593; Chief Baron	Marion; Sharl d. 1607	Christopher; Barnewall; 1522–1575
James; 1st Earl d. 1641	Eleanor; Barnewall d. 1628	Theobald; 1st Viscount d. 1624
Robert; 2nd Earl d. 1642	Margaret; Barry	Jane; Dillon m. 1604	Christopher; Dillon of Ballylaghan d. 1624
James; 3rd Earl c. 1605 – 1649	Elizabeth; Wentworth	Lucas; 2nd Viscount; 1610–1629

Legend

XXX	Subject of the article	XXX	Earls of Roscommon	XXX	Viscounts; Dillon

James was born in Ireland, the eldest son of Lucas Dillon (c. 1530 – 1593) and his first wife Jane Bathe. At the time of his birth, his father was a lawyer but would later become a judge and finish his career as Chief Baron of the Irish Exchequer. His father's family was Old English and descended from Sir Henry Dillon who came to Ireland with Prince John in 1185 during the Anglo-Norman invasion of Ireland. His family held substantial lands in Meath, Westmeath, Longford, and Roscommon.

James's mother was a daughter of James Bathe (c. 1500 – 1570), who preceded James's father as chief baron of the Irish Exchequer. She was James's father's first wife. His father's second marriage was childless. James was one of 12 siblings, who are listed in his father's article.

== Stepmother ==
Dillon's father remarried in 1575 to Marion Barnewall, née Sharl (or Sherle), the widow of Sir Christopher Barnewall (1522–1575) of Turvey House, Dublin. Marion, his stepmother, had 15 children from her first marriage, among them Eleanor with whom James fell in love.

== Marriage and children ==
Dillon married Eleanor Barnewall, also called Helen, his step-sister through his father's second marriage. She was a daughter of Sir Christopher Barnewall of Turvey.

James and Eleanor had 13 children, seven sons:

1. Robert (died 1642) became the 2nd Earl
2. Lucas of Twomere, or of Trinity Island, County Cavan, from whom the 9th, 10th and 11th earls descended, married Mary, daughter of Sir John Thorpe
3. Thomas, died childless
4. Christopher, died childless
5. George, died childless
6. John, died childless
7. Patrick, from whom the 12th and last Earl descended, married Jane Malone, daughter of Edmund Malone

—and six daughters:

1. Jane, married in 1604 her distant cousin Sir Christopher Dillon, son of Theobald Dillon, 1st Viscount Dillon
2. Elizabeth, married Hussey, Baron Galtrim
3. Frances, married the playwright and politician Henry Burnell and had many children, including the poet Eleanor Burnell
4. Margaret, married a Nugent of Drumcree
5. Mary, married sir John Bellew
6. Alison, married Roger O'Farrell of Morrin, chief of his name

== Later life, death, and timeline ==
Dillon's father died in February 1593 in Dublin. There must have been some complications with the inheritance as Dillon obtained special livery of his inheritance in 1595 when he was about 30.

In 1599, during the Nine Years' War (1593–1603), Dillon raised a troop of 25 horse loyal to Elizabeth I at his own expense, to help keep order in County Roscommon. Dillon was knighted, probably by the new Lord Deputy Mountjoy in November 1600.

His eldest son, Robert, the future 2nd earl, and his grandson James, the future 3rd earl, were both raised as Catholics but conformed to the established religion, while Dillon himself stayed Catholic. Robert converted before 1619. James, born in 1605, was at a young age converted by James Ussher, Archbishop of Armagh.

On 24 January 1620 Dillon was raised to the peerage with the title of Baron Dillon of Kilkenny-West, in the Peerage of Ireland. This elevation was announced in a ceremony performed by the chief governor of Ireland, Lord Deputy Oliver St. John, in the Presence Chamber of Dublin Castle on 25 January.

On 5 August 1622 Lord Kilkenny-West was advanced to the dignity of Earl of Roscommon. His baronial dignity became a subsidiary title, which he gave as a courtesy title to his heir apparent as is the custom. His eldest son Robert, therefore, was styled Lord Kilkenny-West from 1622 on.

Lord Roscommon was a signatory of a response to Charles I from the Lords of the Pale that established a military force to protect The Crown's interests in Ireland. In 1627, he was a Commissioner for raising money for the King's Army in Meath, Westmeath and Longford.

His wife predeceased him on 11 October 1628.

On 14 July 1634, Lord Roscommon took his seat in the Irish House of Lords. This was the first Irish Parliament called by King Charles I.

He died in March 1641 and was succeeded in his titles by his eldest son, Robert as the 2nd Earl of Roscommon.

Timeline
Age	Date	Event
0	1565, estimate	Born (Note: He must be born before 1575 when his father married his 2nd wife. As he was the eldest of 7 brothers and he had sisters as well, ample time must be given for all these children to be born.)
4–5	1570	Father appointed Chief Baron of the Irish Exchequer
9–10	1575	Father married 2ndly Marion Barnewall, née Sharl, after James's mother's death
21–22	1587, about	Married Eleanor (or Helen), 2nd Daughter of Sir Christopher Barnewall by Marion Sharl, his stepmother
27–28	1593, Feb	Father died in Dublin
29–30	1595, 8 Apr	Had special livery of his inheritance.
33–34	1599	Raised a troop of 25 horse loyal to Elizabeth I at his own expense
34–35	1600, 21 Jan	Mountjoy, appointed Lord Deputy of Ireland
37–38	1603, 24 Mar	Accession of King James I, succeeding Queen Elizabeth I
37–38	1603, 30 Mar	The Treaty of Mellifont ended Tyrone's Rebellion.
38–39	1604, Nov	Daughter Jane married Christopher Dillon of Ballylaghan, the heir apparent of Theobald Dillon, 1st Viscount Dillon
39–40	1605, about	Birth of grandson James, the future 3rd Earl
49–50	1615, 2 Jul	Oliver St John, appointed Lord Deputy of Ireland
54–55	1620, 24 Jan	Created Baron Dillon of Kilkenny-West
56–57	1622, 5 Aug	Elevated to Earl of Roscommon
59–60	1625, 27 Mar	Accession of King Charles I, succeeding King James I
62–63	1628, 11 Oct	Wife died
62–63	1634, 14 Jul	Took his seat in the Irish House of Lords
75–76	1641, Mar	Died

== Notes and references ==
=== Sources ===
- Augusteijn, Joost (2004). "Mellifont, treaty of". In Connolly, Sean Joseph (ed.). The Oxford Companion to Irish History (2nd ed.). Oxford: Oxford University Press. pp. 373–374. ISBN 0-19-280501-0.
- Ball, Francis Elrington (1926). The Judges in Ireland 1221–1921. Vol. I (1st ed.). London: John Murray. OCLC 832154869. – 1221 to 1690
- Burke, Bernard (1883). A Genealogical History of the Dormant, Abeyant, Forfeited and Extinct Peerages of the British Empire (New ed.). London: Harrison. OCLC 499232768.
- Burke, Bernard; Burke, Ashworth Peter (1915). A Genealogical and Heraldic History of the Peerage and Baronetage, the Privy Council, Knightage and Companionage (77th ed.). London: Harrison. OCLC 1155471554.
- Clarke, Aidan (1964). "The Army and Politics in Ireland 1625–30". Studia Hibernica (4): 28–53. doi:10.3828/sh.1964.4.2. JSTOR 20495781. S2CID 240837304.
- Clavin, Terry (October 2009). McGuire, James; Quinn, James (eds.). "Dillon, Lucas (Luke)". Dictionary of Irish Biography.
- Cokayne, George Edward (1895). Complete Peerage of England, Scotland, Ireland, Great Britain and the United Kingdom, Extant, Extinct, or Dormant. Vol. VI (1st ed.). London: George Bell and Sons. OCLC 1180818801. – N to R (for Roscommon)
- Crawford, Jon G. (2004). "Dillon, Sir Lucas (d. 1592)". In Matthew, Colin; Harrison, Brian (eds.). Oxford Dictionary of National Biography. Vol. 16. New York: Oxford University Press. pp. 219–220. ISBN 0-19-861366-0. (for his father)
- Debrett, John (1828). Peerage of the United Kingdom of Great Britain and Ireland. Vol. II (17th ed.). London: F. C. and J. Rivington. OCLC 54499602. – Scotland and Ireland
- Fryde, Edmund Boleslaw; Greenway, D. E.; Porter, S.; Roy, I., eds. (1986). Handbook of British Chronology. Royal Historical Society Guides and Handbooks, No. 2 (3rd ed.). London: Offices of the Royal Historical Society. ISBN 0-86193-106-8. – (for timeline)
- Lodge, John (1789). Archdall, Mervyn (ed.). The Peerage of Ireland or, A Genealogical History of the Present Nobility of that Kingdom. Vol. IV. Dublin: James Moore. OCLC 264906028. – Viscounts (for Dillon)
- Shaw, William A. (1906). The Knights of England. Vol. II. London: Sherratt & Hughes. – Knights bachelors & Index
- Smyth, Constantine (1839). Chronicle of the Law Officers of Ireland. London: Henry Butterworth. OCLC 1018312937.
- Webb, Alfred (1878). "Dillon, Theobald, Viscount". Compendium of Irish Biography. Dublin: M. H. Gill & Son. p. 149. OCLC 122693688.

Peerage of Ireland
New creation	Earl of Roscommon; 1622–1641	Succeeded by Robert Dillon
New creation	Baron Dillon of Kilkenny West; 1620–1641	Succeeded by Robert Dillon
