= List of peers 1640–1649 =

This page lists all peers who held extant titles between 1640 and 1649.

== Peerage of England ==
Title	Holder	Date gained	Date lost	Notes
Duke of Cornwall (1337)	Prince Charles	1630	1649	Ascended the Throne, and all his honours merged in the Crown
Duke of Buckingham (1623)	George Villiers, 2nd Duke of Buckingham	1628	1687	
Duke of Richmond (1641)	James Stewart, 1st Duke of Richmond	1641	1655	New creation
Duke of Cumberland (1644)	Prince Rupert of the Rhine	1644	1682	New creation
Duke of York (1644)	James Stuart	1644	1685	New creation
Marquess of Winchester (1551)	John Paulet, 5th Marquess of Winchester	1628	1675	
Marquess of Hertford (1641)	William Seymour, 1st Marquess of Hertford	1641	1660	New creation
Marquess of Worcester (1642)	Henry Somerset, 1st Marquess of Worcester	1642	1646	New creation; died
Marquess of Worcester (1642)	Edward Somerset, 2nd Marquess of Worcester	1646	1667	
Marquess of Newcastle-upon-Tyne (1643)	William Cavendish, 1st Marquess of Newcastle-upon-Tyne	1643	1676	New creation
Marquess of Dorchester (1645)	Henry Pierrepont, 1st Marquess of Dorchester	1645	1680	New creation
Earl of Arundel (1138)	Thomas Howard, 21st Earl of Arundel	1604	1646	Died
Earl of Arundel (1138)	Henry Howard, 22nd Earl of Arundel	1646	1652	
Earl of Oxford (1142)	Aubrey de Vere, 20th Earl of Oxford	1632	1703	
Earl of Shrewsbury (1442)	John Talbot, 10th Earl of Shrewsbury	1630	1654	
Earl of Kent (1465)	Anthony Grey, 9th Earl of Kent	1639	1643	Died
Earl of Kent (1465)	Henry Grey, 10th Earl of Kent	1643	1651	
Earl of Derby (1485)	William Stanley, 6th Earl of Derby	1594	1642	Died
Earl of Derby (1485)	James Stanley, 7th Earl of Derby	1642	1651	
Earl of Worcester (1514)	Henry Somerset, 5th Earl of Worcester	1628	1646	Created Marquess of Worcester, see above
Earl of Cumberland (1525)	Francis Clifford, 4th Earl of Cumberland	1605	1641	Died
Earl of Cumberland (1525)	Henry Clifford, 5th Earl of Cumberland	1641	1643	Died, title extinct
Earl of Rutland (1525)	George Manners, 7th Earl of Rutland	1632	1641	Died
Earl of Rutland (1525)	John Manners, 8th Earl of Rutland	1641	1679	
Earl of Huntingdon (1529)	Henry Hastings, 5th Earl of Huntingdon	1604	1643	Died
Earl of Huntingdon (1529)	Ferdinando Hastings, 6th Earl of Huntingdon	1643	1656	
Earl of Sussex (1529)	Edward Radclyffe, 6th Earl of Sussex	1629	1643	Died, title extinct
Earl of Bath (1536)	Henry Bourchier, 5th Earl of Bath	1636	1654	
Earl of Southampton (1547)	Thomas Wriothesley, 4th Earl of Southampton	1624	1667	
Earl of Bedford (1550)	Francis Russell, 4th Earl of Bedford	1627	1641	Died
Earl of Bedford (1550)	William Russell, 5th Earl of Bedford	1641	1700	
Earl of Pembroke (1551)	Philip Herbert, 4th Earl of Pembroke	1630	1649	Died
Earl of Pembroke (1551)	Philip Herbert, 5th Earl of Pembroke	1649	1669	
Earl of Devon (1553)	William Courtenay, de jure 5th Earl of Devon	1638	1702	
Earl of Northumberland (1557)	Algernon Percy, 10th Earl of Northumberland	1632	1668	
Earl of Hertford (1559)	William Seymour, 2nd Earl of Herford	1621	1660	Created Marquess of Hertford, see above
Earl of Essex (1572)	Robert Devereux, 3rd Earl of Essex	1604	1646	Died, title extinct; Viscountcy of Hereford succeeded by a cousin, see below
Earl of Lincoln (1572)	Theophilus Clinton, 4th Earl of Lincoln	1619	1667	
Earl of Nottingham (1596)	Charles Howard, 2nd Earl of Nottingham	1624	1642	Died
Earl of Nottingham (1596)	Charles Howard, 3rd Earl of Nottingham	1642	1681	
Earl of Suffolk (1603)	Theophilus Howard, 2nd Earl of Suffolk	1626	1640	Died
Earl of Suffolk (1603)	James Howard, 3rd Earl of Suffolk	1640	1689	
Earl of Dorset (1604)	Edward Sackville, 4th Earl of Dorset	1624	1652	
Earl of Exeter (1605)	William Cecil, 2nd Earl of Exeter	1623	1640	Died
Earl of Exeter (1605)	David Cecil, 3rd Earl of Exeter	1640	1643	
Earl of Exeter (1605)	David Cecil, 3rd Earl of Exeter	1643	1678	
Earl of Salisbury (1605)	William Cecil, 2nd Earl of Salisbury	1612	1668	
Earl of Somerset (1613)	Robert Carr, 1st Earl of Somerset	1613	1645	Died, title extinct
Earl of Bridgewater (1617)	John Egerton, 1st Earl of Bridgewater	1617	1649	Died
Earl of Bridgewater (1617)	John Egerton, 2nd Earl of Bridgewater	1649	1686	
Earl of Northampton (1618)	Spencer Compton, 2nd Earl of Northampton	1630	1643	Died
Earl of Northampton (1618)	James Compton, 3rd Earl of Northampton	1643	1681	
Earl of Leicester (1618)	Robert Sidney, 2nd Earl of Leicester	1626	1677	
Earl of Warwick (1618)	Robert Rich, 2nd Earl of Warwick	1618	1658	
Earl of Devonshire (1618)	William Cavendish, 3rd Earl of Devonshire	1628	1684	
Earl of March (1619)	James Stewart, 2nd Earl of March	1624	1655	Duke of Lennox in the Peerage of Scotland; created Duke of Richmond in 1641, see above
Earl of Cambridge (1619)	James Hamilton, 2nd Earl of Cambridge	1625	1649	Marquess, and after 1643 Duke of Hamilton in the Peerage of Scotland; died
Earl of Cambridge (1619)	William Hamilton, 3rd Earl of Cambridge	1649	1651	Duke of Hamilton in the Peerage of Scotland
Earl of Carlisle (1622)	James Hay, 2nd Earl of Carlisle	1636	1660	
Earl of Denbigh (1622)	William Feilding, 1st Earl of Denbigh	1622	1643	Died
Earl of Denbigh (1622)	Basil Feilding, 2nd Earl of Denbigh	1643	1675	
Earl of Bristol (1622)	John Digby, 1st Earl of Bristol	1622	1653	
Earl of Middlesex (1622)	Lionel Cranfield, 1st Earl of Middlesex	1622	1645	Died
Earl of Middlesex (1622)	James Cranfield, 2nd Earl of Middlesex	1645	1651	
Earl of Anglesey (1623)	Charles Villiers, 2nd Earl of Anglesey	1630	1661	
Earl of Holland (1624)	Henry Rich, 1st Earl of Holland	1624	1649	Died
Earl of Holland (1624)	Robert Rich, 2nd Earl of Holland	1649	1675	
Earl of Clare (1624)	John Holles, 2nd Earl of Clare	1637	1666	
Earl of Bolingbroke (1624)	Oliver St John, 1st Earl of Bolingbroke	1624	1646	Died
Earl of Bolingbroke (1624)	Oliver St John, 2nd Earl of Bolingbroke	1646	1688	
Earl of Westmorland (1624)	Mildmay Fane, 2nd Earl of Westmorland	1629	1666	
Earl of Cleveland (1626)	Thomas Wentworth, 1st Earl of Cleveland	1626	1667	
Earl of Danby (1626)	Henry Danvers, 1st Earl of Danby	1626	1644	Died, title extinct
Earl of Manchester (1626)	Henry Montagu, 1st Earl of Manchester	1626	1642	Died
Earl of Manchester (1626)	Edward Montagu, 2nd Earl of Manchester	1642	1671	
Earl of Marlborough (1626)	James Ley, 3rd Earl of Marlborough	1638	1665	
Earl of Mulgrave (1626)	Edmund Sheffield, 1st Earl of Mulgrave	1626	1646	Died
Earl of Mulgrave (1626)	Edmund Sheffield, 2nd Earl of Mulgrave	1646	1658	
Earl of Berkshire (1626)	Thomas Howard, 1st Earl of Berkshire	1626	1669	
Earl of Monmouth (1626)	Henry Carey, 2nd Earl of Monmouth	1639	1661	
Earl Rivers (1626)	Thomas Darcy, 1st Earl Rivers	1626	1640	Died
Earl Rivers (1626)	John Savage, 2nd Earl Rivers	1640	1654	
Earl of Lindsey (1626)	Robert Bertie, 1st Earl of Lindsey	1626	1642	Died
Earl of Lindsey (1626)	Montagu Bertie, 2nd Earl of Lindsey	1642	1666	
Earl of Newcastle-upon-Tyne (1628)	William Cavendish, 1st Earl of Newcastle-upon-Tyne	1628	1676	Created Marquess of Newcastle-upon-Tyne, see above
Earl of Dover (1628)	Henry Carey, 1st Earl of Dover	1628	1666	
Earl of Peterborough (1628)	John Mordaunt, 1st Earl of Peterborough	1628	1643	Died
Earl of Peterborough (1628)	Henry Mordaunt, 2nd Earl of Peterborough	1643	1697	
Earl of Stamford (1628)	Henry Grey, 1st Earl of Stamford	1628	1673	
Earl of Winchilsea (1628)	Heneage Finch, 3rd Earl of Winchilsea	1639	1689	
Earl of Kingston-upon-Hull (1628)	Robert Pierrepont, 1st Earl of Kingston-upon-Hull	1628	1643	Died
Earl of Kingston-upon-Hull (1628)	Henry Pierrepont, 2nd Earl of Kingston-upon-Hull	1643	1680	Created Marquess of Dorchester, see above
Earl of Carnarvon (1628)	Robert Dormer, 1st Earl of Carnarvon	1628	1643	Died
Earl of Carnarvon (1628)	Charles Dormer, 2nd Earl of Carnarvon	1643	1709	
Earl of Newport (1628)	Mountjoy Blount, 1st Earl of Newport	1628	1666	
Earl of Chesterfield (1628)	Philip Stanhope, 1st Earl of Chesterfield	1628	1656	
Earl of Thanet (1628)	John Tufton, 2nd Earl of Thanet	1632	1664	
Earl of St Albans (1628)	Ulick Burke, 2nd Earl of St Albans	1635	1657	Earl, and then Marquess of Clanricarde in the Peerage of Ireland
Earl of Portland (1633)	Jerome Weston, 2nd Earl of Portland	1635	1663	
Earl of Strafford (1640)	Thomas Wentworth, 1st Earl of Strafford	1640	1641	New creation; attainted
Earl Rivers (1641)	Elizabeth Savage, Countess Rivers	1641	1651	New creation; peerage for life only
Earl of Strafford (1641)	William Wentworth, 1st Earl of Strafford	1641	1695	New creation
Earl of Sunderland (1643)	Henry Spencer, 1st Earl of Sunderland	1643	1643	New creation
Earl of Sunderland (1643)	Robert Spencer, 2nd Earl of Sunderland	1643	1702	
Earl of Sussex (1644)	Thomas Savile, 1st Earl of Sussex	1644	1659	New creation
Earl of Brentford (1644)	Patrick Ruthven, 1st Earl of Brentford	1644	1651	New creation
Earl of Chichester (1644)	Francis Leigh, 1st Earl of Chichester	1644	1653	New creation
Earl of Norwich (1644)	George Goring, 1st Earl of Norwich	1644	1663	New creation
Earl of Scarsdale (1645)	Francis Leke, 1st Earl of Scarsdale	1645	1655	New creation
Earl of Lichfield (1645)	Charles Stewart, 1st Earl of Lichfield	1645	1672	New creation
Viscount Hereford (1550)	Walter Devereux, 5th Viscount Hereford	1646	1658	Title previously held by Earls of Essex (extinct in 1646)
Viscount Montagu (1554)	Francis Browne, 3rd Viscount Montagu	1629	1682	
Viscount Purbeck (1618)	John Villiers, 1st Viscount Purbeck	1619	1657	
Viscount Saye and Sele (1624)	William Fiennes, 1st Viscount Saye and Sele	1624	1662	
Viscount Savage (1626)	John Savage, 2nd Earl Rivers	1635	1654	Succeeded as Earl Rivers, see above
Viscount Conway (1627)	Edward Conway, 2nd Viscount Conway	1631	1655	
Viscount Campden (1628)	Edward Noel, 2nd Viscount Campden	1629	1643	Died
Viscount Campden (1628)	Baptist Noel, 3rd Viscount Campden	1643	1682	
Viscount Wentworth (1628)	Thomas Wentworth, 1st Viscount Wentworth	1628	1641	Created Earl of Strafford, see above
Viscount Stafford (1640)	William Howard, 1st Viscount Stafford	1640	1680	New creation
Viscount Fauconberg (1643)	Thomas Belasyse, 1st Viscount Fauconberg	1643	1653	New creation
Baron de Ros (1264)	Katherine Manners, 19th Baroness de Ros	1632	1649	Died, title succeeded by the Duke of Buckingham, and on his death fell into abeyance
Baron de Clifford (1299)	Anne Clifford, 14th Baroness de Clifford	1605	1676	
Baron Morley (1299)	Henry Parker, 14th Baron Morley	1622	1655	
Baron Dacre (1321)	Francis Lennard, 14th Baron Dacre	1630	1662	
Baron Grey of Ruthyn (1325)	Charles Longueville, 12th Baron Grey de Ruthyn	1639	1643	Died
Baron Grey of Ruthyn (1325)	Susan Longueville, 13th Baroness Grey de Ruthyn	1643	1676	
Baron Darcy de Knayth (1332)	Conyers Darcy, 7th Baron Darcy de Knayth	1641	1653	Abeyance terminated
Baron Berkeley (1421)	George Berkeley, 8th Baron Berkeley	1613	1658	
Baron Dudley (1440)	Edward Sutton, 5th Baron Dudley	1586	1643	Died
Baron Dudley (1440)	Frances Ward, 6th Baroness Dudley	1643	1697	
Baron Stourton (1448)	William Stourton, 11th Baron Stourton	1633	1672	
Baron Willoughby de Broke (1491)	Greville Verney, 7th Baron Willoughby de Broke	1631	1642	Died
Baron Willoughby de Broke (1491)	Greville Verney, 8th Baron Willoughby de Broke	1642	1648	Died
Baron Willoughby de Broke (1491)	Greville Verney, 9th Baron Willoughby de Broke	1648	1668	
Baron Monteagle (1514)	Henry Parker, 5th Baron Monteagle	1622	1655	
Baron Vaux of Harrowden (1523)	Edward Vaux, 4th Baron Vaux of Harrowden	1595	1661	
Baron Sandys of the Vine (1529)	Elizabeth Sandys, 5th Baroness Sandys	1629	1645	Died
Baron Sandys of the Vine (1529)	William Sandys, 6th Baron Sandys	1645	1668	
Baron Windsor (1529)	Thomas Windsor, 6th Baron Windsor	1605	1642	Died, Barony fell into abeyance until 1660
Baron Eure (1544)	William Eure, 4th Baron Eure	1617	1646	Died
Baron Eure (1544)	William Eure, 5th Baron Eure	1646	1652	
Baron Wharton (1545)	Philip Wharton, 4th Baron Wharton	1625	1695	
Baron Willoughby of Parham (1547)	Francis Willoughby, 5th Baron Willoughby of Parham	1618	1666	
Baron Paget (1552)	William Paget, 5th Baron Paget	1629	1678	
Baron North (1554)	Dudley North, 3rd Baron North	1600	1666	
Baron Chandos (1554)	George Brydges, 6th Baron Chandos	1621	1655	
Baron De La Warr (1570)	Charles West, 5th Baron De La Warr	1628	1687	
Baron Norreys (1572)	Elizabeth Wray, 3rd Baroness Norreys	1622	1645	Died
Baron Norreys (1572)	Bridget Bertie, 4th Baroness Norreys	1645	1657	
Baron (A)bergavenny (1604)	Henry Nevill, 2nd Baron Bergavenny	1622	1641	Died, Barony dormant
Baron Gerard (1603)	Dutton Gerard, 3rd Baron Gerard	1622	1640	Died
Baron Gerard (1603)	Charles Gerard, 4th Baron Gerard	1640	1667	
Baron Petre (1603)	William Petre, 4th Baron Petre	1638	1684	
Baron Spencer (1603)	Henry Spencer, 3rd Baron Spencer of Wormleighton	1636	1643	Created Earl of Sunderland, see above
Baron Arundell of Wardour (1605)	Thomas Arundell, 2nd Baron Arundell of Wardour	1639	1643	Died
Baron Arundell of Wardour (1605)	Henry Arundell, 3rd Baron Arundell of Wardour	1643	1694	
Baron Stanhope of Harrington (1605)	Charles Stanhope, 2nd Baron Stanhope	1621	1675	
Baron Teynham (1616)	John Roper, 3rd Baron Teynham	1628	1673	
Baron Brooke (1621)	Robert Greville, 2nd Baron Brooke	1628	1643	Died
Baron Brooke (1621)	Francis Greville, 3rd Baron Brooke	1643	1658	
Baron Montagu of Boughton (1621)	Edward Montagu, 1st Baron Montagu of Boughton	1621	1644	Died
Baron Montagu of Boughton (1621)	Edward Montagu, 2nd Baron Montagu of Boughton	1644	1684	
Baron Grey of Warke (1624)	William Grey, 1st Baron Grey of Werke	1624	1674	
Baron Deincourt (1624)	Francis Leke, 1st Baron Deincourt	1624	1655	Created Earl of Scarsdale, see above
Baron Robartes (1625)	John Robartes, 2nd Baron Robartes	1625	1685	
Baron Craven (1627)	Willian Craven, 1st Baron Craven	1627	1697	
Baron Fauconberg (1627)	Thomas Belasyse, 1st Baron Fauconberg	1627	1653	Created Viscount Fauconberg, see above
Baron Lovelace (1627)	John Lovelace, 2nd Baron Lovelace	1634	1670	
Baron Poulett (1627)	John Poulett, 1st Baron Poulett	1627	1649	Died
Baron Poulett (1627)	John Poulett, 2nd Baron Poulett	1649	1665	
Baron Clifford (1628)	Henry Clifford, 1st Baron Clifford	1628	1643	Succeeded as Earl of Cumberland, see above
Baron Clifford (1628)	Elizabeth Boyle, Baroness Clifford	1643	1691	
Baron Brudenell (1628)	Thomas Brudenell, 1st Baron Brudenell	1628	1663	
Baron Hervey (1628)	William Hervey, 1st Baron Hervey	1628	1642	Died, title extinct
Baron Strange (1628)	James Stanley, 1st Baron Strange	1628	1651	Succeeded as Earl of Derby, see above
Baron Maynard (1628)	William Maynard, 1st Baron Maynard	1628	1640	Died
Baron Maynard (1628)	William Maynard, 2nd Baron Maynard	1640	1699	
Baron Coventry (1628)	Thomas Coventry, 1st Baron Coventry	1628	1640	Died
Baron Coventry (1628)	Thomas Coventry, 2nd Baron Coventry	1640	1661	
Baron Goring (1628)	George Goring, 1st Baron Goring	1628	1644	Created Earl of Norwich, see above
Baron Mohun of Okehampton (1628)	John Mohun, 1st Baron Mohun of Okehampton	1628	1640	Died
Baron Mohun of Okehampton (1628)	Warwick Mohun, 2nd Baron Mohun of Okehampton	1640	1665	
Baron Boteler of Brantfield (1628)	William Boteler, 2nd Baron Boteler of Brantfield	1637	1657	
Baron Dunsmore (1628)	Francis Leigh, 1st Baron Dunsmore	1628	1653	Created Earl of Chichester, see above
Baron Powis (1629)	William Herbert, 1st Baron Powis	1629	1655	
Baron Herbert of Chirbury (1629)	Edward Herbert, 1st Baron Herbert of Cherbury	1629	1648	Died
Baron Herbert of Chirbury (1629)	Richard Herbert, 2nd Baron Herbert of Chirbury	1648	1655	
Baron Cottington (1631)	Francis Cottington, 1st Baron Cottington	1631	1652	
Baron Finch (1640)	John Finch, 1st Baron Finch	1640	1660	New creation
Baron (A)bergavenny (1641)	John Nevill, 1st Baron Bergavenny	1641	1662	New creation
Baron Lyttelton (1641)	Edward Littleton, 1st Baron Lyttelton	1641	1645	New creation; died, title extinct
Baron Seymour of Trowbridge (1641)	Francis Seymour, 1st Baron Seymour of Trowbridge	1641	1664	New creation
Baron Capell of Hadham (1641)	Arthur Capell, 1st Baron Capell of Hadham	1641	1649	New creation; died
Baron Capell of Hadham (1641)	Arthur Capell, 2nd Baron Capell of Hadham	1649	1683	
Baron Hatton (1642)	Christopher Hatton, 1st Baron Hatton	1642	1670	New creation
Baron Newport (1642)	Richard Newport, 1st Baron Newport	1642	1651	New creation
Baron Craven of Ryton (1643)	John Craven, 1st Baron Craven of Ryton	1643	1648	New creation; died, title extinct
Baron Percy of Alnwick (1643)	Henry Percy, Baron Percy of Alnwick	1643	1659	New creation
Baron Leigh (1643)	Thomas Leigh, 1st Baron Leigh	1643	1672	New creation
Baron Hopton (1643)	Ralph Hopton, 1st Baron Hopton	1643	1652	New creation
Baron Jermyn (1643)	Henry Jermyn, 1st Baron Jermyn	1643	1684	New creation
Baron Byron (1643)	John Byron, 1st Baron Byron	1643	1652	New creation
Baron Loughborough (1643)	Henry Hastings, 1st Baron Loughborough	1643	1667	New creation
Baron Widdrington (1643)	William Widdrington, 1st Baron Widdrington	1643	1651	New creation
Baron Ward (1644)	Humble Ward, 1st Baron Ward	1644	1670	New creation
Baron Colepeper (1644)	John Colepeper, 1st Baron Colepeper	1644	1660	New creation
Baron Astley of Reading (1644)	Jacob Astley, 1st Baron Astley of Reading	1644	1652	New creation
Baron Cobham (1645)	John Brooke, 1st Baron Cobham	1645	1660	New creation
Baron Lucas of Shenfield (1645)	John Lucas, 1st Baron Lucas of Shenfield	1645	1671	New creation
Baron Belasyse (1645)	John Belasyse, 1st Baron Belasyse	1645	1689	New creation
Baron Rockingham (1645)	Lewis Watson, 1st Baron Rockingham	1645	1653	New creation
Baron Reede (1645)	John de Reede, 1st Baron Reede	1645	1653	New creation; Dutch diplomat
Baron Gerard of Brandon (1645)	Charles Gerard, 1st Baron Gerard of Brandon	1645	1694	New creation
Baron Lexinton (1645)	Robert Sutton, 1st Baron Lexinton	1645	1668	New creation

== Peerage of Scotland ==
Title	Holder	Date gained	Date lost	Notes
Duke of Rothesay (1398)	Charles Stuart, Duke of Rothesay	1630	1649	Acceded to the Throne of England and Scotland
Duke of Lennox (1581)	James Stewart, 4th Duke of Lennox	1624	1655	
Duke of Hamilton (1643)	James Hamilton, 1st Duke of Hamilton	1643	1649	New creation; died
Duke of Hamilton (1643)	William Hamilton, 2nd Duke of Hamilton	1649	1651	
Marquess of Huntly (1599)	George Gordon, 2nd Marquess of Huntly	1636	1649	Died
Marquess of Huntly (1599)	Lewis Gordon, 3rd Marquess of Huntly	1649	1653	
Marquess of Hamilton (1599)	James Hamilton, 3rd Marquess of Hamilton	1625	1649	Created Duke of Hamilton, see above
Marquess of Douglas (1633)	William Douglas, 1st Marquess of Douglas	1633	1660	
Marquess of Argyll (1641)	Archibald Campbell, 1st Marquess of Argyll	1641	1661	New creation
Marquess of Montrose (1644)	James Graham, 1st Marquess of Montrose	1644	1650	New creation
Earl of Argyll (1457)	Archibald Campbell, 8th Earl of Argyll	1638	1661	Created Marquess of Argyll, see above
Earl of Crawford (1398)	Ludovic Lindsay, 16th Earl of Crawford	1639	1652	
Earl of Erroll (1452)	Gilbert Hay, 11th Earl of Erroll	1636	1674	
Earl Marischal (1458)	William Keith, 7th Earl Marischal	1635	1671	
Earl of Sutherland (1235)	John Gordon, 14th Earl of Sutherland	1615	1679	
Earl of Mar (1114)	John Erskine, 19th Earl of Mar	1634	1654	
Earl of Rothes (1458)	John Leslie, 6th Earl of Rothes	1611	1641	Died
Earl of Rothes (1458)	John Leslie, 7th Earl of Rothes	1641	1681	
Earl of Morton (1458)	William Douglas, 7th Earl of Morton	1606	1648	Died
Earl of Morton (1458)	Robert Douglas, 8th Earl of Morton	1648	1649	Died
Earl of Morton (1458)	William Douglas, 9th Earl of Morton	1649	1681	
Earl of Menteith (1427)	William Graham, 7th Earl of Menteith	1598	1661	
Earl of Glencairn (1488)	William Cunningham, 9th Earl of Glencairn	1631	1664	
Earl of Eglinton (1507)	Alexander Montgomerie, 6th Earl of Eglinton	1612	1661	
Earl of Montrose (1503)	James Graham, 5th Earl of Montrose	1626	1650	Created Marquess of Montrose, see above
Earl of Cassilis (1509)	John Kennedy, 6th Earl of Cassilis	1615	1668	
Earl of Caithness (1455)	George Sinclair, 5th Earl of Caithness	1582	1643	Died
Earl of Caithness (1455)	George Sinclair, 6th Earl of Caithness	1643	1672	
Earl of Buchan (1469)	James Erskine, 7th Earl of Buchan	1628	1664	
Earl of Moray (1562)	James Stewart, 4th Earl of Moray	1638	1653	
Earl of Linlithgow (1600)	Alexander Livingston, 2nd Earl of Linlithgow	1621	1650	
Earl of Winton (1600)	George Seton, 3rd Earl of Winton	1607	1650	
Earl of Home (1605)	James Home, 3rd Earl of Home	1633	1666	
Earl of Perth (1605)	John Drummond, 2nd Earl of Perth	1611	1662	
Earl of Dunfermline (1605)	Charles Seton, 2nd Earl of Dunfermline	1622	1672	
Earl of Wigtown (1606)	John Fleming, 2nd Earl of Wigtown	1619	1650	
Earl of Abercorn (1606)	James Hamilton, 2nd Earl of Abercorn	1618	1670	
Earl of Kinghorne (1606)	John Lyon, 2nd Earl of Kinghorne	1615	1646	Died
Earl of Kinghorne (1606)	Patrick Lyon, 3rd Earl of Kinghorne	1646	1695	
Earl of Roxburghe (1616)	Robert Ker, 1st Earl of Roxburghe	1616	1650	
Earl of Kellie (1619)	Thomas Erskine, 2nd Earl of Kellie	1639	1643	Died
Earl of Kellie (1619)	Alexander Erskine, 3rd Earl of Kellie	1643	1677	
Earl of Buccleuch (1619)	Francis Scott, 2nd Earl of Buccleuch	1633	1651	
Earl of Haddington (1619)	Thomas Hamilton, 2nd Earl of Haddington	1637	1640	Died
Earl of Haddington (1619)	Thomas Hamilton, 3rd Earl of Haddington	1640	1645	Died
Earl of Haddington (1619)	John Hamilton, 4th Earl of Haddington	1645	1669	
Earl of Nithsdale (1620)	Robert Maxwell, 1st Earl of Nithsdale	1620	1646	Died
Earl of Nithsdale (1620)	Robert Maxwell, 2nd Earl of Nithsdale	1646	1667	
Earl of Galloway (1623)	Alexander Stewart, 1st Earl of Galloway	1623	1649	Died
Earl of Galloway (1623)	James Stewart, 2nd Earl of Galloway	1649	1671	
Earl of Seaforth (1623)	George Mackenzie, 2nd Earl of Seaforth	1633	1651	
Earl of Lauderdale (1624)	John Maitland, 1st Earl of Lauderdale	1624	1645	Died
Earl of Lauderdale (1624)	John Maitland, 2nd Earl of Lauderdale	1645	1682	
Earl of Annandale (1625)	John Murray, 1st Earl of Annandale	1625	1640	Died
Earl of Annandale (1625)	James Murray, 2nd Earl of Annandale	1640	1658	
Earl of Tullibardine (1628)	Patrick Murray, 1st Earl of Tullibardine	1628	1644	Died
Earl of Tullibardine (1628)	James Murray, 2nd Earl of Tullibardine	1644	1670	
Earl of Carrick (1628)	John Stewart, 1st Earl of Carrick	1628	1646	Died, title extinct
Earl of Atholl (1629)	John Murray, 1st Earl of Atholl	1629	1642	Died
Earl of Atholl (1629)	John Murray, 2nd Earl of Atholl	1642	1703	
Earl of Lothian (1631)	William Kerr, 1st Earl of Lothian	1631	1675	
Earl of Airth (1633)	William Graham, 1st Earl of Airth	1633	1661	
Earl of Lindsay (1633)	John Lindsay, 1st Earl of Lindsay	1633	1678	Succeeded to the more senior Earldom of Crawford, see above
Earl of Loudoun (1633)	John Campbell, 1st Earl of Loudoun	1633	1662	
Earl of Kinnoull (1633)	George Hay, 2nd Earl of Kinnoull	1634	1644	Died
Earl of Kinnoull (1633)	George Hay, 3rd Earl of Kinnoull	1644	1650	
Earl of Dumfries (1633)	William Crichton, 1st Earl of Dumfries	1633	1643	Died
Earl of Dumfries (1633)	William Crichton, 2nd Earl of Dumfries	1643	1691	
Earl of Queensberry (1633)	William Douglas, 1st Earl of Queensberry	1633	1640	Died
Earl of Queensberry (1633)	James Douglas, 2nd Earl of Queensberry	1640	1671	
Earl of Stirling (1633)	William Alexander, 1st Earl of Stirling	1633	1640	Died
Earl of Stirling (1633)	William Alexander, 2nd Earl of Stirling	1640	1640	Died
Earl of Stirling (1633)	Henry Alexander, 3rd Earl of Stirling	1640	1644	Died
Earl of Stirling (1633)	Henry Alexander, 4th Earl of Stirling	1644	1691	
Earl of Elgin (1633)	Thomas Bruce, 1st Earl of Elgin	1633	1663	
Earl of Southesk (1633)	David Carnegie, 1st Earl of Southesk	1633	1658	
Earl of Traquair (1633)	John Stewart, 1st Earl of Traquair	1633	1659	
Earl of Ancram (1633)	Robert Kerr, 1st Earl of Ancram	1633	1654	
Earl of Wemyss (1633)	John Wemyss, 1st Earl of Wemyss	1633	1649	Died
Earl of Wemyss (1633)	David Wemyss, 2nd Earl of Wemyss	1649	1679	
Earl of Dalhousie (1633)	William Ramsay, 1st Earl of Dalhousie	1633	1672	
Earl of Findlater (1638)	James Ogilvy, 1st Earl of Findlater	1638	1653	
Earl of Lanark (1639)	William Hamilton, 1st Earl of Lanark	1639	1651	Succeeded to the Dukedom of Hamilton, see above
Earl of Airlie (1639)	James Ogilvy, 1st Earl of Airlie	1639	1665	
Earl of Carnwath (1639)	Robert Dalzell, 1st Earl of Carnwath	1639	1654	
Earl of Callendar (1641)	James Livingston, 1st Earl of Callendar	1641	1674	New creation
Earl of Leven (1641)	Alexander Leslie, 1st Earl of Leven	1641	1661	New creation
Earl of Forth (1642)	Patrick Ruthven, 1st Earl of Forth	1642	1651	New creation
Earl of Irvine (1642)	James Campbell, 1st Earl of Irvine	1642	1654	New creation; died, Earldom extinct; the Lordship Kintyre passed to the Marquess of Argyll
Earl of Hartfell (1643)	William Murray, 1st Earl of Dysart	1643	1655	New creation
Earl of Dysart (1643)	Robert Dalzell, 1st Earl of Carnwath	1643	1654	New creation
Earl of Dirletoun (1646)	James Maxwell, 1st Earl of Dirletoun	1646	1650	New creation
Earl of Panmure (1646)	Patrick Maule, 1st Earl of Panmure	1646	1661	New creation
Earl of Selkirk (1646)	William Hamilton, 1st Earl of Selkirk	1646	1694	New creation
Earl of Tweeddale (1646)	John Hay, 1st Earl of Tweeddale	1646	1653	New creation
Earl of Northesk (1647)	John Carnegie, 1st Earl of Northesk	1647	1667	New creation
Earl of Kincardine (1647)	Edward Bruce, 1st Earl of Kincardine	1647	1662	New creation
Viscount of Falkland (1620)	Lucius Cary, 2nd Viscount of Falkland	1633	1643	Died
Viscount of Falkland (1620)	Lucius Cary, 3rd Viscount of Falkland	1643	1649	Died
Viscount of Falkland (1620)	Henry Cary, 4th Viscount of Falkland	1649	1663	
Viscount of Dunbar (1620)	Henry Constable, 1st Viscount of Dunbar	1620	1645	Died
Viscount of Dunbar (1620)	John Constable, 2nd Viscount of Dunbar	1645	1668	
Viscount of Stormont (1621)	Mungo Murray, 2nd Viscount of Stormont	1631	1642	Died, title succeeded by the Earl of Annandale
Viscount of Aboyne (1632)	James Gordon, 2nd Viscount Aboyne	1636	1649	Died, title extinct
Viscount of Kenmure (1633)	John Gordon, 3rd Viscount of Kenmure	1639	1643	Died
Viscount of Kenmure (1633)	Robert Gordon, 4th Viscount of Kenmure	1643	1663	
Viscount of Arbuthnott (1641)	Robert Arbuthnot, 1st Viscount of Arbuthnott	1641	1655	New creation
Viscount of Dudhope (1641)	John Scrymgeour, 1st Viscount of Dudhope	1641	1643	New creation; died
Viscount of Dudhope (1641)	James Scrymgeour, 2nd Viscount of Dudhope	1643	1644	Died
Viscount of Dudhope (1641)	John Scrymgeour, 3rd Viscount of Dudhope	1644	1668	
Viscount of Frendraught (1642)	James Crichton, 1st Viscount of Frendraught	1642	1650	New creation
Viscount of Newburgh (1647)	James Levingston, 1st Viscount of Newburgh	1647	1670	New creation
Lord Somerville (1430)	Hugh Somerville, 9th Lord Somerville	1618	1640	Died
Lord Somerville (1430)	James Somerville, 10th Lord Somerville	1640	1677	
Lord Forbes (1442)	Arthur Forbes, 9th Lord Forbes	1606	1641	Died
Lord Forbes (1442)	Alexander Forbes, 10th Lord Forbes	1641	1672	
Lord Saltoun (1445)	Alexander Abernethy, 9th Lord Saltoun	1612	1668	
Lord Gray (1445)	Andrew Gray, 7th Lord Gray	1611	1663	
Lord Sinclair (1449)	John Sinclair, 9th Lord Sinclair	1615	1676	
Lord Borthwick (1452)	John Borthwick, 9th Lord Borthwick	1623	1675	
Lord Boyd (1454)	Robert Boyd, 8th Lord Boyd	1628	1640	Died
Lord Boyd (1454)	James Boyd, 9th Lord Boyd	1640	1654	
Lord Oliphant (1455)	Patrick Oliphant, 6th Lord Oliphant	1631	1680	
Lord Cathcart (1460)	Alan Cathcart, 6th Lord Cathcart	1628	1709	
Lord Lovat (1464)	Hugh Fraser, 7th Lord Lovat	1633	1646	Died
Lord Lovat (1464)	Hugh Fraser, 8th Lord Lovat	1646	1672	
Lord Hay of Yester (1488)	John Hay, 8th Lord Hay of Yester	1609	1653	Created Earl of Tweeddale, see above
Lord Sempill (1489)	Francis Sempill, 6th Lord Sempill	1639	1644	Died
Lord Sempill (1489)	Robert Sempill, 7th Lord Sempill	1644	1675	
Lord Herries of Terregles (1490)	John Maxwell, 7th Lord Herries of Terregles	1631	1677	
Lord Ross (1499)	William Ross, 8th Lord Ross	1636	1640	Died
Lord Ross (1499)	Robert Ross, 9th Lord Ross	1640	1648	Died
Lord Ross (1499)	William Ross, 10th Lord Ross	1648	1656	
Lord Elphinstone (1509)	Alexander Elphinstone, 5th Lord Elphinstone	1638	1648	Died
Lord Elphinstone (1509)	Alexander Elphinstone, 6th Lord Elphinstone	1648	1654	
Lord Ochiltree (1543)	James Stewart, 4th Lord Ochiltree	1615	1658	
Lord Torphichen (1564)	John Sandilands, 5th Lord Torphichen	1637	1649	Died
Lord Torphichen (1564)	Walter Sandilands, 6th Lord Torphichen	1649	1696	
Lord Spynie (1590)	Alexander Lindsay, 2nd Lord Spynie	1607	1646	Died
Lord Spynie (1590)	George Lindsay, 3rd Lord Spynie	1646	1671	
Lord Lindores (1600)	Patrick Leslie, 2nd Lord Lindores	1608	1649	Died
Lord Lindores (1600)	James Leslie, 3rd Lord Lindores	1649	1666	
Lord Colville of Culross (1604)	James Colville, 2nd Lord Colville of Culross	1629	1654	
Lord Balmerinoch (1606)	John Elphinstone, 2nd Lord Balmerino	1612	1649	Died
Lord Balmerinoch (1606)	John Elphinstone, 3rd Lord Balmerino	1649	1704	
Lord Blantyre (1606)	Walter Stewart, 3rd Lord Blantyre	1638	1641	Died
Lord Blantyre (1606)	Alexander Stewart, 4th Lord Blantyre	1641	1670	
Lord Coupar (1607)	James Elphinstone, 1st Lord Coupar	1607	1669	
Lord Balfour of Burleigh (1607)	Robert Balfour, 2nd Lord Balfour of Burleigh	1619	1663	
Lord Cranstoun (1609)	John Cranstoun, 2nd Lord Cranstoun	1627	1648	Died
Lord Cranstoun (1609)	William Cranstoun, 3rd Lord Cranstoun	1648	1664	
Lord Maderty (1609)	John Drummond, 2nd Lord Madderty	1623	1647	Died
Lord Maderty (1609)	David Drummond, 3rd Lord Madderty	1647	1692	
Lord Dingwall (1609)	Elizabeth Preston, 2nd Lady Dingwall	1628	1684	
Lord Cardross (1610)	David Erskine, 2nd Lord Cardross	1634	1671	
Lord Melville of Monymaill (1616)	John Melville, 3rd Lord Melville	1635	1643	Died
Lord Melville of Monymaill (1616)	George Melville, 4th Lord Melville	1643	1707	
Lord Kintyre (1626)	James Campbell, 1st Lord Kintyre	1626	1645	Created Earl of Irvine in 1642, see above.
Lord Aston of Forfar (1627)	Walter Aston, 1st Lord Aston of Forfar	1627	1639	Died
Lord Aston of Forfar (1627)	Walter Aston, 2nd Lord Aston of Forfar	1639	1678	
Lord Barrett (1627)	Edward Barrett, 1st Lord Barrett of Newburgh	1627	1645	Died, title extinct
Lord Fairfax of Cameron (1627)	Thomas Fairfax, 1st Lord Fairfax of Cameron	1627	1640	Died
Lord Fairfax of Cameron (1627)	Ferdinando Fairfax, 2nd Lord Fairfax of Cameron	1640	1648	Died
Lord Fairfax of Cameron (1627)	Thomas Fairfax, 3rd Lord Fairfax of Cameron	1648	1671	
Lord Napier (1627)	Archibald Napier, 1st Lord Napier	1627	1645	Died
Lord Napier (1627)	Archibald Napier, 2nd Lord Napier	1645	1660	
Lord Reay (1628)	Donald Mackay, 1st Lord Reay	1628	1649	Died
Lord Reay (1628)	John Mackay, 2nd Lord Reay	1649	1681	
Lord Cramond (1628)	Elizabeth Richardson, 1st Lady Cramond	1628	1651	
Lord Lindsay of Balcarres (1633)	David Lindsay, 1st Lord Balcarres	1633	1641	Died
Lord Lindsay of Balcarres (1633)	Alexander Lindsay, 2nd Lord Balcarres	1641	1659	
Lord Livingston of Almond (1633)	James Livingston, 1st Lord Livingston of Almond	1633	1674	Created Earl of Callendar, see above
Lord Forbes of Pitsligo (1633)	Alexander Forbes, 2nd Lord Forbes of Pitsligo	1636	1690	
Lord Kirkcudbright (1633)	Robert Maclellan, 1st Lord Kirkcudbright	1633	1641	Died
Lord Kirkcudbright (1633)	Thomas Maclellan, 2nd Lord Kirkcudbright	1641	1647	Died
Lord Kirkcudbright (1633)	John Maclellan, 3rd Lord Kirkcudbright	1647	1664	
Lord Fraser (1633)	Andrew Fraser, 2nd Lord Fraser	1636	1674	
Lord Forrester (1633)	George Forrester, 1st Lord Forrester	1633	1654	
Lord Innerwick (1638)	James Maxwell, 1st Lord Innerwick	1638	1650	Created Earl of Dirletoun, see above
Lord Rosehill and Inglismaldie (1639)	John Carnegie, 1st Lord Rosehill and Inglismaldie	1639	1667	Created Earl of Northesk, see above
Lord Ruthven of Ettrick (1639)	Patrick Ruthven, 1st Lord Ruthven of Ettrick	1639	1651	Created Earl of Forth, see above
Lord Bargany (1641)	John Hamilton, 1st Lord Bargany	1641	1658	New creation
Lord Balvaird (1641)	Andrew Murray, 1st Lord Balvaird	1641	1644	New creation; died
Lord Balvaird (1641)	David Murray, 2nd Lord Balvaird	1644	1664	
Lord Eythin (1642)	James King, 1st Lord Eythin	1642	1652	New creation
Lord Banff (1642)	George Ogilvy, 1st Lord Banff	1642	1663	New creation
Lord Elibank (1643)	Patrick Murray, 1st Lord Elibank	1643	1649	New creation; died
Lord Elibank (1643)	Patrick Murray, 2nd Lord Elibank	1649	1661	
Lord Dunkeld (1645)	James Galloway, 1st Lord Dunkeld	1645	1660	New creation
Lord Falconer of Halkerton (1646)	Alexander Falconer, 1st Lord Falconer of Halkerton	1646	1671	New creation
Lord Abercrombie (1647)	James Sandilands, 1st Lord Abercrombie	1647	1658	New creation
Lord Belhaven and Stenton (1647)	John Hamilton, 1st Lord Belhaven and Stenton	1647	1679	New creation
Lord Cochrane of Dundonald (1647)	William Cochrane, Lord Cochrane of Dundonald	1647	1685	New creation
Lord Carmichael (1647)	James Carmichael, 1st Lord Carmichael	1647	1672	New creation

== Peerage of Ireland ==
Title	Holder	Date gained	Date lost	Notes
Marquess of Ormonde (1642)	James Butler, 1st Duke of Ormonde	1642	1688	New creation
Marquess of Antrim (1645)	Randal MacDonnell, 1st Marquess of Antrim	1645	1683	New creation
Marquess of Clanricarde (1646)	Ulick Burke, 1st Marquess of Clanricarde	1646	1657	New creation
Earl of Kildare (1316)	George FitzGerald, 16th Earl of Kildare	1620	1660	
Earl of Ormond (1328)	James Butler, 12th Earl of Ormonde	1633	1688	Created Marquess of Ormonde, see above
Earl of Waterford (1446)	John Talbot, 10th Earl of Waterford	1630	1654	
Earl of Clanricarde (1543)	Ulick Burke, 5th Earl of Clanricarde	1635	1657	Created Marquess of Clanricarde, see above
Earl of Thomond (1543)	Barnabas O'Brien, 6th Earl of Thomond	1639	1657	
Earl of Castlehaven (1616)	James Tuchet, 3rd Earl of Castlehaven	1630	1684	
Earl of Cork (1620)	Richard Boyle, 1st Earl of Cork	1620	1643	Died
Earl of Cork (1620)	Richard Boyle, 2nd Earl of Cork	1643	1698	
Earl of Antrim (1620)	Randal MacDonnell, 2nd Earl of Antrim	1636	1682	Created Marquess of Antrim, see above
Earl of Westmeath (1621)	Richard Nugent, 1st Earl of Westmeath	1621	1642	Died
Earl of Westmeath (1621)	Richard Nugent, 2nd Earl of Westmeath	1642	1684	
Earl of Roscommon (1622)	James Dillon, 1st Earl of Roscommon	1622	1642	Died
Earl of Roscommon (1622)	Robert Dillon, 2nd Earl of Roscommon	1642	1642	Died
Earl of Roscommon (1622)	James Dillon, 3rd Earl of Roscommon	1642	1649	Died
Earl of Roscommon (1622)	Wentworth Dillon, 4th Earl of Roscommon	1649	1685	
Earl of Londonderry (1622)	Robert Ridgeway, 2nd Earl of Londonderry	1631	1641	Died
Earl of Londonderry (1622)	Weston Ridgeway, 3rd Earl of Londonderry	1641	1672	
Earl of Meath (1627)	William Brabazon, 1st Earl of Meath	1627	1651	
Earl of Barrymore (1628)	David Barry, 1st Earl of Barrymore	1628	1642	Died
Earl of Barrymore (1628)	Richard Barry, 2nd Earl of Barrymore	1642	1694	
Earl of Carbery (1628)	Richard Vaughan, 2nd Earl of Carbery	1634	1687	
Earl of Fingall (1628)	Christopher Plunkett, 2nd Earl of Fingall	1637	1649	Died
Earl of Fingall (1628)	Luke Plunkett, 3rd Earl of Fingall	1649	1684	
Earl of Downe (1628)	William Pope, 1st Earl of Downe	1628	1640	Died
Earl of Downe (1628)	Thomas Pope, 2nd Earl of Downe	1640	1660	
Earl of Desmond (1628)	George Feilding, 1st Earl of Desmond	1628	1665	
Earl of Ardglass (1645)	Thomas Cromwell, 1st Earl of Ardglass	1645	1653	New creation
Earl of Leinster (1646)	Robert Cholmondeley, 1st Earl of Leinster	1646	1659	New creation
Earl of Donegall (1647)	Arthur Chichester, 1st Earl of Donegall	1647	1675	New creation
Earl of Cavan (1647)	Charles Lambart, 1st Earl of Cavan	1647	1660	New creation
Earl of Clanbrassil (1647)	James Hamilton, 1st Earl of Clanbrassil	1647	1659	New creation
Viscount Gormanston (1478)	Nicholas Preston, 6th Viscount Gormanston	1630	1643	Died
Viscount Gormanston (1478)	Jenico Preston, 7th Viscount Gormanston	1643	1691	
Viscount Mountgarret (1550)	Richard Butler, 3rd Viscount Mountgarret	1602	1651	
Viscount Grandison (1621)	William Villiers, 2nd Viscount Grandison	1630	1643	Died
Viscount Grandison (1621)	John Villiers, 3rd Viscount Grandison	1643	1661	
Viscount Wilmot (1621)	Charles Wilmot, 1st Viscount Wilmot	1621	1644	Died
Viscount Wilmot (1621)	Henry Wilmot, 2nd Viscount Wilmot	1644	1658	
Viscount Valentia (1621/1622)	Henry Power, 1st Viscount Valentia	1621	1642	Died; succession according to 1622 regrant
Viscount Valentia (1621/1622)	Francis Annesley, 1st Viscount Valentia	1642	1660	
Viscount Moore (1621)	Charles Moore, 2nd Viscount Moore	1627	1643	Died
Viscount Moore (1621)	Henry Moore, 3rd Viscount Moore	1643	1675	
Viscount Dillon (1622)	Thomas Dillon, 4th Viscount Dillon	1630	1672	
Viscount Loftus (1622)	Adam Loftus, 1st Viscount Loftus	1622	1643	Died
Viscount Loftus (1622)	Edward Loftus, 2nd Viscount Loftus	1643	1680	
Viscount Beaumont of Swords (1622)	Sapcote Beaumont, 2nd Viscount Beaumont of Swords	1625	1658	
Viscount Netterville (1622)	Nicholas Netterville, 1st Viscount Netterville	1622	1654	
Viscount Montgomery (1622)	Hugh Montgomery, 2nd Viscount Montgomery	1636	1642	Died
Viscount Montgomery (1622)	Hugh Montgomery, 3rd Viscount Montgomery	1642	1663	
Viscount Claneboye (1622)	James Hamilton, 1st Viscount Claneboye	1622	1644	Died
Viscount Claneboye (1622)	James Hamilton, 2nd Viscount Claneboye	1644	1659	Created Earl of Clanbrassil, see above
Viscount Magennis (1623)	Arthur Magennis, 3rd Viscount Magennis	1639	1683	
Viscount Lecale (1624)	Thomas Cromwell, 1st Viscount Lecale	1624	1653	Created Earl of Ardglass, see above
Viscount Chichester (1625)	Edward Chichester, 1st Viscount Chichester	1625	1648	Created Earl of Donegall, see above
Viscount Kilmorey (1625)	Robert Needham, 2nd Viscount Kilmorey	1631	1653	
Viscount Somerset (1626)	Thomas Somerset, 1st Viscount Somerset	1626	1649	Died, title extinct
Viscount Baltinglass (1627)	Thomas Roper, 2nd Viscount Baltinglass	1637	1670	
Viscount Castleton (1627)	Nicholas Saunderson, 2nd Viscount Castleton	1630	1640	Died
Viscount Castleton (1627)	Nicholas Saunderson, 3rd Viscount Castleton	1640	1641	Died
Viscount Castleton (1627)	Peregrine Saunderson, 4th Viscount Castleton	1641	1650	
Viscount Killultagh (1627)	Edward Conway, 2nd Viscount Killultagh	1631	1655	
Viscount Mayo (1627)	Miles Bourke, 2nd Viscount Mayo	1629	1649	Died
Viscount Mayo (1627)	Theobald Bourke, 3rd Viscount Mayo	1649	1652	
Viscount Sarsfield (1627)	William Sarsfield, 2nd Viscount Sarsfield	1636	1648	Died
Viscount Sarsfield (1627)	David Sarsfield, 3rd Viscount Sarsfield	1648	1687	
Viscount Boyle of Kinalmeaky (1628)	Lewis Boyle, 1st Viscount Boyle of Kinalmeaky	1628	1642	Died
Viscount Boyle of Kinalmeaky (1628)	Richard Boyle, 2nd Viscount Boyle of Kinalmeaky	1642	1698	Succeeded as Earl of Cork, see above
Viscount Chaworth (1628)	John Chaworth, 2nd Viscount Chaworth	1639	1644	Died
Viscount Chaworth (1628)	Patrick Chaworth, 3rd Viscount Chaworth	1644	1693	
Viscount Savile (1628)	Thomas Savile, 1st Viscount Savile	1628	1659	
Viscount Cholmondeley (1628)	Robert Cholmondeley, 1st Viscount Cholmondeley	1628	1659	Created Earl of Leinster, see above
Viscount Lumley (1628)	Richard Lumley, 1st Viscount Lumley	1628	1663	
Viscount Taaffe (1628)	John Taaffe, 1st Viscount Taaffe	1628	1642	Died
Viscount Taaffe (1628)	Theobald Taaffe, 2nd Viscount Taaffe	1642	1677	
Viscount Molyneux (1628)	Richard Molyneux, 2nd Viscount Molyneux	1636	1654	
Viscount Monson (1628)	William Monson, 1st Viscount Monson	1628	1660	
Viscount Muskerry (1628)	Charles MacCarthy, 1st Viscount Muskerry	1628	1641	Died
Viscount Muskerry (1628)	Donough MacCarty, 2nd Viscount Muskerry	1640	1665	
Viscount Strangford (1628)	Philip Smythe, 2nd Viscount Strangford	1635	1708	
Viscount Scudamore (1628)	John Scudamore, 1st Viscount Scudamore	1628	1671	
Viscount Wenman (1628)	Richard Wenman, 1st Viscount Wenman	1628	1640	Died
Viscount Wenman (1628)	Thomas Wenman, 2nd Viscount Wenman	1640	1665	
Viscount Ranelagh (1628)	Roger Jones, 1st Viscount Ranelagh	1628	1643	Died
Viscount Ranelagh (1628)	Arthur Jones, 2nd Viscount Ranelagh	1643	1669	
Viscount Bourke of Clanmories (1629)	Thomas Bourke, 2nd Viscount Bourke	1635	1650	
Viscount FitzWilliam (1629)	Thomas FitzWilliam, 1st Viscount FitzWilliam	1629	1650	
Viscount Fairfax of Emley (1629)	Thomas Fairfax, 2nd Viscount Fairfax of Emley	1636	1641	Died
Viscount Fairfax of Emley (1629)	William Fairfax, 3rd Viscount Fairfax of Emley	1641	1648	Died
Viscount Fairfax of Emley (1629)	Thomas Fairfax, 4th Viscount Fairfax of Emley	1648	1651	
Viscount Ikerrin (1629)	Pierce Butler, 1st Viscount Ikerrin	1629	1674	
Viscount Clanmalier (1631)	Lewis O'Dempsey, 2nd Viscount Clanmalier	1638	1683	
Viscount Cullen (1642)	Charles Cokayne, 1st Viscount Cullen	1642	1661	New creation
Viscount Carrington (1643)	Charles Smyth, 1st Viscount Carrington	1643	1665	New creation
Viscount Tracy (1643)	John Tracy, 1st Viscount Tracy	1643	1648	New creation; died
Viscount Tracy (1643)	Robert Tracy, 2nd Viscount Tracy	1648	1662	
Viscount Bulkeley (1644)	Thomas Bulkeley, 1st Viscount Bulkeley	1644	1659	New creation
Viscount Bellomont (1645)	Henry Bard, 1st Viscount Bellomont	1645	1656	New creation
Viscount Brouncker (1645)	William Brouncker, 1st Viscount Brouncker	1645	1645	New creation; died
Viscount Brouncker (1645)	William Brouncker, 2nd Viscount Brouncker	1645	1684	New creation
Viscount Ogle (1645)	William Ogle, 1st Viscount Ogle	1645	1682	New creation
Viscount Barnewall (1646)	Nicholas Barnewall, 1st Viscount Barnewall	1646	1663	New creation
Viscount Galmoye (1646)	Edward Butler, 1st Viscount of Galmoye	1646	1653	New creation
Baron Athenry (1172)	Richard III de Bermingham	1612	1645	Died
Baron Athenry (1172)	Francis de Bermingham, 12th Baron Athenry	1645	1677	
Baron Kingsale (1223)	Gerald de Courcy, 19th Baron Kingsale	1628	1642	Died
Baron Kingsale (1223)	Patrick de Courcy, 20th Baron Kingsale	1642	1663	
Baron Kerry (1223)	Patrick Fitzmaurice, 19th Baron Kerry	1630	1661	
Baron Slane (1370)	William Fleming, 14th Baron Slane	1629	1641	Died
Baron Slane (1370)	Charles Fleming, 15th Baron Slane	1641	1661	
Baron Howth (1425)	Nicholas St Lawrence, 11th Baron Howth	1619	1643	Died
Baron Howth (1425)	William St Lawrence, 12th Baron Howth	1643	1671	
Baron Trimlestown (1461)	Matthias Barnewall, 8th Baron Trimlestown	1539	1667	
Baron Dunsany (1462)	Patrick Plunkett, 9th Baron of Dunsany	1603	1668	
Baron Power (1535)	John Power, 5th Baron Power	1607	1661	
Baron Dunboyne (1541)	Edmond Butler, 3rd/13th Baron Dunboyne	1624	1640	Died
Baron Dunboyne (1541)	James Butler, 4th/14th Baron Dunboyne	1640	1662	
Baron Louth (1541)	Oliver Plunkett, 6th Baron Louth	1629	1679	
Baron Upper Ossory (1541)	Barnaby Fitzpatrick, 6th Baron Upper Ossory	1638	1666	
Baron Inchiquin (1543)	Murrough O'Brien, 6th Baron Inchiquin	1624	1674	
Baron Bourke of Castleconnell (1580)	William Bourke, 6th Baron Bourke of Connell	1635	1665	
Baron Cahir (1583)	Thomas Butler, 3rd Baron Cahir	1627	1648	Died
Baron Cahir (1583)	Pierce Butler, 4th Baron Cahir	1648	1676	
Baron Hamilton (1617)	James Hamilton, 3rd Baron Hamilton of Strabane	1638	1655	
Baron Bourke of Brittas (1618)	Theobald Bourke, 1st Baron Bourke of Brittas	1618	1654	
Baron Lambart (1618)	Charles Lambart, 2nd Baron Lambart	1618	1660	Created Earl of Cavan, see above
Baron Mountjoy (1618)	Mountjoy Blount, 1st Baron Mountjoy	1618	1665	
Baron Castle Stewart (1619)	Andrew Stewart, 3rd Baron Castle Stewart	1639	1650	
Baron Folliot (1620)	Thomas Folliott, 2nd Baron Folliott	1622	1697	
Baron Maynard (1620)	William Maynard, 1st Baron Maynard	1620	1640	Died
Baron Maynard (1620)	William Maynard, 2nd Baron Maynard	1640	1699	
Baron Gorges of Dundalk (1620)	Edward Gorges, 1st Baron Gorges of Dundalk	1620	1650	
Baron Offaly (1620)	Lettice Digby, 1st Baroness Offaly	1620	1658	
Baron Digby (1620)	Robert Digby, 1st Baron Digby	1620	1642	Died
Baron Digby (1620)	Kildare Digby, 2nd Baron Digby	1642	1661	
Baron Hervey (1620)	William Hervey, 1st Baron Hervey	1620	1642	Died, title extinct
Baron Fitzwilliam (1620)	William Fitzwilliam, 1st Baron Fitzwilliam	1620	1644	Died
Baron Fitzwilliam (1620)	William Fitzwilliam, 2nd Baron Fitzwilliam	1644	1658	
Baron Caulfeild (1620)	William Caulfeild, 2nd Baron Caulfeild	1627	1640	Died
Baron Caulfeild (1620)	Toby Caulfeild, 3rd Baron Caulfeild	1640	1642	Died
Baron Caulfeild (1620)	Robert Caulfeild, 4th Baron Caulfeild	1642	1642	Died
Baron Caulfeild (1620)	William Caulfeild, 5th Baron Caulfield	1642	1671	
Baron Aungier (1621)	Gerald Aungier, 2nd Baron Aungier of Longford	1632	1655	
Baron Blayney (1621)	Henry Blayney, 2nd Baron Blayney	1629	1646	Died
Baron Blayney (1621)	Edward Blayney, 3rd Baron Blayney	1646	1669	
Baron Dockwra (1621)	Theodore Dockwra, 2nd Baron Dockwra	1631	1647	Died, title extinct
Baron Esmonde (1622)	Laurence Esmonde, 1st Baron Esmonde	1622	1646	Died, title extinct
Baron Brereton (1624)	William Brereton, 2nd Baron Brereton	1631	1664	
Baron Herbert of Castle Island (1624)	Edward Herbert, 1st Baron Herbert of Castle Island	1624	1648	Died
Baron Herbert of Castle Island (1624)	Richard Herbert, 2nd Baron Herbert of Castle Island	1648	1655	
Baron Baltimore (1625)	Cecilius Calvert, 2nd Baron Baltimore	1632	1675	
Baron Coleraine (1625)	Hugh Hare, 1st Baron Coleraine	1625	1667	
Baron Sherard (1627)	William Sherard, 1st Baron Sherard	1627	1640	Died
Baron Sherard (1627)	Bennet Sherard, 2nd Baron Sherard	1640	1700	
Baron Boyle of Broghill (1628)	Roger Boyle, 1st Baron Boyle of Broghill	1628	1679	
Baron Maguire (1628)	Connor Maguire, 2nd Baron Maguire	1633	1645	Attainted and the barony was forfeited
Baron Mountnorris (1629)	Francis Annesley, 1st Baron Mountnorris	1629	1660	Succeeded to the Viscountcy Valentia, see above
Baron Alington (1642)	William Alington, 1st Baron Alington	1642	1648	New creation; died
Baron Alington (1642)	Giles Alington, 2nd Baron Alington	1648	1659	
Baron Hawley (1646)	Francis Hawley, 1st Baron Hawley	1646	1684	New creation

Preceded by List of peers 1630–1639	Lists of peers by decade 1640–1649	Succeeded by List of peers 1650–1659
