= List of peers 1630–1639 =

This page lists all peers who held extant titles between 1630 and 1639.

== Peerage of England ==
Title	Holder	Date gained	Date lost	Notes
Duke of Cornwall (1337)	Prince Charles	1630	1649	
Duke of Buckingham (1623)	George Villiers, 2nd Duke of Buckingham	1628	1687	
Marquess of Winchester (1551)	John Paulet, 5th Marquess of Winchester	1628	1675	
Earl of Arundel (1138)	Thomas Howard, 21st Earl of Arundel	1604	1646	
Earl of Oxford (1142)	Robert de Vere, 19th Earl of Oxford	1625	1632	Died
Earl of Oxford (1142)	Aubrey de Vere, 20th Earl of Oxford	1632	1703	
Earl of Shrewsbury (1442)	George Talbot, 9th Earl of Shrewsbury	1617	1630	Died
Earl of Shrewsbury (1442)	John Talbot, 10th Earl of Shrewsbury	1630	1654	
Earl of Kent (1465)	Henry Grey, 8th Earl of Kent	1623	1639	Died
Earl of Kent (1465)	Anthony Grey, 9th Earl of Kent	1639	1643	
Earl of Derby (1485)	William Stanley, 6th Earl of Derby	1594	1642	
Earl of Worcester (1514)	Henry Somerset, 5th Earl of Worcester	1628	1646	
Earl of Cumberland (1525)	Francis Clifford, 4th Earl of Cumberland	1605	1641	
Earl of Rutland (1525)	Francis Manners, 6th Earl of Rutland	1612	1632	Died
Earl of Rutland (1525)	George Manners, 7th Earl of Rutland	1632	1641	
Earl of Huntington (1529)	Henry Hastings, 5th Earl of Huntingdon	1604	1643	
Earl of Sussex (1529)	Edward Radclyffe, 6th Earl of Sussex	1629	1643	
Earl of Bath (1536)	Edward Bourchier, 4th Earl of Bath	1623	1636	Died
Earl of Bath (1536)	Henry Bourchier, 5th Earl of Bath	1636	1654	
Earl of Southampton (1547)	Thomas Wriothesley, 4th Earl of Southampton	1624	1667	
Earl of Bedford (1550)	Francis Russell, 4th Earl of Bedford	1627	1641	
Earl of Pembroke (1551)	William Herbert, 3rd Earl of Pembroke	1601	1630	Died
Earl of Pembroke (1551)	Philip Herbert, 4th Earl of Pembroke	1630	1649	
Earl of Devon (1553)	William Courtenay, de jure 3rd Earl of Devon	1557	1630	Died
Earl of Devon (1553)	Francis Courtenay, de jure 4th Earl of Devon	1630	1638	Died
Earl of Devon (1553)	William Courtenay, de jure 5th Earl of Devon	1638	1702	
Earl of Northumberland (1557)	Henry Percy, 9th Earl of Northumberland	1585	1632	Died
Earl of Northumberland (1557)	Algernon Percy, 10th Earl of Northumberland	1632	1668	
Earl of Hertford (1559)	William Seymour, 2nd Earl of Herford	1621	1660	
Earl of Essex (1572)	Robert Devereux, 3rd Earl of Essex	1604	1646	
Earl of Lincoln (1572)	Theophilus Clinton, 4th Earl of Lincoln	1619	1667	
Earl of Nottingham (1596)	Charles Howard, 2nd Earl of Nottingham	1624	1642	
Earl of Suffolk (1603)	Theophilus Howard, 2nd Earl of Suffolk	1626	1640	
Earl of Dorset (1604)	Edward Sackville, 4th Earl of Dorset	1624	1652	
Earl of Exeter (1605)	William Cecil, 2nd Earl of Exeter	1623	1640	
Earl of Montgomery (1605)	Philip Herbert, 1st Earl of Montgomery	1605	1649	Succeeded to the more senior Earldom of Pembroke, see above
Earl of Salisbury (1605)	William Cecil, 2nd Earl of Salisbury	1612	1668	
Earl of Somerset (1613)	Robert Carr, 1st Earl of Somerset	1613	1645	
Earl of Bridgewater (1617)	John Egerton, 1st Earl of Bridgewater	1617	1649	
Countess of Buckingham (1618)	Mary Villiers, Countess of Buckingham	1618	1632	Died, title extinct
Earl of Northampton (1618)	William Compton, 1st Earl of Northampton	1618	1630	Died
Earl of Northampton (1618)	Spencer Compton, 2nd Earl of Northampton	1630	1643	
Earl of Leicester (1618)	Robert Sidney, 2nd Earl of Leicester	1626	1677	
Earl of Warwick (1618)	Robert Rich, 2nd Earl of Warwick	1618	1658	
Earl of Devonshire (1618)	William Cavendish, 3rd Earl of Devonshire	1628	1684	
Earl of March (1619)	James Stewart, 2nd Earl of March	1624	1655	Duke of Lennox in the Peerage of Scotland
Earl of Cambridge (1619)	James Hamilton, 2nd Earl of Cambridge	1625	1649	Marquess of Hamilton in the Peerage of Scotland
Earl of Carlisle (1622)	James Hay, 1st Earl of Carlisle	1622	1636	Died
Earl of Carlisle (1622)	James Hay, 2nd Earl of Carlisle	1636	1660	Died
Earl of Denbigh (1622)	William Feilding, 1st Earl of Denbigh	1622	1643	
Earl of Bristol (1622)	John Digby, 1st Earl of Bristol	1622	1653	
Earl of Middlesex (1622)	Lionel Cranfield, 1st Earl of Middlesex	1622	1645	
Earl of Anglesey (1623)	Christopher Villiers, 1st Earl of Anglesey	1623	1630	Died
Earl of Anglesey (1623)	Charles Villiers, 2nd Earl of Anglesey	1630	1661	
Earl of Holland (1624)	Henry Rich, 1st Earl of Holland	1624	1649	
Earl of Clare (1624)	John Holles, 1st Earl of Clare	1624	1637	
Earl of Clare (1624)	John Holles, 2nd Earl of Clare	1637	1666	
Earl of Bolingbroke (1624)	Oliver St John, 1st Earl of Bolingbroke	1624	1646	
Earl of Westmorland (1624)	Mildmay Fane, 2nd Earl of Westmorland	1629	1666	
Earl of Cleveland (1626)	Thomas Wentworth, 1st Earl of Cleveland	1626	1667	
Earl of Danby (1626)	Henry Danvers, 1st Earl of Danby	1626	1644	
Earl of Manchester (1626)	Henry Montagu, 1st Earl of Manchester	1626	1642	
Earl of Marlborough (1626)	Henry Ley, 2nd Earl of Marlborough	1629	1638	Died
Earl of Marlborough (1626)	James Ley, 3rd Earl of Marlborough	1638	1665	
Earl of Mulgrave (1626)	Edmund Sheffield, 1st Earl of Mulgrave	1626	1646	
Earl of Berkshire (1626)	Thomas Howard, 1st Earl of Berkshire	1626	1669	
Earl of Monmouth (1626)	Robert Carey, 1st Earl of Monmouth	1626	1639	Died
Earl of Monmouth (1626)	Henry Carey, 2nd Earl of Monmouth	1639	1661	
Earl of Banbury (1626)	William Knollys, 1st Earl of Banbury	1626	1632	Died, title extinct
Earl of Norwich (1626)	Edward Denny, 1st Earl of Norwich	1626	1637	Died, title extinct
Earl Rivers (1626)	Thomas Darcy, 1st Earl Rivers	1626	1640	
Earl of Lindsey (1626)	Robert Bertie, 1st Earl of Lindsey	1626	1642	
Earl of Sunderland (1627)	Emanuel Scrope, 1st Earl of Sunderland	1627	1630	Died, title extinct
Earl of Newcastle-upon-Tyne (1628)	William Cavendish, 1st Earl of Newcastle-upon-Tyne	1628	1676	
Earl of Dover (1628)	Henry Carey, 1st Earl of Dover	1628	1666	
Earl of Peterborough (1628)	John Mordaunt, 1st Earl of Peterborough	1628	1643	
Earl of Stamford (1628)	Henry Grey, 1st Earl of Stamford	1628	1673	
Earl of Winchilsea (1628)	Elizabeth Finch, 1st Countess of Winchilsea	1628	1634	Died
Earl of Winchilsea (1628)	Thomas Finch, 2nd Earl of Winchilsea	1634	1639	Died
Earl of Winchilsea (1628)	Heneage Finch, 3rd Earl of Winchilsea	1639	1689	
Earl of Kingston-upon-Hull (1628)	Robert Pierrepont, 1st Earl of Kingston-upon-Hull	1628	1643	
Earl of Carnarvon (1628)	Robert Dormer, 1st Earl of Carnarvon	1628	1643	
Earl of Newport (1628)	Mountjoy Blount, 1st Earl of Newport	1628	1666	
Earl of Chesterfield (1628)	Philip Stanhope, 1st Earl of Chesterfield	1628	1656	
Earl of Thanet (1628)	Nicholas Tufton, 1st Earl of Thanet	1628	1632	Died
Earl of Thanet (1628)	John Tufton, 2nd Earl of Thanet	1632	1664	
Earl of St Albans (1628)	Richard Burke, 1st Earl of St Albans	1628	1635	Died
Earl of St Albans (1628)	Ulick Burke, 2nd Earl of St Albans	1635	1657	Earl of Clanricarde in the Peerage of Ireland
Earl of Portland (1633)	Richard Weston, 1st Earl of Portland	1633	1635	New creation; died
Earl of Portland (1633)	Jerome Weston, 2nd Earl of Portland	1635	1663	
Viscount Montagu (1554)	Francis Browne, 3rd Viscount Montagu	1629	1682	
Viscount Purbeck (1618)	John Villiers, 1st Viscount Purbeck	1619	1657	
Viscount Saye and Sele (1624)	William Fiennes, 1st Viscount Saye and Sele	1624	1662	
Viscount Wimbledon (1625)	Edward Cecil, 1st Viscount Wimbledon	1625	1638	Died, title extinct
Viscount Savage (1626)	Thomas Savage, 1st Viscount Savage	1626	1635	
Viscount Savage (1626)	John Savage, 2nd Earl Rivers	1635	1654	
Viscount Conway (1627)	Edward Conway, 1st Viscount Conway	1627	1631	Died
Viscount Conway (1627)	Edward Conway, 2nd Viscount Conway	1631	1655	
Viscount Bayning (1628)	Paul Bayning, 2nd Viscount Bayning	1629	1638	Died, title extinct
Viscount Campden (1628)	Edward Noel, 2nd Viscount Campden	1629	1643	
Viscount Dorchester (1628)	Dudley Carleton, 1st Viscount Dorchester	1628	1632	Died, title extinct
Viscount Wentworth (1628)	Thomas Wentworth, 1st Viscount Wentworth	1628	1641	
Baron de Ros (1264)	Katherine Manners, 19th Baroness de Ros	1632	1649	Title previously held by the Earl of Rutland
Baron de Clifford (1299)	Anne Clifford, 14th Baroness de Clifford	1605	1676	
Baron Morley (1299)	Henry Parker, 14th Baron Morley	1622	1655	
Baron Dacre (1321)	Richard Lennard, 13th Baron Dacre	1616	1630	Died
Baron Dacre (1321)	Francis Lennard, 14th Baron Dacre	1630	1662	
Baron Grey of Ruthyn (1325)	Charles Longueville, 12th Baron Grey de Ruthyn	1639	1643	Title previously held by the Earls of Kent
Baron Berkeley (1421)	George Berkeley, 8th Baron Berkeley	1613	1658	
Baron Dudley (1440)	Edward Sutton, 5th Baron Dudley	1586	1643	
Baron Stourton (1448)	Edward Stourton, 10th Baron Stourton	1588	1633	Died
Baron Stourton (1448)	William Stourton, 11th Baron Stourton	1633	1672	
Baron Willoughby de Broke (1491)	Margaret Greville, 6th Baroness Willoughby de Broke	1628	1631	Died
Baron Willoughby de Broke (1491)	Greville Verney, 7th Baron Willoughby de Broke	1631	1642	
Baron Monteagle (1514)	Henry Parker, 5th Baron Monteagle	1622	1655	
Baron Vaux of Harrowden (1523)	Edward Vaux, 4th Baron Vaux of Harrowden	1595	1661	
Baron Sandys of the Vine (1529)	Elizabeth Sandys, 5th Baroness Sandys	1629	1645	
Baron Windsor (1529)	Thomas Windsor, 6th Baron Windsor	1605	1642	
Baron Eure (1544)	William Eure, 4th Baron Eure	1617	1646	
Baron Wharton (1545)	Philip Wharton, 4th Baron Wharton	1625	1695	
Baron Willoughby of Parham (1547)	Francis Willoughby, 5th Baron Willoughby of Parham	1618	1666	
Baron Darcy of Aston (1548)	John Darcy, 3rd Baron Darcy of Aston	1602	1635	Died, title extinct
Baron Paget (1552)	William Paget, 5th Baron Paget	1629	1678	
Baron North (1554)	Dudley North, 3rd Baron North	1600	1666	
Baron Chandos (1554)	George Brydges, 6th Baron Chandos	1621	1655	
Baron De La Warr (1570)	Charles West, 5th Baron De La Warr	1628	1687	
Baron Norreys (1572)	Elizabeth Wray, 3rd Baroness Norreys	1622	1645	
Baron (A)bergavenny (1604)	Henry Nevill, 2nd Baron Bergavenny	1622	1641	
Baron Gerard (1603)	Dutton Gerard, 3rd Baron Gerard	1622	1640	
Baron Petre (1603)	William Petre, 2nd Baron Petre	1613	1637	Died
Baron Petre (1603)	Robert Petre, 3rd Baron Petre	1637	1638	
Baron Petre (1603)	William Petre, 4th Baron Petre	1638	1684	
Baron Spencer (1603)	William Spencer, 2nd Baron Spencer of Wormleighton	1627	1636	Died
Baron Spencer (1603)	Henry Spencer, 3rd Baron Spencer of Wormleighton	1636	1643	
Baron Wotton (1603)	Thomas Wotton, 2nd Baron Wotton	1628	1630	Died, title extinct
Baron Arundell of Wardour (1605)	Thomas Arundell, 1st Baron Arundell of Wardour	1605	1639	Died
Baron Arundell of Wardour (1605)	Thomas Arundell, 2nd Baron Arundell of Wardour	1639	1643	
Baron Stanhope of Harrington (1605)	Charles Stanhope, 2nd Baron Stanhope	1621	1675	
Baron Clifton (1608)	Katherine Clifton, 2nd Baroness Clifton	1618	1637	Died, title succeeded by the Duke of Lennox
Baron Teynham (1616)	John Roper, 3rd Baron Teynham	1628	1673	
Baron Brooke (1621)	Robert Greville, 2nd Baron Brooke	1628	1643	
Baron Montagu of Boughton (1621)	Edward Montagu, 1st Baron Montagu of Boughton	1621	1644	
Baron Grey of Warke (1624)	William Grey, 1st Baron Grey of Werke	1624	1674	
Baron Deincourt (1624)	Francis Leke, 1st Baron Deincourt	1624	1655	
Baron Robartes (1625)	Richard Robartes, 1st Baron Robartes	1625	1634	Died
Baron Robartes (1625)	John Robartes, 2nd Baron Robartes	1625	1685	
Baron Craven (1627)	Willian Craven, 1st Baron Craven	1627	1697	
Baron Fauconberg (1627)	Thomas Belasyse, 1st Baron Fauconberg	1627	1653	
Baron Lovelace (1627)	Richard Lovelace, 1st Baron Lovelace	1627	1634	Died
Baron Lovelace (1627)	John Lovelace, 2nd Baron Lovelace	1634	1670	
Baron Poulett (1627)	John Poulett, 1st Baron Poulett	1627	1649	
Baron Clifford (1628)	Henry Clifford, 1st Baron Clifford	1628	1643	
Baron Brudenell (1628)	Thomas Brudenell, 1st Baron Brudenell	1628	1663	
Baron Hervey (1628)	William Hervey, 1st Baron Hervey	1628	1642	
Baron Strange (1628)	James Stanley, 1st Baron Strange	1628	1651	
Baron Maynard (1628)	William Maynard, 1st Baron Maynard	1628	1640	
Baron Coventry (1628)	Thomas Coventry, 1st Baron Coventry	1628	1640	
Baron Weston (1628)	Richard Weston, 1st Baron Weston	1628	1635	Created Earl of Portland, see above
Baron Goring (1628)	George Goring, 1st Baron Goring	1628	1644	
Baron Mohun of Okehampton (1628)	John Mohun, 1st Baron Mohun of Okehampton	1628	1640	
Baron Savile (1628)	John Savile, 1st Baron Savile of Pontefract	1628	1630	Died, Barony succeeded by the Viscount Savile
Baron Boteler of Brantfield (1628)	John Boteler, 1st Baron Boteler of Brantfield	1628	1637	Died
Baron Boteler of Brantfield (1628)	William Boteler, 2nd Baron Boteler of Brantfield	1637	1657	
Baron Dunsmore (1628)	Francis Leigh, 1st Baron Dunsmore	1628	1653	
Baron Powis (1629)	William Herbert, 1st Baron Powis	1629	1655	
Baron Herbert of Chirbury (1629)	Edward Herbert, 1st Baron Herbert of Cherbury	1629	1648	
Baron Cottington (1631)	Francis Cottington, 1st Baron Cottington	1631	1652	New creation

== Peerage of Scotland ==
Title	Holder	Date gained	Date lost	Notes
Duke of Rothesay (1398)	Charles Stuart, Duke of Rothesay	1630	1649	
Duke of Lennox (1581)	James Stewart, 4th Duke of Lennox	1624	1655	
Marquess of Huntly (1599)	George Gordon, 1st Marquess of Huntly	1599	1636	Died
Marquess of Huntly (1599)	George Gordon, 2nd Marquess of Huntly	1636	1649	
Marquess of Hamilton (1599)	James Hamilton, 3rd Marquess of Hamilton	1625	1649	
Marquess of Douglas (1633)	William Douglas, 1st Marquess of Douglas	1633	1660	
Earl of Angus (1389)	William Douglas, 11th Earl of Angus	1611	1660	Created Marquess of Douglas, see above
Earl of Argyll (1457)	Archibald Campbell, 7th Earl of Argyll	1584	1638	Died
Earl of Argyll (1457)	Archibald Campbell, 8th Earl of Argyll	1638	1661	
Earl of Crawford (1398)	George Lindsay, 14th Earl of Crawford	1622	1633	Died
Earl of Crawford (1398)	Alexander Lindsay, 15th Earl of Crawford	1633	1639	Died
Earl of Crawford (1398)	Ludovic Lindsay, 16th Earl of Crawford	1639	1652	
Earl of Erroll (1452)	Francis Hay, 9th Earl of Erroll	1585	1631	Died
Earl of Erroll (1452)	William Hay, 10th Earl of Erroll	1631	1636	Died
Earl of Erroll (1452)	Gilbert Hay, 11th Earl of Erroll	1636	1674	
Earl Marischal (1458)	William Keith, 6th Earl Marischal	1623	1635	Died
Earl Marischal (1458)	William Keith, 7th Earl Marischal	1635	1671	
Earl of Sutherland (1235)	John Gordon, 14th Earl of Sutherland	1615	1679	
Earl of Mar (1114)	John Erskine, 19th/2nd Earl of Mar	1572	1634	Died
Earl of Mar (1114)	John Erskine, 19th Earl of Mar	1634	1654	
Earl of Rothes (1458)	John Leslie, 6th Earl of Rothes	1611	1641	
Earl of Morton (1458)	William Douglas, 7th Earl of Morton	1606	1648	
Earl of Menteith (1427)	William Graham, 7th Earl of Menteith	1598	1661	
Earl of Glencairn (1488)	James Cunningham, 7th Earl of Glencairn	1578	1630	Died
Earl of Glencairn (1488)	William Cunningham, 8th Earl of Glencairn	1630	1631	Died
Earl of Glencairn (1488)	William Cunningham, 9th Earl of Glencairn	1631	1634	
Earl of Eglinton (1507)	Alexander Montgomerie, 6th Earl of Eglinton	1612	1661	
Earl of Montrose (1503)	James Graham, 5th Earl of Montrose	1626	1650	
Earl of Cassilis (1509)	John Kennedy, 6th Earl of Cassilis	1615	1668	
Earl of Caithness (1455)	George Sinclair, 5th Earl of Caithness	1582	1643	
Earl of Buchan (1469)	James Erskine, 7th Earl of Buchan	1628	1664	
Earl of Moray (1562)	James Stuart, 3rd Earl of Moray	1591	1638	Died
Earl of Moray (1562)	James Stewart, 4th Earl of Moray	1638	1653	
Earl of Linlithgow (1600)	Alexander Livingston, 2nd Earl of Linlithgow	1621	1650	
Earl of Winton (1600)	George Seton, 3rd Earl of Winton	1607	1650	
Earl of Home (1605)	James Home, 2nd Earl of Home	1619	1633	Died
Earl of Home (1605)	James Home, 3rd Earl of Home	1633	1666	
Earl of Perth (1605)	John Drummond, 2nd Earl of Perth	1611	1662	
Earl of Dunfermline (1605)	Charles Seton, 2nd Earl of Dunfermline	1622	1672	
Earl of Wigtown (1606)	John Fleming, 2nd Earl of Wigtown	1619	1650	
Earl of Abercorn (1606)	James Hamilton, 2nd Earl of Abercorn	1618	1670	
Earl of Kinghorne (1606)	John Lyon, 2nd Earl of Kinghorne	1615	1646	
Earl of Roxburghe (1616)	Robert Ker, 1st Earl of Roxburghe	1616	1650	
Earl of Kellie (1619)	Thomas Erskine, 1st Earl of Kellie	1619	1639	Died
Earl of Kellie (1619)	Thomas Erskine, 2nd Earl of Kellie	1639	1643	
Earl of Buccleuch (1619)	Walter Scott, 1st Earl of Buccleuch	1619	1633	Died
Earl of Buccleuch (1619)	Francis Scott, 2nd Earl of Buccleuch	1633	1651	
Earl of Haddington (1619)	Thomas Hamilton, 1st Earl of Haddington	1619	1637	Died
Earl of Haddington (1619)	Thomas Hamilton, 2nd Earl of Haddington	1637	1640	
Earl of Nithsdale (1620)	Robert Maxwell, 1st Earl of Nithsdale	1620	1646	
Earl of Galloway (1623)	Alexander Stewart, 1st Earl of Galloway	1623	1649	
Earl of Seaforth (1623)	Colin Mackenzie, 1st Earl of Seaforth	1623	1633	Died
Earl of Seaforth (1623)	George Mackenzie, 2nd Earl of Seaforth	1633	1651	
Earl of Lauderdale (1624)	John Maitland, 1st Earl of Lauderdale	1624	1645	
Earl of Annandale (1625)	John Murray, 1st Earl of Annandale	1625	1640	
Earl of Tullibardine (1628)	Patrick Murray, 1st Earl of Tullibardine	1628	1644	
Earl of Carrick (1628)	John Stewart, 1st Earl of Carrick	1628	1646	
Earl of Atholl (1629)	John Murray, 1st Earl of Atholl	1629	1642	
Earl of Lothian (1631)	William Kerr, 1st Earl of Lothian	1631	1675	New creation
Earl of Airth (1633)	William Graham, 1st Earl of Airth	1633	1661	New creation
Earl of Lindsay (1633)	John Lindsay, 1st Earl of Lindsay	1633	1678	New creation
Earl of Loudoun (1633)	John Campbell, 1st Earl of Loudoun	1633	1662	New creation
Earl of Kinnoull (1633)	George Hay, 1st Earl of Kinnoull	1633	1642	New creation; died
Earl of Kinnoull (1633)	George Hay, 2nd Earl of Kinnoull	1634	1644	
Earl of Dumfries (1633)	William Crichton, 1st Earl of Dumfries	1633	1643	New creation
Earl of Queensberry (1633)	William Douglas, 1st Earl of Queensberry	1633	1640	New creation
Earl of Stirling (1633)	William Alexander, 1st Earl of Stirling	1633	1640	New creation; also created Viscount of Stirling in 1630
Earl of Elgin (1633)	Thomas Bruce, 1st Earl of Elgin	1633	1663	New creation
Earl of Southesk (1633)	David Carnegie, 1st Earl of Southesk	1633	1658	New creation
Earl of Traquair (1633)	John Stewart, 1st Earl of Traquair	1633	1659	New creation
Earl of Ancram (1633)	Robert Kerr, 1st Earl of Ancram	1633	1654	New creation
Earl of Wemyss (1633)	John Wemyss, 1st Earl of Wemyss	1633	1649	New creation
Earl of Dalhousie (1633)	William Ramsay, 1st Earl of Dalhousie	1633	1672	New creation
Earl of Findlater (1638)	James Ogilvy, 1st Earl of Findlater	1638	1653	New creation
Earl of Lanark (1639)	William Hamilton, 1st Earl of Lanark	1639	1651	New creation
Earl of Airlie (1639)	James Ogilvy, 1st Earl of Airlie	1639	1665	New creation
Earl of Carnwath (1639)	Robert Dalzell, 1st Earl of Carnwath	1639	1654	New creation
Viscount of Falkland (1620)	Henry Cary, 1st Viscount of Falkland	1620	1633	Died
Viscount of Falkland (1620)	Lucius Cary, 2nd Viscount of Falkland	1633	1643	
Viscount of Dunbar (1620)	Henry Constable, 1st Viscount of Dunbar	1620	1645	
Viscount of Stormont (1621)	David Murray, 1st Viscount of Stormont	1621	1631	Died
Viscount of Stormont (1621)	Mungo Murray, 2nd Viscount of Stormont	1631	1642	
Viscount of Ayr (1622)	William Crichton, 1st Viscount of Ayr	1622	1643	Created Earl of Dumfries, see above
Viscount of Dupplin (1627)	George Hay, 1st Viscount of Dupplin	1627	1634	Created Earl of Kinnoull, see above
Viscount of Melgum (1627)	John Gordon, 1st Viscount of Melgum	1627	1630	Died, title extinct
Viscount of Drumlanrig (1628)	William Douglas, 1st Viscount of Drumlanrig	1628	1640	Created Earl of Queensberry, see above
Viscount of Aboyne (1632)	George Gordon, 1st Viscount of Aboyne	1632	1636	On Lord Huntly's succession to the marquessate in 1636 the viscountcy passed according to the special remainder to his second son
Viscount of Aboyne (1632)	James Gordon, 2nd Viscount Aboyne	1636	1649	
Viscount of Belhaven (1633)	Robert Douglas, 1st Viscount of Belhaven	1633	1639	New creation; died, title extinct
Viscount of Kenmure (1633)	John Gordon, 1st Viscount of Kenmure	1633	1634	New creation; died
Viscount of Kenmure (1633)	John Gordon, 2nd Viscount of Kenmure	1634	1639	Died
Viscount of Kenmure (1633)	John Gordon, 3rd Viscount of Kenmure	1639	1643	
Lord Somerville (1430)	Hugh Somerville, 9th Lord Somerville	1618	1640	
Lord Forbes (1442)	Arthur Forbes, 9th Lord Forbes	1606	1641	
Lord Lindsay of the Byres (1445)	John Lindsay, 10th Lord Lindsay	1619	1678	Created Earl of Lindsay, see above
Lord Saltoun (1445)	Alexander Abernethy, 9th Lord Saltoun	1612	1668	
Lord Gray (1445)	Andrew Gray, 7th Lord Gray	1611	1663	
Lord Sinclair (1449)	John Sinclair, 9th Lord Sinclair	1615	1676	
Lord Borthwick (1452)	John Borthwick, 9th Lord Borthwick	1623	1675	
Lord Boyd (1454)	Robert Boyd, 8th Lord Boyd	1628	1640	
Lord Oliphant (1455)	Laurence Oliphant, 5th Lord Oliphant	1593	1631	Died
Lord Oliphant (1455)	Patrick Oliphant, 6th Lord Oliphant	1631	1680	
Lord Cathcart (1460)	Alan Cathcart, 6th Lord Cathcart	1628	1709	
Lord Lovat (1464)	Simon Fraser, 6th Lord Lovat	1577	1633	Died
Lord Lovat (1464)	Hugh Fraser, 7th Lord Lovat	1633	1646	
Lord Carlyle of Torthorwald (1473)	James Douglas, 6th Lord Carlyle	1605	1638	Surrendered the lordship
Lord Hay of Yester (1488)	John Hay, 8th Lord Hay of Yester	1609	1653	
Lord Sempill (1489)	Hugh Sempill, 5th Lord Sempill	1611	1639	Died
Lord Sempill (1489)	Francis Sempill, 6th Lord Sempill	1639	1644	
Lord Herries of Terregles (1490)	John Maxwell, 6th Lord Herries of Terregles	1604	1631	Died
Lord Herries of Terregles (1490)	John Maxwell, 7th Lord Herries of Terregles	1631	1677	
Lord Ogilvy of Airlie (1491)	James Ogilvy, 7th Lord Ogilvy of Airlie	1617	1665	Created Earl of Airlie, see above
Lord Ross (1499)	James Ross, 6th Lord Ross	1595	1633	Died
Lord Ross (1499)	James Ross, 7th Lord Ross	1633	1636	Died
Lord Ross (1499)	William Ross, 8th Lord Ross	1636	1640	
Lord Elphinstone (1509)	Alexander Elphinstone, 4th Lord Elphinstone	1602	1638	Died
Lord Elphinstone (1509)	Alexander Elphinstone, 5th Lord Elphinstone	1638	1648	
Lord Ochiltree (1543)	James Stewart, 4th Lord Ochiltree	1615	1658	
Lord Torphichen (1564)	John Sandilands, 4th Lord Torphichen	1622	1637	Died
Lord Torphichen (1564)	John Sandilands, 5th Lord Torphichen	1637	1649	
Lord Spynie (1590)	Alexander Lindsay, 2nd Lord Spynie	1607	1646	
Lord Lindores (1600)	Patrick Leslie, 2nd Lord Lindores	1608	1649	
Lord Campbell of Loudoun (1601)	John Campbell, 2nd Lord Campbell of Loudoun	1619	1662	Created Earl of Loudoun, see above
Lord Kinloss (1602)	Thomas Bruce, 3rd Lord Kinloss	1613	1663	Created Earl of Elgin, see above
Lord Colville of Culross (1604)	James Colville, 2nd Lord Colville of Culross	1629	1654	
Lord Balmerinoch (1606)	John Elphinstone, 2nd Lord Balmerino	1612	1649	
Lord Blantyre (1606)	William Stewart, 2nd Lord Blantyre	1617	1638	Died
Lord Blantyre (1606)	Walter Stewart, 3rd Lord Blantyre	1638	1641	
Lord Coupar (1607)	James Elphinstone, 1st Lord Coupar	1607	1669	
Lord Holyroodhouse (1607)	John Bothwell, 2nd Lord Holyroodhouse	1609	1638	Died, title dormant
Lord Balfour of Burleigh (1607)	Robert Balfour, 2nd Lord Balfour of Burleigh	1619	1663	
Lord Cranstoun (1609)	John Cranstoun, 2nd Lord Cranstoun	1627	1648	
Lord Maderty (1609)	John Drummond, 2nd Lord Madderty	1623	1647	
Lord Dingwall (1609)	Elizabeth Preston, 2nd Lady Dingwall	1628	1684	
Lord Cardross (1610)	David Erskine, 2nd Lord Cardross	1634	1671	Title previously held by the Earl of Buchan
Lord Ogilvy of Deskford (1616)	James Ogilvy, 2nd Lord Ogilvy of Deskford	1626	1653	Created Earl of Findlater, see above
Lord Carnegie (1616)	David Carnegie, 1st Lord Carnegie	1616	1658	Created Earl of Southesk, see above
Lord Melville of Monymaill (1616)	Robert Melville, 2nd Lord Melville	1621	1635	Died
Lord Melville of Monymaill (1616)	John Melville, 3rd Lord Melville	1635	1643	
Lord Ramsay of Dalhousie (1618)	William Ramsay, 2nd Lord Ramsay of Dalhousie	Bef 1629	1672	Created Earl of Dalhousie, see above
Lord Jedburgh (1622)	Andrew Ker, 1st Lord Jedburgh	1622	1633	Died
Lord Kintyre (1626)	James Campbell, 1st Lord Kintyre	1626	1645	
Lord Aston of Forfar (1627)	Walter Aston, 1st Lord Aston of Forfar	1627	1639	Died
Lord Aston of Forfar (1627)	Walter Aston, 2nd Lord Aston of Forfar	1639	1678	
Lord Barrett (1627)	Edward Barrett, 1st Lord Barrett of Newburgh	1627	1645	
Lord Fairfax of Cameron (1627)	Thomas Fairfax, 1st Lord Fairfax of Cameron	1627	1640	
Lord Napier (1627)	Archibald Napier, 1st Lord Napier	1627	1645	
Lord Reay (1628)	Donald Mackay, 1st Lord Reay	1628	1649	
Lord Cramond (1628)	Elizabeth Richardson, 1st Lady Cramond	1628	1651	
Lord Wemyss of Elcho (1628)	John Wemyss, 1st Lord Wemyss of Elcho	1628	1649	Created Earl of Wemyss, see above
Lord Lindsay of Balcarres (1633)	David Lindsay, 1st Lord Balcarres	1633	1641	New creation
Lord Livingston of Almond (1633)	James Livingston, 1st Lord Livingston of Almond	1633	1674	New creation
Lord Forbes of Pitsligo (1633)	Alexander Forbes, 1st Lord Forbes of Pitsligo	1633	1636	New creation; died
Lord Forbes of Pitsligo (1633)	Alexander Forbes, 2nd Lord Forbes of Pitsligo	1636	1690	
Lord Kirkcudbright (1633)	Robert Maclellan, 1st Lord Kirkcudbright	1633	1641	New creation
Lord Fraser (1633)	Andrew Fraser, 1st Lord Fraser	1633	1636	New creation; died
Lord Fraser (1633)	Andrew Fraser, 2nd Lord Fraser	1636	1674	
Lord Forrester (1633)	George Forrester, 1st Lord Forrester	1633	1654	New creation
Lord Innerwick (1638)	James Maxwell, 1st Lord Innerwick	1638	1650	New creation
Lord Rosehill and Inglismaldie (1639)	John Carnegie, 1st Lord Rosehill and Inglismaldie	1639	1667	New creation
Lord Ruthven of Ettrick (1639)	Patrick Ruthven, 1st Lord Ruthven of Ettrick	1639	1651	New creation

== Peerage of Ireland ==
Title	Holder	Date gained	Date lost	Notes
Earl of Kildare (1316)	George FitzGerald, 16th Earl of Kildare	1620	1660	
Earl of Ormond (1328)	Walter Butler, 11th Earl of Ormond	1614	1633	Died
Earl of Ormond (1328)	James Butler, 12th Earl of Ormonde	1633	1688	
Earl of Waterford (1446)	George Talbot, 9th Earl of Waterford	1617	1630	Died
Earl of Waterford (1446)	John Talbot, 10th Earl of Waterford	1630	1654	
Earl of Clanricarde (1543)	Richard Burke, 4th Earl of Clanricarde	1601	1635	Died
Earl of Clanricarde (1543)	Ulick Burke, 5th Earl of Clanricarde	1635	1657	
Earl of Thomond (1543)	Henry O'Brien, 5th Earl of Thomond	1624	1639	Died
Earl of Thomond (1543)	Barnabas O'Brien, 6th Earl of Thomond	1639	1657	
Earl of Castlehaven (1616)	Mervyn Tuchet, 2nd Earl of Castlehaven	1617	1630	Died
Earl of Castlehaven (1616)	James Tuchet, 3rd Earl of Castlehaven	1630	1684	
Earl of Cork (1620)	Richard Boyle, 1st Earl of Cork	1620	1643	
Earl of Antrim (1620)	Randal MacDonnell, 1st Earl of Antrim	1620	1636	Died
Earl of Antrim (1620)	Randal MacDonnell, 2nd Earl of Antrim	1636	1682	
Earl of Westmeath (1621)	Richard Nugent, 1st Earl of Westmeath	1621	1642	
Earl of Roscommon (1622)	James Dillon, 1st Earl of Roscommon	1622	1642	
Earl of Londonderry (1622)	Thomas Ridgeway, 1st Earl of Londonderry	1622	1631	Died
Earl of Londonderry (1622)	Robert Ridgeway, 2nd Earl of Londonderry	1631	1641	
Earl of Meath (1627)	William Brabazon, 1st Earl of Meath	1627	1651	
Earl of Barrymore (1628)	David Barry, 1st Earl of Barrymore	1628	1642	
Earl of Carbery (1628)	John Vaughan, 1st Earl of Carbery	1628	1634	Died
Earl of Carbery (1628)	Richard Vaughan, 2nd Earl of Carbery	1634	1687	
Earl of Fingall (1628)	Luke Plunkett, 1st Earl of Fingall	1628	1637	Died
Earl of Fingall (1628)	Christopher Plunkett, 2nd Earl of Fingall	1637	1649	
Earl of Downe (1628)	William Pope, 1st Earl of Downe	1628	1640	
Earl of Desmond (1628)	George Feilding, 1st Earl of Desmond	1628	1665	
Viscount Gormanston (1478)	Jenico Preston, 5th Viscount Gormanston	1599	1630	Died
Viscount Gormanston (1478)	Nicholas Preston, 6th Viscount Gormanston	1630	1643	
Viscount Mountgarret (1550)	Richard Butler, 3rd Viscount Mountgarret	1602	1651	
Viscount Powerscourt (1618)	Richard Wingfield, 1st Viscount Powerscourt	1618	1634	Died, title extinct
Viscount Grandison (1621)	Oliver St John, 1st Viscount Grandison	1621	1630	Died
Viscount Grandison (1621)	William Villiers, 2nd Viscount Grandison	1630	1643	
Viscount Wilmot (1621)	Charles Wilmot, 1st Viscount Wilmot	1621	1644	
Viscount Valentia (1621)	Henry Power, 1st Viscount Valentia	1621	1642	
Viscount Moore (1621)	Charles Moore, 2nd Viscount Moore	1627	1643	
Viscount Dillon (1622)	Theobald Dillon, 3rd Viscount Dillon	1629	1630	Died
Viscount Dillon (1622)	Thomas Dillon, 4th Viscount Dillon	1630	1672	
Viscount Loftus (1622)	Adam Loftus, 1st Viscount Loftus	1622	1643	
Viscount Beaumont of Swords (1622)	Sapcote Beaumont, 2nd Viscount Beaumont of Swords	1625	1658	
Viscount Netterville (1622)	Nicholas Netterville, 1st Viscount Netterville	1622	1654	
Viscount Montgomery (1622)	Hugh Montgomery, 1st Viscount Montgomery	1622	1636	Died
Viscount Montgomery (1622)	Hugh Montgomery, 2nd Viscount Montgomery	1636	1642	
Viscount Claneboye (1622)	James Hamilton, 1st Viscount Claneboye	1622	1644	
Viscount Magennis (1623)	Hugh Magennis, 2nd Viscount Magennis	1629	1639	Died
Viscount Magennis (1623)	Arthur Magennis, 3rd Viscount Magennis	1639	1683	
Viscount Lecale (1624)	Thomas Cromwell, 1st Viscount Lecale	1624	1653	
Viscount Chichester (1625)	Edward Chichester, 1st Viscount Chichester	1625	1648	
Viscount Kilmorey (1625)	Robert Needham, 1st Viscount Kilmorey	1625	1631	Died
Viscount Kilmorey (1625)	Robert Needham, 2nd Viscount Kilmorey	1631	1653	
Viscount Somerset (1626)	Thomas Somerset, 1st Viscount Somerset	1626	1649	
Viscount Carlingford (1627)	Barnham Swift, 1st Viscount Carlingford	1627	1634	Died, title extinct
Viscount Baltinglass (1627)	Thomas Roper, 1st Viscount Baltinglass	1627	1637	Died
Viscount Baltinglass (1627)	Thomas Roper, 2nd Viscount Baltinglass	1637	1670	
Viscount Castleton (1627)	Nicholas Saunderson, 1st Viscount Castleton	1627	1630	Died
Viscount Castleton (1627)	Nicholas Saunderson, 2nd Viscount Castleton	1630	1640	
Viscount Killultagh (1627)	Edward Conway, 1st Viscount Killultagh	1627	1631	Died
Viscount Killultagh (1627)	Edward Conway, 2nd Viscount Killultagh	1631	1655	
Viscount Mayo (1627)	Miles Bourke, 2nd Viscount Mayo	1629	1649	
Viscount Sarsfield (1627)	Dominick Sarsfield, 1st Viscount Sarsfield	1627	1636	Died
Viscount Sarsfield (1627)	William Sarsfield, 2nd Viscount Sarsfield	1636	1648	
Viscount Boyle of Kinalmeaky (1628)	Lewis Boyle, 1st Viscount Boyle of Kinalmeaky	1628	1642	
Viscount Chaworth (1628)	George Chaworth, 1st Viscount Chaworth	1628	1639	Died
Viscount Chaworth (1628)	John Chaworth, 2nd Viscount Chaworth	1639	1644	
Viscount Savile (1628)	Thomas Savile, 1st Viscount Savile	1628	1659	
Viscount Cholmondeley (1628)	Robert Cholmondeley, 1st Viscount Cholmondeley	1628	1659	
Viscount Lumley (1628)	Richard Lumley, 1st Viscount Lumley	1628	1663	
Viscount Taaffe (1628)	John Taaffe, 1st Viscount Taaffe	1628	1642	
Viscount Molyneux (1628)	Richard Molyneux, 1st Viscount Molyneux	1628	1636	Died
Viscount Molyneux (1628)	Richard Molyneux, 2nd Viscount Molyneux	1636	1654	
Viscount Monson (1628)	William Monson, 1st Viscount Monson	1628	1660	
Viscount Muskerry (1628)	Charles MacCarthy, 1st Viscount Muskerry	1628	1640	
Viscount Strangford (1628)	Thomas Smythe, 1st Viscount Strangford	1628	1635	Died
Viscount Strangford (1628)	Philip Smythe, 2nd Viscount Strangford	1635	1708	
Viscount Scudamore (1628)	John Scudamore, 1st Viscount Scudamore	1628	1671	
Viscount Wenman (1628)	Richard Wenman, 1st Viscount Wenman	1628	1640	
Viscount Ranelagh (1628)	Roger Jones, 1st Viscount Ranelagh	1628	1643	
Viscount Bourke of Clanmories (1629)	John Bourke, 1st Viscount Bourke	1629	1635	
Viscount Bourke of Clanmories (1629)	Thomas Bourke, 2nd Viscount Bourke	1635	1650	
Viscount FitzWilliam (1629)	Thomas FitzWilliam, 1st Viscount FitzWilliam	1629	1650	
Viscount Fairfax of Emley (1629)	Thomas Fairfax, 1st Viscount Fairfax of Emley	1629	1636	Died
Viscount Fairfax of Emley (1629)	Thomas Fairfax, 2nd Viscount Fairfax of Emley	1636	1641	
Viscount Ikerrin (1629)	Pierce Butler, 1st Viscount Ikerrin	1629	1674	
Viscount Clanmalier (1631)	Terence O'Dempsey, 1st Viscount Clanmalier	1631	1638	New creation; died
Viscount Clanmalier (1631)	Lewis O'Dempsey, 2nd Viscount Clanmalier	1638	1683	
Baron Athenry (1172)	Richard III de Bermingham	1612	1645	
Baron Kingsale (1223)	Gerald de Courcy, 19th Baron Kingsale	1628	1642	
Baron Kerry (1223)	Thomas Fitzmaurice, 18th Baron Kerry	1600	1630	Died
Baron Kerry (1223)	Patrick Fitzmaurice, 19th Baron Kerry	1630	1661	
Baron Slane (1370)	William Fleming, 14th Baron Slane	1629	1641	
Baron Howth (1425)	Nicholas St Lawrence, 11th Baron Howth	1619	1643	
Baron Trimlestown (1461)	Robert Barnewall, 7th Baron Trimlestown	1598	1639	Died
Baron Trimlestown (1461)	Matthias Barnewall, 8th Baron Trimlestown	1539	1667	
Baron Dunsany (1462)	Patrick Plunkett, 9th Baron of Dunsany	1603	1668	
Baron Power (1535)	John Power, 5th Baron Power	1607	1661	
Baron Dunboyne (1541)	Edmond Butler, 3rd/13th Baron Dunboyne	1624	1640	
Baron Louth (1541)	Oliver Plunkett, 6th Baron Louth	1629	1679	
Baron Upper Ossory (1541)	Barnaby Fitzpatrick, 5th Baron Upper Ossory	1627	1638	Died
Baron Upper Ossory (1541)	Barnaby Fitzpatrick, 6th Baron Upper Ossory	1638	1666	
Baron Inchiquin (1543)	Murrough O'Brien, 6th Baron Inchiquin	1624	1674	
Baron Bourke of Castleconnell (1580)	Edmund Bourke, 5th Baron Bourke of Connell	1599	1635	Died
Baron Bourke of Castleconnell (1580)	William Bourke, 6th Baron Bourke of Connell	1635	1665	
Baron Cahir (1583)	Thomas Butler, 3rd Baron Cahir	1627	1648	
Baron Hamilton (1617)	James Hamilton, 2nd Baron Hamilton	1617	1633	Died
Baron Hamilton (1617)	Claud Hamilton, 2nd Baron Hamilton of Strabane	1633	1638	Died
Baron Hamilton (1617)	James Hamilton, 3rd Baron Hamilton of Strabane	1638	1655	
Baron Bourke of Brittas (1618)	Theobald Bourke, 1st Baron Bourke of Brittas	1618	1654	
Baron Lambart (1618)	Charles Lambart, 2nd Baron Lambart	1618	1660	
Baron Mountjoy (1618)	Mountjoy Blount, 1st Baron Mountjoy	1618	1665	
Baron Balfour (1619)	James Balfour, 1st Baron Balfour of Glenawley	1619	1634	Died
Baron Balfour (1619)	James Balfour, 2nd Baron Balfour of Glenawley	1634	1635	Died
Baron Balfour (1619)	Alexander Balfour, 3rd Baron Balfour of Glenawley	1635	1636	Died, title extinct
Baron Castle Stewart (1619)	Andrew Stewart, 2nd Baron Castle Stewart	1629	1639	Died
Baron Castle Stewart (1619)	Andrew Stewart, 3rd Baron Castle Stewart	1639	1650	
Baron Folliot (1620)	Thomas Folliott, 2nd Baron Folliott	1622	1697	
Baron Maynard (1620)	William Maynard, 1st Baron Maynard	1620	1640	
Baron Gorges of Dundalk (1620)	Edward Gorges, 1st Baron Gorges of Dundalk	1620	1650	
Baron Offaly (1620)	Lettice Digby, 1st Baroness Offaly	1620	1658	
Baron Digby (1620)	Robert Digby, 1st Baron Digby	1620	1642	
Baron Hervey (1620)	William Hervey, 1st Baron Hervey	1620	1642	
Baron Fitzwilliam (1620)	William Fitzwilliam, 1st Baron Fitzwilliam	1620	1644	
Baron Caulfeild (1620)	William Caulfeild, 2nd Baron Caulfeild	1627	1640	
Baron Aungier (1621)	Francis Aungier, 1st Baron Aungier of Longford	1621	1632	Died
Baron Aungier (1621)	Gerald Aungier, 2nd Baron Aungier of Longford	1632	1655	
Baron Blayney (1621)	Henry Blayney, 2nd Baron Blayney	1629	1646	
Baron Dockwra (1621)	Henry Dockwra, 1st Baron Dockwra	1621	1631	Died
Baron Dockwra (1621)	Theodore Dockwra, 2nd Baron Dockwra	1631	1647	
Baron Esmonde (1622)	Laurence Esmonde, 1st Baron Esmonde	1622	1646	
Baron Glean-O'Mallun (1622)	Dermot O'Mallun, 1st Baron Glean-O'Mallun	1622	1639	Died, title extinct
Baron Brereton (1624)	William Brereton, 1st Baron Brereton	1624	1631	Died
Baron Brereton (1624)	William Brereton, 2nd Baron Brereton	1631	1664	
Baron Herbert of Castle Island (1624)	Edward Herbert, 1st Baron Herbert of Castle Island	1624	1648	
Baron Baltimore (1625)	George Calvert, 1st Baron Baltimore	1625	1632	Died
Baron Baltimore (1625)	Cecilius Calvert, 2nd Baron Baltimore	1632	1675	
Baron Coleraine (1625)	Hugh Hare, 1st Baron Coleraine	1625	1667	
Baron Sherard (1627)	William Sherard, 1st Baron Sherard	1627	1640	
Baron Boyle of Broghill (1628)	Roger Boyle, 1st Baron Boyle of Broghill	1628	1679	
Baron Maguire (1628)	Bryan Maguire, 1st Baron Maguire	1628	1633	Died
Baron Maguire (1628)	Connor Maguire, 2nd Baron Maguire	1633	1645	
Baron Mountnorris (1629)	Francis Annesley, 1st Baron Mountnorris	1629	1660	

Preceded by List of peers 1620–1629	Lists of peers by decade 1630–1639	Succeeded by List of peers 1640–1649
