= Lord High Constable =

Lord High Constable may refer to:

- Lord High Constable of England, a Great Officer of State, now called out of abeyance only for coronations
- Lord High Constable of Scotland, a hereditary, now ceremonial, office of Scotland
- Lord High Constable of Ireland, office abolished after the creation of the Irish Free State in 1922
- Lord High Constable of Sweden, a prominent and influential office in Sweden from the 13th century until 1676
- Amirspasalar, or Lord High Constable of Georgia

== See also ==
- Lord Constable, a title in the Peerage of Scotland
- Head Constable,
- Chief Constable,
- Constable, a person holding a particular office, most commonly in law enforcement
