= William Graham, 8th Earl of Menteith =

Scottish nobleman

William Graham, 8th Earl of Menteith, 2nd Earl of Airth (c. 1634 – 1694), was a Scottish nobleman. He was active in the suppression of the Covenanters, but struggled with the burden of debts on his estates. On his death in 1694 his titles became extinct.

== Biography ==
William Graham was the son of John Graham, master of Menteith, and Lady Mary Keith. Upon the death of his grandfather, William Graham, 7th Earl of Menteith, in 1661, William Graham became 8th Earl of Menteith and 2nd Earl of Airth. Because most of his lands were in the hands of creditors due to the actions of his grandfather, he did not wish to inherit the earldom, and for several years he lived in London, seeking from Charles II the money that was allegedly owed to his grandfather by Charles I. For his efforts, he gained the sum of 500 pounds, but this barely covered the interest on the mortgages held by the creditors.

== Bridge of Aberfoyle ==
He took an active part in opposing the Covenanters throughout his earldom. In 1671, shortly after gaining the power to take such actions against criminals and debtors within his earldom, he obtained an arrest warrant for John Graham of Duchray for disobeying the orders of the king by failing to repay a debt. Learning that Thomas Graham of Duchray (the son of John Graham of Duchray) was to attend a baptism, the Earl of Airth took advantage of this family gathering to execute his warrant. And so on 13 February 1671, the Earl and Alexander Muschet, along with a well armed party, made their way to the bridge to arrest John Graham of Duchray who was known to be sympathetic to the Covenanters, and who likely politically opposed the 7th Earl. John Graham of Duchray held papers of protection from the king, and said "What dar ye do? This is all your masters", but the papers held protection from removal from certain lands, and not from a civil debt.

The son of Thomas Graham of Duchray, ripe for the christening at the kirk in Aberfoyle in 1671, was placed upon the ground and the Duchray party prepared their swords, guns, and muskets, avowing that half of the Earl's party would be killed and the other half would drown. It is said that the Earl was narrowly missed by several bullets, and one of the Earl's party, a Robert MacFarlane, lost two of his fingers. John Graham of Duchray was placed in the Edinburgh Tolbooth.

== The end of Menteith and Airth ==
His creditors compelled him to take the earldom, and in 1670, they enforced their claims. In about 1679, the Earl of Airth entered into an agreement with the Marquess of Montrose, whereby the Earldom of Menteith was to be granted to him provided that he should marry Helen or Elanor Graham, the Earl's cousins.

The Marquess of Montrose chose not to marry one of the Earl's cousins, and instead gained the right to the earldom through Charles II, and this transfer all but extinguished the Earldom of Menteith. He divorced his wife Anna in 1685, who accused him of bigamy and adultery. Although he had been dispossessed of the majority of rights to earldom over Menteith, William Graham continued as the Earl of Airth until his death in 1694, and he died without leaving any issue.

The title of Earl of Menteith was later assumed in 1744, by a William Graham, who was the great-grandson of Elizabeth Graham, the Earl's sister.

Peerage of Scotland
Preceded by William Graham	Earl of Menteith; Earl of Airth; 1661–1694	Extinct
