= Lord Constable =

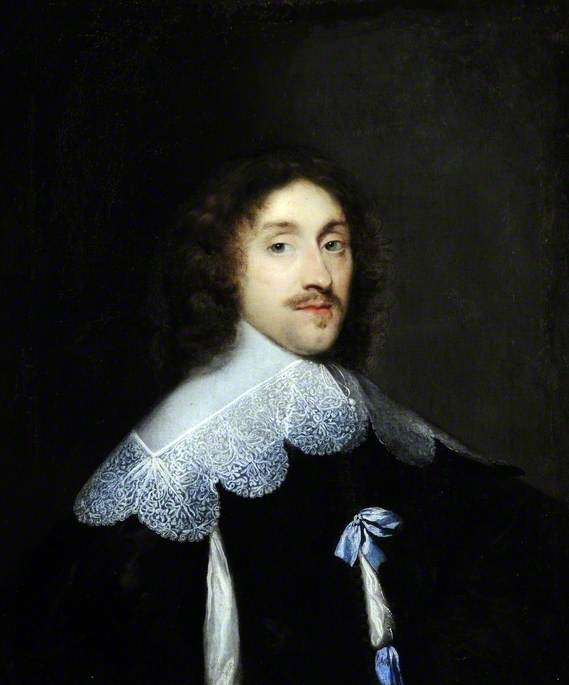
John Constable, 2nd Lord Constable

Lord Constable is a title that was created in the Peerage of Scotland for Sir Henry Constable. He was granted the lordship, together with the viscountcy of Dunbar in 1620, which remained in the possession of the Viscounts of Dunbar until 1718. However, upon the passing of the 4th Viscount of Dunbar, both titles ceased to exist.

== Lords Constable (1620) ==
- Henry Constable, 1st Lord Constable (c. 1588 – 1645)
- John Constable, 2nd Lord Constable (1615 – c. 1668)
- Robert Constable, 3rd Lord Constable (1651–1714)
- William Constable, 4th Lord Constable (1654–1718)
