= Viscount of Dunbar =

- Arms of Constable: Or, three bars azure.
- Creation date: 14 November 1620
- Created by: James VI and I
- Peerage: Peerage of Scotland
- First holder: Henry Constable, 1st Viscount of Dunbar
- Last holder: William Constable, 4th Viscount of Dunbar
- Subsidiary titles: Lord Constable
- Status: Dormant
- Extinction date: 15 August 1718
- Motto: SANS MAUVAIS DÉSIR (Without the wrong desire)

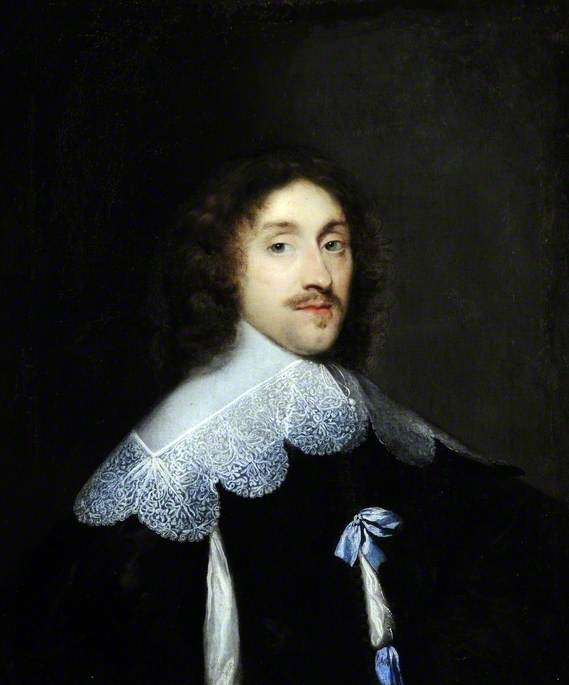
John Constable, 2nd Viscount of Dunbar

Viscount of Dunbar was a title in the Peerage of Scotland created on 14 November 1620, along with the title Lord Constable, for Sir Henry Constable. The titles have been dormant since the death of the 4th Viscount in 1718.

== Viscounts of Dunbar (1620) ==
- Henry Constable, 1st Viscount of Dunbar (c. 1588 – 1645)
- John Constable, 2nd Viscount of Dunbar (1615 – c. 1668)
- Robert Constable, 3rd Viscount of Dunbar (1651–1714)
- William Constable, 4th Viscount of Dunbar (1654–1718)

== See also ==
- Earl of Dunbar
