= Edward Barrett, 1st Lord Barrett of Newburgh =

English politician

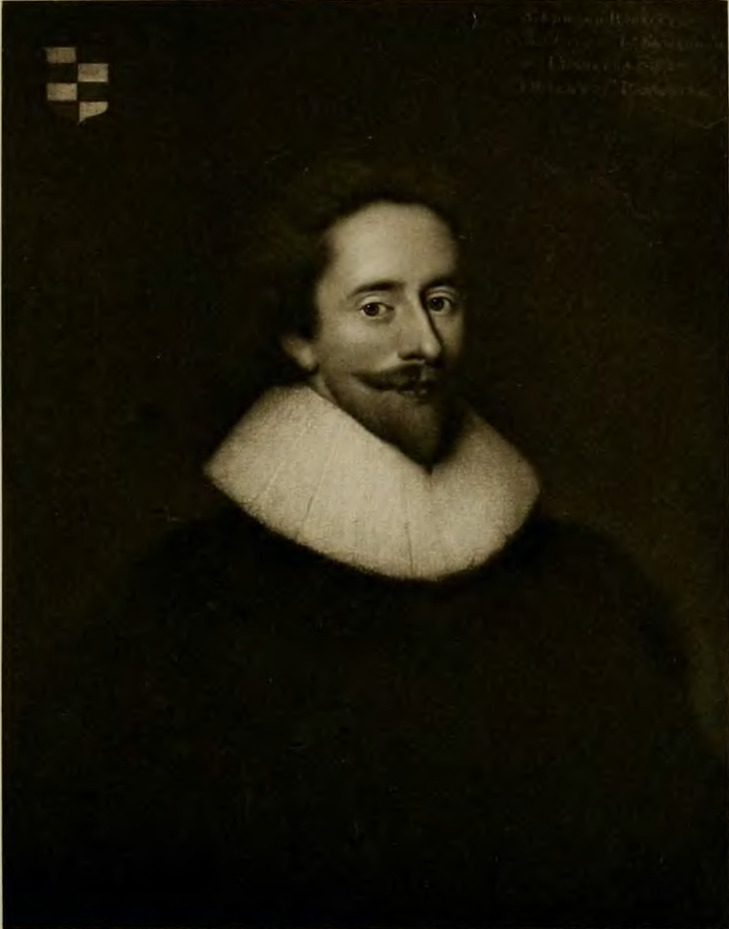
- portrait by Cornelius Janssen
- Born: 21 June 1581
- Died: December 1644 (aged 62–63)
- Spouse(s): Jane Cary, Catherine Fenn
- Parent(s): Charles Barrett; Christian Mildmay
- Position held: Member of the 1614 Parliament, Member of the 1621-22 Parliament

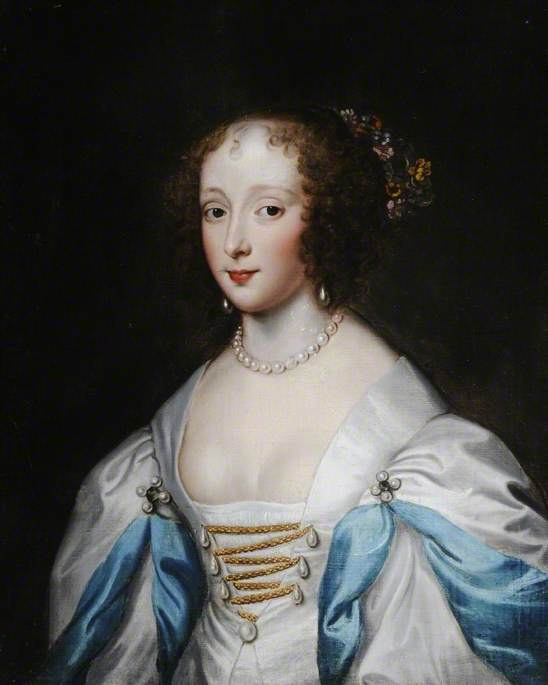
Jane Cary, Edward Barrett's first wife, by Cornelius Johnson

Sir Edward Barrett, 1st Lord Barrett of Newburgh, PC, Bt, (21 June 1581 – buried 2 January 1645) was an English politician.

== Life ==
Barrett was the son of Charles Barrett of Belhouse, Essex and his wife Christian Mildmay (a daughter of Sir Walter Mildmay). He matriculated at Queen's College, Oxford on 17 March 1597 and entered Lincoln's Inn in 1600. He was knighted on 17 April 1608.

In 1614, Barrett was elected Member of Parliament for Whitchurch. He was elected MP for Newport in 1621. In 1625, he was Ambassador to France.

Barret was created Lord Barrett of Newburgh in Scotland on 17 October 1627 and was made a baronet a year later (a unique occurrence of someone being made a baronet after being made peer). In 1628, he was invested as member of the Privy Council. He was Chancellor of the Exchequer from 1628 to 1629, and Chancellor of the Duchy of Lancaster from 1629 to 1644. He was a Lord of the Treasury from 1641 to 1643.

In August 1637 he wrote to the Earl of Middlesex that Henrietta Maria was unwell at Oatlands and was drinking asses milk, thought to be a remedy for consumption.

He wrote to Middlesex about the Earl of Arundel who had fallen from his horse at Tart Hall. The Countess of Arundel was "pained by his obstinate, as some think ridiculous, resolution to go to Madagascar.

== Death ==
Barrett died at the age of 63 and was buried at Aveley on 2 January 1645.

== Family ==
Barrett married Jane Cary (d. 1633), daughter of Sir Edward Cary of Aldenham, Master of the Jewel House. He married secondly, Catherine Fenn, daughter of Hugh Fenn of Wotton-under-Edge, and widow of Hugh Perry alias Hunter, a London mercer.

Barrett was married twice but had no heirs, so that upon his death in 1645, his titles became extinct. He left his papers to Edward Perry, his widow's grandson.

Political offices
Preceded by The Earl of Portland	Chancellor of the Exchequer of England; 1628–1629	Succeeded by The Lord Cottington
Preceded by Sir Humphrey May	Chancellor of the Duchy of Lancaster; 1629–1644	Succeeded by Lord Seymour
Peerage of Scotland
New creation	Lord Barrett of Newburgh; 1627–1645	Extinct
Baronetage of Nova Scotia
New creation	Baronet (of Newburgh); 1628–1645	Extinct
