= Henry Constable, 1st Viscount of Dunbar =

English recusant Catholic from Yorkshire given a Scottish peerage

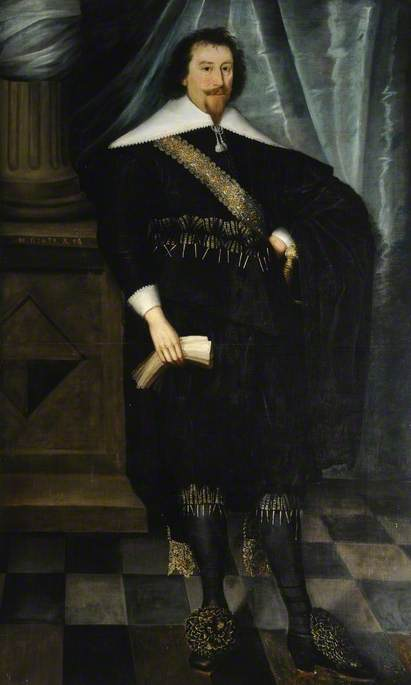
Sir Henry Constable, 1st Viscount of Dunbar, 1634 portrait

Henry Constable, 1st Viscount of Dunbar (1588–1645) was an English recusant Catholic from Yorkshire given a Scottish peerage by James I and VI. He died during the English Civil War, fighting as a Royalist colonel at Scarborough Castle. He was often known as Lord Dunbar.

== Life ==
He was the son of Sir Henry Constable of Burton and Halsham in the East Riding of Yorkshire, sheriff of the county in 1556 and Member of Parliament for Hedon 1585–8 and 1603–8, by Margaret, daughter of Sir William Dormer of Wing, Buckinghamshire. His mother was reputed an obstinate recusant, not to be "reformed by any persuasion, or yet by coercion" according to John Strype.

On the death of his father in 1608, Constable succeeded to the family estates. He was knighted at the Tower of London on 14 March 1615, and created Lord Constable and Viscount Dunbar in the Peerage of Scotland by patent dated at Newmark 14 November 1620. About the same time he was appointed deputy-justice in eyre for Galtres Forest. This royal forest was once about 20 miles (32 km) wide from Aldborough in the north to York in the south. The position would not at the time have been a sinecure, as the chief justice role had become by Tudor times. Disafforestation proceeded to mid-century, when essentially all the timber had been cut. Sharpe concludes that Galtres, like Feckenham and Selwood, was probably targeted at the beginning of the reign of Charles I to finance military expenditure.

Lord Dunbar was a heavy gambler. A record from 1621 shows that Francis Manners, 6th Earl of Rutland was one of his gambling partners.

=== Target recusant ===
Emanuel Scrope, Baron Scrope and Lord Dunbar were Yorkshire allies of George Villiers, 1st Duke of Buckingham. Dunbar tried to use this position to lessen the recusant subsidy he was to pay under the 1623 Act through the commissioner Sir William Alford from Holderness; but failed when the Privy Council reversed Alford's ruling.

Scrope, Dunbar and Rutland were on the list of the Duke's recusant placemen brought up in the House of Commons by Thomas Posthumous Hoby in 1626. Sir John Eliot took up Hoby's complaint. In coordination with the parliamentary attacks, a petition to the King Charles I gave details of an investigative journey of the Council of the North in 1625 to Scarborough, concerned with Spanish ships off the coast, involving those three and other recusants. The petition also harked back to an old grudge of Hoby against the Eure family, by naming William, Lord Eure.

Lord Dunbar was charged with recusancy to the extent of not frequenting church in 1629, but obtained a stay of process and a letter of immunity from the King.

=== Period of the Wars of the Three Kingdoms and death ===
In 1639 Lord Dunbar assisted in the financing of the Bishops' Wars. In July 1641 the Council of the North was abolished by the Long Parliament. Dunbar came under suspicion in Parliament in 1642, Henry Belasyse and Sir Hugh Cholmeley, 1st Baronet alleging that he was stockpiling arms, and he was ordered to appear before the House of Commons with his son John.

After the outbreak of war, Dunbar in 1644 took a colonel's commission in the forces of the Marquess of Newcastle-upon-Tyne. He fought at the Battle of Marston Moor in the cavalry regiment of Sir Edward Widdrington, 1st Baronet. After that defeat, he sheltered at Scarborough with Sir Hugh Cholmeley, where his two younger sons joined him. He was killed on 28 June 1645 in the fighting at Scarborough Castle, where his sons were wounded. The family seat Burton Constable Hall was sacked by Parliamentary forces.

== Family ==
Constable married Mary, second daughter of Sir John Tufton of Hothfield, Kent. The couple had three sons and three daughters:

- John (1615–1668), succeeded in 1645 as the 2nd Viscount. He married Mary, daughter of Thomas Brudenell, 1st Earl of Cardigan.
- Matthew
- William
- Mary, married Robert Brudenell, 2nd Earl of Cardigan.
- Catherine, married William Middleton of Stockeld.
- Margaret
