= Earl of Airth =

Extinct title in the Peerage of Scotland

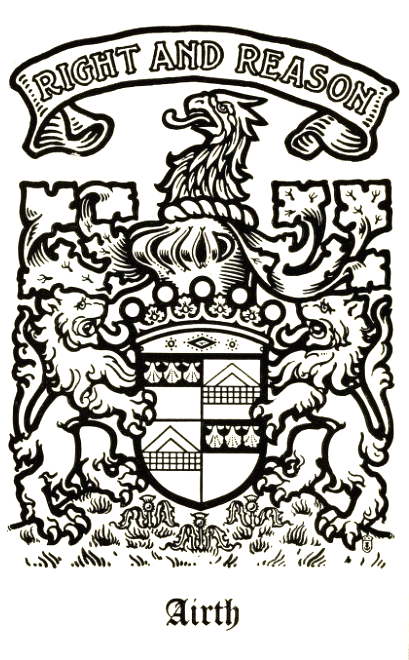
Coat of arms of the Earls of Airth (Sir James Balfour, The Scots Peerage (1904), Volume 1)

Earl of Airth was a title in the Peerage of Scotland, created on 21 January 1633 by Charles I, for William Graham, 7th Earl of Menteith. It became extinct on the death of his grandson in 1694.

== Overview ==
Owing to the uncanonicity of the marriage of Robert II to Elizabeth Mure, and the 1373 Act which only sidestepped this question for heirs male of Robert II's sons, William Graham's ancestors potentially had a better claim to the Scottish throne than Mary, Queen of Scots. Graham thus had a potentially better claim to the throne than Mary's descendant, Charles I, as Graham's claim descends from Robert II's second - undoubted - marriage. Graham had successfully petitioned for the return of the title of Earl of Strathearn which the first Graham Earl of Mentieth had held. Before he was invested, however, Graham boasted that his blood was "bluer than the King's". He was dismissed from his positions and instead of receiving the Earldom of Strathearn, he was given the insultingly minor title of Earl of Airth.

== Earls of Airth (1633) ==
- William Graham, 1st Earl of Airth (c. 1591 – 1661)
- William Graham, 2nd Earl of Airth (c. 1634 – 1694)

== 19th century claimant ==
On the death of the 2nd Earl of Airth the earldom became dormant. In 1834 Capt Robert Barclay Allardice of Ury and Allardice petitioned the King to be recognised as Earl of Airth as a descendant of William Graham, 1st Earl of Airth, his great-great-great-grandfather, basing his claim on the fact that the Letters Patent of 1633 specified descent to 'heirs general', rather than limiting it to 'heirs male'. The petition was referred to the House of Lords. No decision was forthcoming and in 1840 Capt Barclay Allardice petitioned Queen Victoria for him to be recognised as Earl of Strathearn, Menteith and Airth. Capt Barclay Allardice died in 1854 and his elder daughter, Mary Barclay Allardice, renewed the claim in 1870. The Committee for Privileges heard evidence in support of the opposing claims in 1870 and 1871, but came to no decision, and the three Earldoms remained dormant. On 29 April 2011, Queen Elizabeth II conferred the title of Earl of Strathearn on Prince William of Wales. As a result, on marriage his wife Catherine became Countess of Strathearn. He generally uses this title in Scotland.
