= James Ogilvy, 1st Earl of Findlater =

Scottish nobleman (died 1652)

Arms of Ogilvy of Findlater

James Ogilvy, 1st Earl of Findlater (c.1592–1652), known as Lord Ogilvy of Deskford until 1638, was a Scottish nobleman and Royalist supporter. His title was named after Findlater Castle, the ancient seat of the Ogilvies of Deskford and Findlater, a branch of Clan Ogilvy. Despite being a Royalist, he was described as "[not] prepared to go to war for [the King]". Instead Lord Findlater attempted to keep the peace in the north-east of Scotland, peacemaking between Huntly's supporters and the Covenanters.

He was the son of Walter Ogilvy, 1st Lord Ogilvy of Deskford and Lady Mary Douglas. He married Lady Elizabeth Leslie, daughter of Andrew Leslie, 5th Earl of Rothes. He had two daughters, the eldest of whom was married to Sir Patrick Ogilvy who, upon Lord Findlater's death in 1652, succeeded as the 2nd Earl of Findlater.

== See also ==
- Earl of Findlater
