= Ludovic Lindsay, 16th Earl of Crawford =

Scottish landowner and Royalist (1600–1652)

Ludovic Lindsay, 16th Earl of Crawford (1600 – 1652), was a Scottish landowner and Royalist. He was the son of Henry Lindsay, 13th Earl of Crawford and Helen Chisholm.

In 1633-1634 Lindsay served the Polish king and commanded a unit composed partially of Scotsmen during the Muscovite campaigns. In 1636-1638 he led the same unit in service of Felipe IV against the French in Flanders. Lindsay took part in the strange plot of 1641 called The Incident. Having joined King Charles I at Nottingham in 1642, he fought at the Battle of Edgehill, at the Battle of Newbury and elsewhere during the English Civil War; in 1644, just after the Battle of Marston Moor, the Scots Parliament declared he had forfeited his earldom, and, following the lines laid down when this was regranted in 1642, it was given to John Lindsay, 1st Earl of Lindsay. Ludovic was taken prisoner at Newcastle-on-Tyne in 1644, following the seven-month Siege of Newcastle, and was condemned to death, but the sentence was not carried out, and in 1645 he was released by Montrose, under whom he served until the surrender of the King at Newark-on-Trent. Later he was in Ireland and in Spain and he died, probably in France, in 1652.

At the death of Ludovic Lindsay, the title Earl of Crawford was passed, despite senior heirs, to his cousin, John Lindsay, who had already been created Earl of Lindsay. The earldoms of Crawford and Lindsay continued to be united until George Lindsay-Crawford, 22nd Earl of Crawford, (6th Earl of Lindsay) died unmarried in January 1808.

Peerage of Scotland
| Preceded by Alexander Lindsay | Earl of Crawford; 1639–1652 | Succeeded by John Lindsay |
