= William Graham, 7th Earl of Menteith =

Scottish nobleman

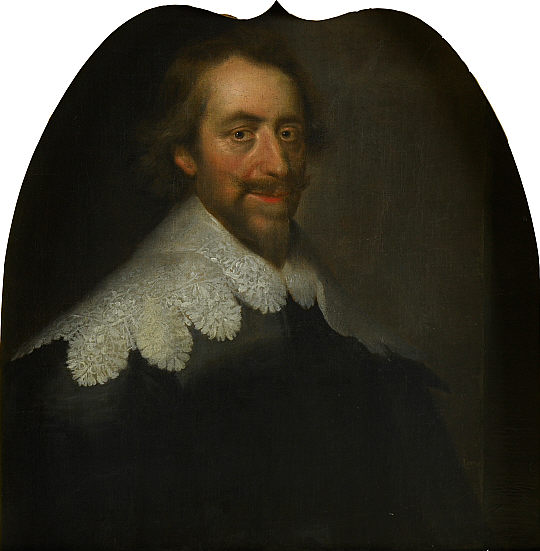
William Graham, 7th Earl of Menteith, 1st Earl of Airth, painted in 1637 by George Jamesone

William Graham, 7th Earl of Menteith, 1st Earl of Airth (c. 1591–1661), was a 17th-century Scottish nobleman. A supporter of King Charles I, he held offices including Lord President of the Court of Session and was a Privy Counsellor. Although he fell from favour, he continued to support the Royal cause during the Wars of the Three Kingdoms, when his estates were damaged by the troops of Oliver Cromwell. He married Agnes, daughter of Patrick, Lord Gray, and had a son John Graham, Lord of Kinpont, who had a son William Graham, 8th Earl of Menteith who prior to his death was styled William Graham, Lord of Kinpont.

== Biography ==
=== Early life ===
Born in 1591 or 1592, William Graham was still in his minority in the early part of 1610 when a royal dispensation was granted, and on 7 August that year, he reached the age of majority and was served heir to his father in the earldom of Menteith, the lands of Kilbride, and others. He devoted much of his early life to consolidating and adding to his estates.

=== Offices held ===
In 1621, Graham had a Commission of Justiciary over the criminal activity in his lands, and in that same year he first sat in Parliament. Appointed a member of the Privy Council of Scotland in 1626, he was Lord President of the Court of Session from 1628, an office he held in conjunction with that of Lord Justice General. He was held in great favour by Charles I, who appointed him a member of the English privy council.

== Extension of authority ==
Having attained a position of influence, William Graham initiated a suit to try and reclaim the earldom of Strathearn, comprising the lands of Strathearn which encompassed all of Menteith and other areas. This earldom had been lost by his ancestor Malise Graham, 1st Earl of Menteith, in 1427. He proceeded on the idea that the earldom of Strathearn only followed along male lines of descent, and therefore reverted to him, and he was not hindered in his efforts. He was created Earl of Strathearn in 1631, and took action to secure his authority over all of Strathearn.

=== Opposition ===
Graham met with some opposition which dealt with his claims to the Earldom of Menteith and his bloodline. William Graham's opponents, who possessed some of the lands of Strathearn, showed great alarm at the fact that William Graham was to be the earl of their lands, and took it upon themselves to tell of William Graham's boasting of a bloodline more royal than the King, Charles I. It is said that in front of witnesses he boasted that he had the reddest blood in Scotland and that the King was obliged to him for his crown, a charge which Earl William denied. The argument involving the royal bloodline involves an inheritance or relation to David Stewart, Earl of Strathearn, the son of King Robert II of Scotland, which was necessary to his legal claim for the Earldom of Strathearn.

=== Consequences ===
Because the lineage of Robert II was of then a matter of some controversy, the patent was withdrawn in 1633 and he was created Earl of Airth instead. He subsequently lost the favor of Charles I. Airth is a small location which is well south-west of Aberfoyle, and therefore it was a title of some negativity. He was ordered to confine himself to Airth for four years, until he was restored to favour in 1637 and served against the Covenanters. In 1639, 1644, and 1645, and remaining staunch to the royal cause not withstanding the penalty imposed on him by Charles I, he served in the Parliaments, and in 1639 he was reappointed as a Privy Councillor, likely because of his refusal to take the covenants.

== Loss of position ==
During this time, Airth Castle was made a garrison by Cromwell's invading troops, and the Earl was ordered to cut down the woods in Aberfoyle parish. The crops were wasted and burned by the Cromwell's general, George Monck. The losses sustained by the Earl of Airth were never recouped, and overwhelmed, he was forced to part with nearly all of his lands to gain enough money to recover his estate.

== Death and heritage ==
The Earl of Airth died, likely after the month of April, in 1661. He had seven sons (John, James, Andrew, Robert, Patrick, Charles, Archibald) and four daughters (Mary, Margaret, Anne, and Jean).

His son John Graham married Lady Mary Keith, and died leaving a son, William Graham, who succeeded to his grandfather's titles.

Legal offices
Preceded by The Earl of Argyll	Lord Justice General; 1628–1638	Succeeded by Sir William Elphinstone
Peerage of Scotland
Preceded by John Graham	Earl of Menteith c.1598–1661	Succeeded by William Graham
New creation	Earl of Airth; 1633–1661	Succeeded by William Graham
