= Baron Dockwra =

Baron Dockwra, of Culmore, was a title in the Peerage of Ireland. It was created in 1621 for the soldier and statesman Sir Henry Dockwra, a native of Crookham, Berkshire, who helped quell the rebellion in Ulster in 1600, and is widely regarded as the founder of Derry. The title became extinct on the death of his son, the second Baron, without issue, in 1647.

== Barons Dockwra (1621) ==
- Henry Dockwra, 1st Baron Dockwra (c. 1568–1631)
- Theodore Dockwra, 2nd Baron Dockwra (c. 1609–1647)
