= Lord Fraser =

Title in Scotland

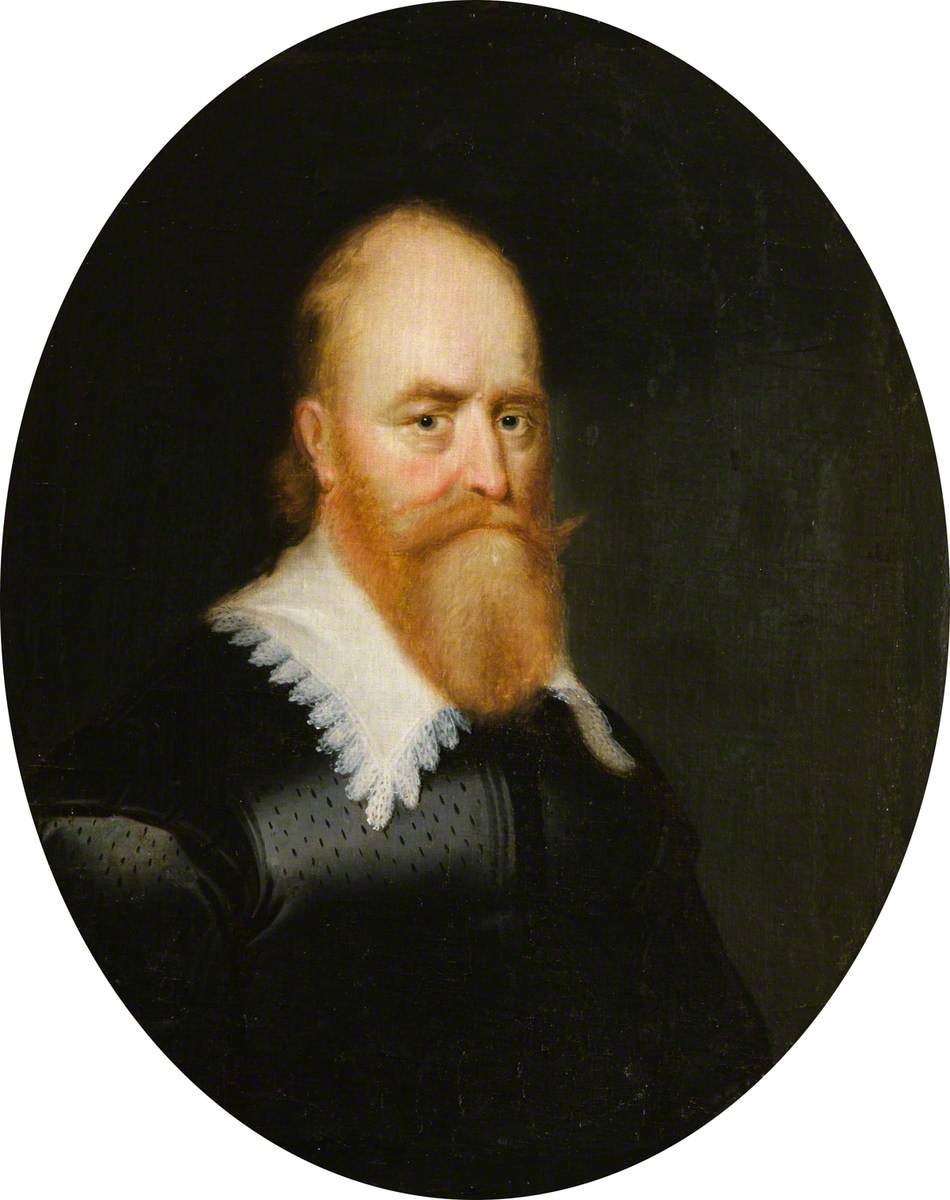
Portrait of Andrew Fraser, 1st Lord Fraser painted by George Jamesone.

The Lordship of Fraser was created in the Peerage of Scotland on 29 June 1633. when granted by letters patent to Andrew Fraser and his male descendants. The peerage expired in 1720, with the death of the 4th Lord Fraser, as a result of his participation in The Fifteen.

== Lords Fraser (1633) ==
- Andrew Fraser, 1st Lord Fraser (died 1636)
- Andrew Fraser, 2nd Lord Fraser (died 1657)
- Andrew Fraser, 3rd Lord Fraser (died 1674)
- Charles Fraser, 4th Lord Fraser (died 1720)

== Jacobite peerage ==
The 4th Lord Fraser's wife Margaret, née Erskine, had previously been married to Simon Fraser of Inverallochy. Margaret and Simon's grandson Charles Fraser of Inverallochy was created Lord Fraser of Muchalls in the Jacobite peerage on 20 July 1723.
