= Willoughby (surname) =

Willoughby is a surname. Notable people with the surname include:

- Alex Willoughby, British footballer
- Althea Willoughby (1904–1982), British artist
- Barrett Willoughby (1901–1959), American writer
- Bart Willoughby (born 1960), Pitjantjatjara (Indigenous Australian) musician
- Benjamin Willoughby (1855–1940), Justice of the Indiana Supreme Court
- Bill Willoughby (born 1957), American professional basketball player
- Charl Willoughby (born 1974), South African cricketer
- Charles A. Willoughby (1892–1972), American major general
- Claude Willoughby (1898–1973), American baseball player
- Francis Willoughby (disambiguation), several people called Francis Willoughby or Willughby
- George Willoughby (disambiguation), several people
- Henry Willoughby (disambiguation), several people
- Holly Willoughby (born 1981), English television presenter
- Hugh de Willoughby, English medieval theologian and university chancellor
- Hugh Willoughby (disambiguation), several people
- India Willoughby (born 1965), British newsreader
- John Willoughby (disambiguation), several people
- Kim Willoughby (born 1980), American volleyball player
- Leonard Ashley Willoughby (1885–1977), British scholar of German literature
- Lillian Willoughby (1916–2009), American peace activist
- L. Jean Willoughby (1925–2015), American politician
- Marlene Willoughby (born 1948), American pornographic actress
- Meta Fust Willoughby (1887-1937) American composer who used the pseudonym Meta Schumann
- Nesbit Willoughby (1777–1849), British Royal Navy rear admiral
- Percival Willoughby (died 1643), MP for Nottinghamshire and businessman
- Westel Willoughby Jr. (1769–1844), American politician
- Westel W. Willoughby (1867–1945), American political theorist, twin brother of William F. Willoughby
- William Willoughby (disambiguation), several people

== See also ==
- Baron Willoughby de Broke (1491)
- Baron Willoughby de Eresby (1313)
- Baron Willoughby of Parham (1547)
- Willoughby baronets
- Richard Willoughby (judge) (d. 1325), Chief Justice of the Irish Common Pleas and MP for Nottinghamshire in 1318
- Richard de Willoughby (d. 1362), Lord Chief Justice of England and MP for Nottinghamshire, most famous for being kidnapped by the Folville Gang
