= List of peers 1770–1779 =

This page lists all peers who held extant titles between 1770 and 1779.

== Peerage of England, Scotland and Great Britain ==
=== Dukes ===
Title	Holder	Date gained	Date lost	Notes
Peerage of England
Duke of Cornwall (1337)	George, Prince of Wales	1762	1820	
Duke of Norfolk (1483)	Edward Howard, 9th Duke of Norfolk	1732	1777	Died
Duke of Norfolk (1483)	Charles Howard, 10th Duke of Norfolk	1777	1786	
Duke of Somerset (1547)	Edward Seymour, 9th Duke of Somerset	1757	1792	
Duke of Cleveland (1670)	William FitzRoy, 3rd Duke of Cleveland	1730	1774	Died, title extinct
Duke of Richmond (1675)	Charles Lennox, 3rd Duke of Richmond	1750	1806	
Duke of Grafton (1675)	Augustus FitzRoy, 3rd Duke of Grafton	1757	1811	
Duke of Beaufort (1682)	Henry Somerset, 5th Duke of Beaufort	1756	1803	
Duke of St Albans (1684)	George Beauclerk, 3rd Duke of St Albans	1751	1786	
Duke of Bolton (1689)	Harry Powlett, 6th Duke of Bolton	1765	1794	
Duke of Leeds (1694)	Thomas Osborne, 4th Duke of Leeds	1731	1789	
Duke of Bedford (1694)	John Russell, 4th Duke of Bedford	1732	1771	Died
Duke of Bedford (1694)	Francis Russell, 5th Duke of Bedford	1771	1802	
Duke of Devonshire (1694)	William Cavendish, 5th Duke of Devonshire	1764	1811	
Duke of Marlborough (1702)	George Spencer, 4th Duke of Marlborough	1758	1817	
Duke of Rutland (1703)	John Manners, 3rd Duke of Rutland	1721	1779	Died
Duke of Rutland (1703)	Charles Manners, 4th Duke of Rutland	1779	1787	
Peerage of Scotland
Duke of Hamilton (1643)	Douglas Hamilton, 8th Duke of Hamilton	1769	1799	
Duke of Buccleuch (1663)	Henry Scott, 3rd Duke of Buccleuch	1751	1812	
Duke of Queensberry (1684)	Charles Douglas, 3rd Duke of Queensberry	1711	1778	Died
Duke of Queensberry (1684)	William Douglas, 4th Duke of Queensberry	1778	1810	
Duke of Gordon (1684)	Alexander Gordon, 4th Duke of Gordon	1752	1827	
Duke of Argyll (1701)	John Campbell, 4th Duke of Argyll	1761	1770	Died
Duke of Argyll (1701)	John Campbell, 5th Duke of Argyll	1770	1806	
Duke of Atholl (1703)	John Murray, 3rd Duke of Atholl	1764	1774	Died
Duke of Atholl (1703)	John Murray, 4th Duke of Atholl	1774	1830	
Duke of Montrose (1707)	William Graham, 2nd Duke of Montrose	1742	1790	
Duke of Roxburghe (1707)	John Ker, 3rd Duke of Roxburghe	1755	1804	
Peerage of Great Britain
Duke of Ancaster and Kesteven (1715)	Peregrine Bertie, 3rd Duke of Ancaster and Kesteven	1742	1778	Died
Duke of Ancaster and Kesteven (1715)	Robert Bertie, 4th Duke of Ancaster and Kesteven	1778	1779	Died
Duke of Ancaster and Kesteven (1715)	Brownlow Bertie, 5th Duke of Ancaster and Kesteven	1779	1809	
Duke of Kingston-upon-Hull (1715)	Evelyn Pierrepont, 2nd Duke of Kingston-upon-Hull	1726	1773	Died, title extinct
Duke of Portland (1716)	William Cavendish-Bentinck, 3rd Duke of Portland	1762	1809	
Duke of Manchester (1719)	George Montagu, 4th Duke of Manchester	1762	1788	
Duke of Chandos (1719)	Henry Brydges, 2nd Duke of Chandos	1744	1771	Died
Duke of Chandos (1719)	James Brydges, 3rd Duke of Chandos	1771	1789	
Duke of Dorset (1720)	John Sackville, 3rd Duke of Dorset	1769	1799	
Duke of Bridgewater (1720)	Francis Egerton, 3rd Duke of Bridgewater	1748	1803	
Duke of Newcastle (1756)	Henry Pelham-Clinton, 2nd Duke of Newcastle	1768	1794	
Duke of Gloucester and Edinburgh (1764)	Prince William Henry, Duke of Gloucester and Edinburgh	1764	1805	
Duke of Northumberland (1766)	Hugh Percy, 1st Duke of Northumberland	1766	1786	
Duke of Cumberland and Strathearn (1766)	Prince Henry, Duke of Cumberland and Strathearn	1766	1790	
Duke of Montagu (1766)	George Montagu, 1st Duke of Montagu	1766	1790	

=== Marquesses ===
Title	Holder	Date gained	Date lost	Notes
Peerage of England
-
Peerage of Scotland
Marquess of Tweeddale (1694)	George Hay, 5th Marquess of Tweeddale	1762	1770	Died
Marquess of Tweeddale (1694)	George Hay, 6th Marquess of Tweeddale	1770	1787	
Marquess of Lothian (1701)	William Kerr, 4th Marquess of Lothian	1767	1775	Died
Marquess of Lothian (1701)	William Kerr, 5th Marquess of Lothian	1775	1815	
Marquess of Annandale (1701)	George Vanden-Bempde, 3rd Marquess of Annandale	1730	1792	
Peerage of Great Britain
Marquess Grey (1740)	Jemima Yorke, 2nd Marchioness Grey	1740	1797	
Marquess of Rockingham (1746)	Charles Watson-Wentworth, 2nd Marquess of Rockingham	1750	1782	

=== Earls ===
Title	Holder	Date gained	Date lost	Notes
Peerage of England
Earl of Shrewsbury (1442)	George Talbot, 14th Earl of Shrewsbury	1743	1787	
Earl of Derby (1485)	Edward Stanley, 11th Earl of Derby	1736	1776	Died
Earl of Derby (1485)	Edward Smith-Stanley, 12th Earl of Derby	1776	1834	
Earl of Huntingdon (1529)	Francis Hastings, 10th Earl of Huntingdon	1746	1789	
Earl of Pembroke (1551)	Henry Herbert, 10th Earl of Pembroke	1749	1794	
Earl of Devon (1553)	William Courtenay, de jure 8th Earl of Devon	1762	1788	
Earl of Suffolk (1603)	Henry Howard, 12th Earl of Suffolk	1757	1779	Died
Earl of Suffolk (1603)	Henry Howard, 13th Earl of Suffolk	1779	1779	
Earl of Suffolk (1603)	Thomas Howard, 14th Earl of Suffolk	1779	1783	
Earl of Exeter (1605)	Brownlow Cecil, 9th Earl of Exeter	1754	1793	
Earl of Salisbury (1605)	James Cecil, 6th Earl of Salisbury	1728	1780	
Earl of Northampton (1618)	Spencer Compton, 8th Earl of Northampton	1763	1796	
Earl of Denbigh (1622)	Basil Feilding, 6th Earl of Denbigh	1755	1800	
Earl of Westmorland (1624)	Thomas Fane, 8th Earl of Westmorland	1762	1771	Died
Earl of Westmorland (1624)	John Fane, 9th Earl of Westmorland	1771	1774	Died
Earl of Westmorland (1624)	John Fane, 10th Earl of Westmorland	1774	1841	
Earl of Peterborough (1628)	Charles Mordaunt, 4th Earl of Peterborough	1735	1779	Died
Earl of Peterborough (1628)	Charles Henry Mordaunt, 5th Earl of Peterborough	1779	1814	
Earl of Stamford (1628)	George Grey, 5th Earl of Stamford	1768	1819	
Earl of Winchilsea (1628)	George Finch, 9th Earl of Winchilsea	1769	1826	
Earl of Chesterfield (1628)	Philip Stanhope, 4th Earl of Chesterfield	1726	1773	Died
Earl of Chesterfield (1628)	Philip Stanhope, 5th Earl of Chesterfield	1773	1815	
Earl of Thanet (1628)	Sackville Tufton, 8th Earl of Thanet	1753	1786	
Earl of Sandwich (1660)	John Montagu, 4th Earl of Sandwich	1729	1792	
Earl of Essex (1661)	William Capell, 4th Earl of Essex	1743	1799	
Earl of Carlisle (1661)	Frederick Howard, 5th Earl of Carlisle	1758	1825	
Earl of Shaftesbury (1672)	Anthony Ashley Cooper, 4th Earl of Shaftesbury	1713	1771	Died
Earl of Shaftesbury (1672)	Anthony Ashley-Cooper, 5th Earl of Shaftesbury	1771	1811	
Earl of Lichfield (1674)	George Lee, 3rd Earl of Lichfield	1742	1772	Died
Earl of Lichfield (1674)	Robert Lee, 4th Earl of Lichfield	1772	1776	Died, title extinct
Earl of Berkeley (1679)	Frederick Augustus Berkeley, 5th Earl of Berkeley	1755	1810	
Earl of Abingdon (1682)	Willoughby Bertie, 4th Earl of Abingdon	1760	1799	
Earl of Gainsborough (1682)	Henry Noel, 6th Earl of Gainsborough	1759	1798	
Earl of Plymouth (1682)	Other Windsor, 4th Earl of Plymouth	1732	1771	Died
Earl of Plymouth (1682)	Other Windsor, 5th Earl of Plymouth	1771	1799	
Earl of Holderness (1682)	Robert Darcy, 4th Earl of Holderness	1722	1778	Died, title extinct
Earl of Scarbrough (1690)	Richard Lumley-Saunderson, 4th Earl of Scarbrough	1752	1782	
Earl of Rochford (1695)	William Nassau de Zuylestein, 4th Earl of Rochford	1738	1781	
Earl of Albemarle (1697)	George Keppel, 3rd Earl of Albemarle	1754	1772	Died
Earl of Albemarle (1697)	William Keppel, 4th Earl of Albemarle	1772	1849	
Earl of Coventry (1697)	George Coventry, 6th Earl of Coventry	1751	1809	
Earl of Jersey (1697)	George Villiers, 4th Earl of Jersey	1769	1805	
Earl Poulett (1706)	Vere Poulett, 3rd Earl Poulett	1764	1788	
Earl of Cholmondeley (1706)	George Cholmondeley, 3rd Earl of Cholmondeley	1733	1770	
Earl of Cholmondeley (1706)	George James Cholmondeley, 4th Earl of Cholmondeley	1770	1827	
Peerage of Scotland
Earl of Crawford (1398)	George Lindsay-Crawford, 21st Earl of Crawford	1749	1781	
Earl of Erroll (1452)	James Hay, 15th Earl of Erroll	1758	1778	Died
Earl of Erroll (1452)	George Hay, 16th Earl of Erroll	1778	1798	
Earl of Sutherland (1235)	Elizabeth Gordon, 19th Countess of Sutherland	1766	1839	
Earl of Rothes (1458)	John Leslie, 11th Earl of Rothes	1767	1773	Died
Earl of Rothes (1458)	Jane Elizabeth Leslie, 12th Countess of Rothes	1773	1810	
Earl of Morton (1458)	Sholto Douglas, 15th Earl of Morton	1768	1774	Died
Earl of Morton (1458)	George Douglas, 16th Earl of Morton	1774	1827	
Earl of Glencairn (1488)	William Cunningham, 13th Earl of Glencairn	1734	1775	Died
Earl of Glencairn (1488)	James Cunningham, 14th Earl of Glencairn	1775	1791	
Earl of Eglinton (1507)	Archibald Montgomerie, 11th Earl of Eglinton	1769	1796	
Earl of Cassilis (1509)	Thomas Kennedy, 9th Earl of Cassilis	1759	1775	Died
Earl of Cassilis (1509)	David Kennedy, 10th Earl of Cassilis	1775	1792	
Earl of Caithness (1455)	William Sinclair, 10th Earl of Caithness	1765	1779	Died
Earl of Caithness (1455)	John Sinclair, 11th Earl of Caithness	1779	1789	
Earl of Buchan (1469)	David Erskine, 11th Earl of Buchan	1767	1829	
Earl of Moray (1562)	Francis Stuart, 9th Earl of Moray	1767	1810	
Earl of Home (1605)	Alexander Home, 9th Earl of Home	1761	1786	
Earl of Abercorn (1606)	James Hamilton, 8th Earl of Abercorn	1744	1789	
Earl of Strathmore and Kinghorne (1606)	John Bowes, 9th Earl of Strathmore and Kinghorne	1753	1776	Died
Earl of Strathmore and Kinghorne (1606)	John Bowes, 10th Earl of Strathmore and Kinghorne	1776	1820	
Earl of Kellie (1619)	Thomas Erskine, 6th Earl of Kellie	1758	1781	
Earl of Haddington (1619)	Thomas Hamilton, 7th Earl of Haddington	1735	1794	
Earl of Galloway (1623)	Alexander Stewart, 6th Earl of Galloway	1746	1773	Died
Earl of Galloway (1623)	John Stewart, 7th Earl of Galloway	1773	1806	
Earl of Lauderdale (1624)	James Maitland, 7th Earl of Lauderdale	1744	1789	
Earl of Loudoun (1633)	John Campbell, 4th Earl of Loudoun	1731	1782	
Earl of Kinnoull (1633)	Thomas Hay, 9th Earl of Kinnoull	1758	1787	
Earl of Dumfries (1633)	Patrick McDouall-Crichton, 6th Earl of Dumfries	1769	1803	
Earl of Elgin (1633)	Charles Bruce, 5th Earl of Elgin	1747	1771	Died
Earl of Elgin (1633)	William Robert Bruce, 6th Earl of Elgin	1771	1771	Died
Earl of Elgin (1633)	Thomas Bruce, 7th Earl of Elgin	1771	1841	
Earl of Traquair (1633)	John Stewart, 6th Earl of Traquair	1764	1779	Died
Earl of Traquair (1633)	Charles Stewart, 7th Earl of Traquair	1779	1827	
Earl of Dalhousie (1633)	George Ramsay, 8th Earl of Dalhousie	1764	1787	
Earl of Findlater (1638)	James Ogilvy, 6th Earl of Findlater	1764	1770	Died
Earl of Findlater (1638)	James Ogilvy, 7th Earl of Findlater	1770	1811	
Earl of Leven (1641)	David Leslie, 6th Earl of Leven	1754	1802	
Earl of Dysart (1643)	Lionel Tollemache, 4th Earl of Dysart	1727	1770	Died
Earl of Dysart (1643)	Lionel Tollemache, 5th Earl of Dysart	1770	1799	
Earl of Selkirk (1646)	Dunbar Douglas, 4th Earl of Selkirk	1744	1799	
Earl of Northesk (1647)	George Carnegie, 6th Earl of Northesk	1741	1792	
Earl of Balcarres (1651)	Alexander Lindsay, 6th Earl of Balcarres	1768	1825	
Earl of Aboyne (1660)	Charles Gordon, 4th Earl of Aboyne	1732	1794	
Earl of Newburgh (1660)	James Radclyffe, 4th Earl of Newburgh	1755	1786	
Earl of Dundonald (1669)	Thomas Cochrane, 8th Earl of Dundonald	1758	1778	Died
Earl of Dundonald (1669)	Archibald Cochrane, 9th Earl of Dundonald	1778	1831	
Earl of Kintore (1677)	Anthony Keith-Falconer, 5th Earl of Kintore	1778	1804	Revived after dormancy
Earl of Breadalbane and Holland (1677)	John Campbell, 3rd Earl of Breadalbane and Holland	1752	1782	
Earl of Aberdeen (1682)	George Gordon, 3rd Earl of Aberdeen	1746	1801	
Earl of Dunmore (1686)	John Murray, 4th Earl of Dunmore	1752	1809	
Earl of Orkney (1696)	Mary O'Brien, 3rd Countess of Orkney	1756	1790	
Earl of March (1697)	William Douglas, 3rd Earl of March	1731	1810	Succeeded to the Dukedom of Queensberry, see above
Earl of Marchmont (1697)	Hugh Hume-Campbell, 3rd Earl of Marchmont	1740	1794	
Earl of Hyndford (1701)	John Carmichael, 4th Earl of Hyndford	1766	1787	
Earl of Stair (1703)	John Dalrymple, 5th Earl of Stair	1768	1789	
Earl of Rosebery (1703)	Neil Primrose, 3rd Earl of Rosebery	1765	1814	
Earl of Glasgow (1703)	John Boyle, 3rd Earl of Glasgow	1740	1775	Died
Earl of Glasgow (1703)	George Boyle, 4th Earl of Glasgow	1775	1843	
Earl of Portmore (1703)	Charles Colyear, 2nd Earl of Portmore	1730	1785	
Earl of Bute (1703)	John Stuart, 3rd Earl of Bute	1723	1792	
Earl of Hopetoun (1703)	John Hope, 2nd Earl of Hopetoun	1742	1781	
Earl of Deloraine (1706)	Henry Scott, 4th Earl of Deloraine	1740	1807	
Peerage of Great Britain
Earl of Oxford and Mortimer (1711)	Edward Harley, 4th Earl of Oxford and Earl Mortimer	1755	1790	
Earl of Strafford (1711)	William Wentworth, 2nd Earl of Strafford	1739	1791	
Earl Ferrers (1711)	Washington Shirley, 5th Earl Ferrers	1760	1778	Died
Earl Ferrers (1711)	Robert Shirley, 6th Earl Ferrers	1778	1787	
Earl of Dartmouth (1711)	William Legge, 2nd Earl of Dartmouth	1750	1801	
Earl of Tankerville (1714)	Charles Bennet, 4th Earl of Tankerville	1767	1822	
Earl of Aylesford (1714)	Heneage Finch, 3rd Earl of Aylesford	1757	1777	Died
Earl of Aylesford (1714)	Heneage Finch, 4th Earl of Aylesford	1777	1812	
Earl of Bristol (1714)	George Hervey, 2nd Earl of Bristol	1751	1775	Died
Earl of Bristol (1714)	Augustus Hervey, 3rd Earl of Bristol	1775	1779	Died
Earl of Bristol (1714)	Frederick Hervey, 4th Earl of Bristol	1779	1803	
Earl Granville (1715)	Robert Carteret, 3rd Earl Granville	1763	1776	Died; Peerage extinct
Earl of Halifax (1715)	George Montagu-Dunk, 2nd Earl of Halifax	1739	1771	Died; Peerage extinct
Earl of Sussex (1717)	Henry Yelverton, 3rd Earl of Sussex	1758	1799	
Earl Cowper (1718)	George Clavering-Cowper, 3rd Earl Cowper	1764	1789	
Earl Stanhope (1718)	Philip Stanhope, 2nd Earl Stanhope	1721	1786	
Earl of Harborough (1719)	Bennet Sherard, 3rd Earl of Harborough	1750	1770	Died
Earl of Harborough (1719)	Robert Sherard, 4th Earl of Harborough	1770	1799	
Earl of Macclesfield (1721)	Thomas Parker, 3rd Earl of Macclesfield	1764	1795	
Earl of Pomfret (1721)	George Fermor, 2nd Earl of Pomfret	1753	1785	
Countess of Walsingham (1722)	Melusina von der Schulenburg, Countess of Walsingham	1722	1778	Died; Peerage extinct
Earl Waldegrave (1729)	John Waldegrave, 3rd Earl Waldegrave	1763	1784	
Earl of Ashburnham (1730)	John Ashburnham, 2nd Earl of Ashburnham	1737	1812	
Earl of Effingham (1731)	Thomas Howard, 3rd Earl of Effingham	1763	1791	
Earl of Orford (1742)	George Walpole, 3rd Earl of Orford	1751	1791	
Earl of Harrington (1742)	William Stanhope, 2nd Earl of Harrington	1756	1779	Died
Earl of Harrington (1742)	Charles Stanhope, 3rd Earl of Harrington	1779	1829	
Earl of Portsmouth (1743)	John Wallop, 2nd Earl of Portsmouth	1762	1797	
Earl Brooke (1746)	Francis Greville, 1st Earl Brooke	1746	1773	Died
Earl Brooke (1746)	George Greville, 2nd Earl Brooke	1773	1816	
Earl Gower (1746)	Granville Leveson-Gower, 2nd Earl Gower	1754	1803	
Earl of Buckinghamshire (1746)	John Hobart, 2nd Earl of Buckinghamshire	1756	1793	
Earl Fitzwilliam (1746)	William Fitzwilliam, 2nd Earl Fitzwilliam	1756	1833	
Earl of Powis (1748)	Henry Herbert, 1st Earl of Powis	1748	1772	Died
Earl of Powis (1748)	George Herbert, 2nd Earl of Powis	1772	1801	
Earl of Egremont (1748)	George Wyndham, 3rd Earl of Egremont	1763	1837	
Earl Temple (1749)	Richard Grenville-Temple, 2nd Earl Temple	1752	1779	Died
Earl Temple (1749)	George Nugent-Temple-Grenville, 3rd Earl Temple	1779	1813	
Earl Harcourt (1749)	Simon Harcourt, 1st Earl Harcourt	1749	1777	Died
Earl Harcourt (1749)	George Harcourt, 2nd Earl Harcourt	1777	1809	
Earl of Hertford (1750)	Francis Seymour-Conway, 1st Earl of Hertford	1750	1794	
Earl of Guilford (1752)	Francis North, 1st Earl of Guilford	1752	1790	
Earl Cornwallis (1753)	Charles Cornwallis, 2nd Earl Cornwallis	1762	1805	
Earl of Hardwicke (1754)	Philip Yorke, 2nd Earl of Hardwicke	1764	1790	
Earl of Darlington (1754)	Henry Vane, 2nd Earl of Darlington	1758	1792	
Earl Fauconberg (1756)	Thomas Belasyse, 1st Earl Fauconberg	1756	1774	Died
Earl Fauconberg (1756)	Henry Belasyse, 2nd Earl Fauconberg	1774	1802	
Earl of Ilchester (1756)	Stephen Fox-Strangways, 1st Earl of Ilchester	1756	1776	Died
Earl of Ilchester (1756)	Henry Fox-Strangways, 2nd Earl of Ilchester	1776	1802	
Earl De La Warr (1761)	John West, 2nd Earl De La Warr	1766	1777	Died
Earl De La Warr (1761)	William West, 3rd Earl De La Warr	1777	1783	
Earl Talbot (1761)	William Talbot, 1st Earl Talbot	1761	1782	
Earl of Northington (1764)	Robert Henley, 1st Earl of Northington	1764	1772	Died
Earl of Northington (1764)	Robert Henley, 2nd Earl of Northington	1772	1786	
Earl of Radnor (1765)	William Bouverie, 1st Earl of Radnor	1765	1776	Died
Earl of Radnor (1765)	Jacob Pleydell-Bouverie, 2nd Earl of Radnor	1776	1828	
Earl Spencer (1765)	John Spencer, 1st Earl Spencer	1765	1783	
Earl of Chatham (1766)	William Pitt, 1st Earl of Chatham	1766	1778	Died
Earl of Chatham (1766)	John Pitt, 2nd Earl of Chatham	1778	1835	
Earl Ligonier (1766)	John Ligonier, 1st Earl Ligonier	1766	1770	Died; title extinct
Earl Bathurst (1772)	Allen Bathurst, 1st Earl Bathurst	1772	1775	New creation; died
Earl Bathurst (1772)	Henry Bathurst, 2nd Earl Bathurst	1775	1794	
Earl of Hillsborough (1772)	Wills Hill, 1st Earl of Hillsborough	1772	1793	New creation
Earl of Ailesbury (1776)	Thomas Brudenell-Bruce, 1st Earl of Ailesbury	1776	1814	New creation
Earl of Clarendon (1776)	Thomas Villiers, 1st Earl of Clarendon	1776	1786	New creation
Earl of Mansfield (1776)	William Murray, 1st Earl of Mansfield	1776	1793	New creation

=== Viscounts ===
Title	Holder	Date gained	Date lost	Notes
Peerage of England
Viscount Hereford (1550)	Edward Devereux, 12th Viscount Hereford	1760	1783	
Viscount Montagu (1554)	Anthony Browne, 7th Viscount Montagu	1767	1787	
Viscount Saye and Sele (1624)	Richard Fiennes, 6th Viscount Saye and Sele	1742	1781	
Viscount Townshend (1682)	George Townshend, 4th Viscount Townshend	1764	1807	
Viscount Weymouth (1682)	Thomas Thynne, 3rd Viscount Weymouth	1751	1796	
Peerage of Scotland
Viscount of Falkland (1620)	Lucius Cary, 7th Viscount Falkland	1730	1785	
Viscount of Stormont (1621)	David Murray, 7th Viscount of Stormont	1748	1796	
Viscount of Arbuthnott (1641)	John Arbuthnot, 6th Viscount of Arbuthnott	1756	1791	
Viscount of Irvine (1661)	Charles Ingram, 9th Viscount of Irvine	1763	1778	Died; Peerage extinct
Peerage of Great Britain
Viscount Bolingbroke (1712)	Frederick St John, 2nd Viscount Bolingbroke	1751	1787	
Viscount Falmouth (1720)	Hugh Boscawen, 2nd Viscount Falmouth	1734	1782	
Viscount Torrington (1721)	George Byng, 4th Viscount Torrington	1750	1812	
Viscount Leinster (1747)	James FitzGerald, 1st Viscount Leinster	1747	1773	Died; Duke of Leinster in the Peerage of Ireland
Viscount Leinster (1747)	William FitzGerald, 2nd Viscount Leinster	1773	1804	Duke of Leinster in the Peerage of Ireland
Viscount Courtenay (1762)	William Courtenay, 2nd Viscount Courtenay	1762	1788	
Viscount Wentworth (1762)	Edward Noel, 1st Viscount Wentworth	1762	1774	Died
Viscount Wentworth (1762)	Thomas Noel, 2nd Viscount Wentworth	1774	1815	
Viscount Dudley and Ward (1763)	John Ward, 1st Viscount Dudley and Ward	1763	1774	Died
Viscount Dudley and Ward (1763)	John Ward, 2nd Viscount Dudley and Ward	1774	1788	
Viscount Maynard (1766)	Charles Maynard, 1st Viscount Maynard	1766	1775	Died
Viscount Maynard (1766)	Charles Maynard, 2nd Viscount Maynard	1775	1824	
Viscount Hampden (1776)	Robert Hampden-Trevor, 1st Viscount Hampden	1776	1783	New creation

=== Barons ===
Title	Holder	Date gained	Date lost	Notes
Peerage of England
Baron le Despencer (1264)	Francis Dashwood, 11th Baron le Despencer	1763	1781	
Baron Clinton (1299)	Margaret Rolle, 15th Baroness Clinton	1760	1781	
Baron Ferrers of Chartley (1299)	Charlotte Townshend, 16th Baroness Ferrers of Chartley	1749	1770	Died
Baron Ferrers of Chartley (1299)	George Townshend, 17th Baron Ferrers of Chartley	1770	1811	
Baron de Clifford (1299)	Margaret Coke, 19th Baroness de Clifford	1734	1775	Died, Barony fell into abeyance
Baron de Clifford (1299)	Edward Southwell, 20th Baron de Clifford	1776	1777	Abeyance terminated
Baron de Clifford (1299)	Edward Southwell, 21st Baron de Clifford	1777	1832	
Baron Botetourt (1305)	Norborne Berkeley, 4th Baron Botetourt	1764	1770	Died, Barony fell into abeyance
Baron Audley (1313)	George Thicknesse, 19th Baron Audley	1777	1818	Barony previously held by the Earl of Castlehaven
Baron Dacre (1321)	Thomas Barrett-Lennard, 17th Baron Dacre	1755	1786	
Baron Stourton (1448)	William Stourton, 16th Baron Stourton	1753	1781	
Baron Willoughby de Broke (1491)	John Peyto-Verney, 14th Baron Willoughby de Broke	1752	1816	
Baron Willoughby of Parham (1547)	Henry Willoughby, 16th Baron Willoughby of Parham	1767	1775	Died
Baron Willoughby of Parham (1547)	George Willoughby, 17th Baron Willoughby of Parham	1775	1779	Died, title extinct
Baron Paget (1552)	Henry Paget, 9th Baron Paget	1769	1812	
Baron St John of Bletso (1559)	Henry St John, 13th Baron St John of Bletso	1767	1805	
Baron Petre (1603)	Robert Petre, 9th Baron Petre	1742	1801	
Baron Arundell of Wardour (1605)	Henry Arundell, 8th Baron Arundell of Wardour	1756	1808	
Baron Dormer (1615)	John Dormer, 7th Baron Dormer	1761	1785	
Baron Teynham (1616)	Henry Roper, 10th Baron Teynham	1727	1781	
Baron Craven (1627)	William Craven, 6th Baron Craven	1769	1791	
Baron Strange (1628)	Charlotte Murray, 8th Baroness Strange	1764	1805	
Baron Leigh (1643)	Edward Leigh, 5th Baron Leigh	1749	1786	
Baron Byron (1643)	William Byron, 5th Baron Byron	1736	1798	
Baron Langdale (1658)	Marmaduke Langdale, 4th Baron Langdale	1718	1771	Died
Baron Langdale (1658)	Marmaduke Langdale, 5th Baron Langdale	1771	1777	Died, title extinct
Baron Berkeley of Stratton (1658)	John Berkeley, 5th Baron Berkeley of Stratton	1741	1773	Died, title extinct
Baron Delamer (1661)	Nathaniel Booth, 4th Baron Delamer	1758	1770	Died, title extinct
Baron Clifford of Chudleigh (1672)	Hugh Clifford, 4th Baron Clifford of Chudleigh	1732	1783	
Baron Willoughby of Parham (1680)	Henry Willoughby, 16th Baron Willoughby of Parham	1767	1775	Died
Baron Willoughby of Parham (1680)	George Willoughby, 17th Baron Willoughby of Parham	1775	1779	Died, title extinct
Peerage of Scotland
Lord Somerville (1430)	James Somerville, 14th Lord Somerville	1765	1796	
Lord Forbes (1442)	James Forbes, 16th Lord Forbes	1761	1804	
Lord Saltoun (1445)	George Fraser, 15th Lord Saltoun	1748	1781	
Lord Gray (1445)	John Gray, 11th Lord Gray	1738	1782	
Lord Borthwick (1452)	Henry Borthwick, 14th Lord Borthwick	1762	1772	Died, peerage dormant
Lord Cathcart (1460)	Charles Cathcart, 9th Lord Cathcart	1740	1776	Died
Lord Cathcart (1460)	William Cathcart, 10th Lord Cathcart	1776	1843	
Lord Sempill (1489)	John Sempill, 13th Lord Sempill	1746	1782	
Lord Elphinstone (1509)	Charles Elphinstone, 10th Lord Elphinstone	1757	1781	
Lord Torphichen (1564)	James Sandilands, 9th Lord Torphichen	1765	1815	
Lord Lindores (1600)	James Francis Leslie, 7th Lord Lindores	1765	1775	
Lord Lindores (1600)	John Leslie, 8th Lord Lindores	1775	1813	
Lord Colville of Culross (1604)	Alexander Colville, 7th Lord Colville of Culross	1741	1770	Died
Lord Colville of Culross (1604)	John Colville, 8th Lord Colville of Culross	1770	1811	
Lord Blantyre (1606)	William Stuart, 9th Lord Blantyre	1751	1776	Died
Lord Blantyre (1606)	Alexander Stuart, 10th Lord Blantyre	1776	1783	
Lord Cranstoun (1609)	James Cranstoun, 6th Lord Cranstoun	1727	1773	Died
Lord Cranstoun (1609)	William Cranstoun, 7th Lord Cranstoun	1773	1778	Died
Lord Cranstoun (1609)	James Cranstoun, 8th Lord Cranstoun	1778	1796	
Lord Aston of Forfar (1627)	Walter Aston, 8th Lord Aston of Forfar	1763	1805	
Lord Fairfax of Cameron (1627)	Thomas Fairfax, 6th Lord Fairfax of Cameron	1710	1781	
Lord Napier (1627)	Francis Napier, 6th Lord Napier	1706	1773	Died
Lord Napier (1627)	William Napier, 7th Lord Napier	1773	1775	Died
Lord Napier (1627)	Francis Napier, 8th Lord Napier	1775	1823	
Lord Reay (1628)	Hugh Mackay, 6th Lord Reay	1768	1797	
Lord Kirkcudbright (1633)	John Maclellan, 8th Lord Kirkcudbright	1762	1801	
Lord Forrester (1633)	Caroline Cockburn of Ormistoun, 8th Lady Forrester	1763	1784	
Lord Banff (1642)	Alexander Ogilvy, 7th Lord Banff	1746	1771	Died
Lord Banff (1642)	William Ogilvy, 8th Lord Banff	1771	1803	
Lord Elibank (1643)	Patrick Murray, 5th Lord Elibank	1736	1778	Died
Lord Elibank (1643)	George Murray, 6th Lord Elibank	1778	1785	
Lord Falconer of Halkerton (1646)	William Falconer, 6th Lord Falconer of Halkerton	1762	1776	Died
Lord Falconer of Halkerton (1646)	Anthony Keith-Falconer, 7th Lord Falconer of Halkerton	1776	1804	Claimed the Earldom of Kintore in 1778, see above
Lord Belhaven and Stenton (1647)	James Hamilton, 5th Lord Belhaven and Stenton	1764	1777	Died
Lord Belhaven and Stenton (1647)	Robert Hamilton, 6th Lord Belhaven and Stenton	1777	1784	
Lord Rollo (1651)	John Rollo, 6th Lord Rollo	1763	1783	
Lord Ruthven of Freeland (1650)	Isobel Ruthven, 4th Lady Ruthven of Freeland	1722	1783	
Lord Bellenden (1661)	John Ker Bellenden, 5th Lord Bellenden	1753	1796	
Lord Kinnaird (1682)	George Kinnaird, 7th Lord Kinnaird	1767	1805	
