= Charles Willoughby =

Charles Willoughby may refer to:

- Charles Willoughby (politician) (1894–1995), member of Canadian Parliament
- Charles A. Willoughby (1892–1972), American military leader
- Charles Willoughby, 2nd Baron Willoughby of Parham (1536/7–1603), English peer
- Charles Willoughby, 10th Baron Willoughby of Parham (1650–1679), English peer
- Charles Willoughby, 14th Baron Willoughby of Parham (1681–1715), English peer
- Charles J. Willoughby Jr. (born 1978), American lawyer and judge

== See also ==
- Charl Willoughby (born 1974), South African cricketer
