= Thomas Willoughby, 11th Baron Willoughby of Parham =

English peer (1685–1691)

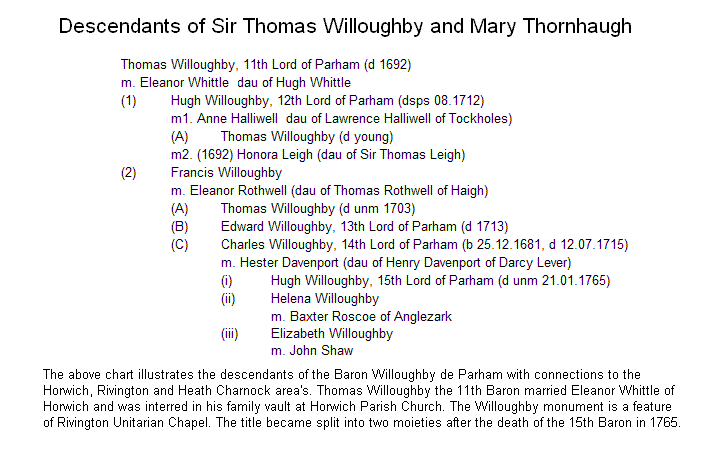
Descendants of Sir Thomas Willoughby and Mary Thornhaugh

Thomas Willoughby, 11th Baron Willoughby of Parham (c.1602–1691/92) was an English peer of the House of Lords. He was born in about 1602, son of Sir Thomas Willoughby and Mary Thornhaugh (Thornley), and grandson of Charles Willoughby, 2nd Baron Willoughby of Parham and Lady Margaret Clinton.

== Family ==
He married Eleanor Whittle, heiress and daughter of Hugh and Mary Whittle, of Horwich on 22 February 1639 (or 1640). After marriage they lived at Old Lord's Farm in Horwich, the area is still known as 'Old Lords Estate', the family inherited leases of a substantial amount of land from Horwich Moor to Anderton through the will of Nicolas Whittle of Horwich, 1597.The freeholder Sir Thomas Barton commissioned a map of 1620 which shows the Whittle holdings reflected in a large area of field names on the Rivington side of Horwich. These land holdings passed to the Shaw family, distributed in the will of Honourable Elizabeth Shaw in 1797. Thomas and Eleanor had two sons and three daughters, Hugh, the eldest son and Francis who in 1696 married Eleanor Rothwell of Haigh. Their daughters were Mary who married Samuel Greenhalgh of Adlington, Sarah and Abigail. Eleanor died aged 67 in 1665.

== Military and Civic Life ==
Thomas was a staunch puritan and is closely associated with dissenting religious bodies. During the English Civil War, he was a major and fought on the side of the Parliamentarians. He saw action in the first and second battles at Middlewich in 1643, and at the Bolton Massacre in 1644.

=== School Governor ===
He was a governor of Rivington Grammar School during the Commonwealth and after Restoration from 1650 until 1691. The school lacked income between 1650 and 1660 so Thomas travelled to London, York and Durham for affidavits and trials and secured the rental income for the school. In the school's records he is noted as Gentleman of Horwich. He served as Chairman of Governors in 1651, 1653–54, 1653, 1670, 1676 and 1683.

== Succession ==
Thomas was called to parliament by writ 19 May 1685 subsequent to there being no other heir known at the time of the death of his cousin, Charles Willoughby, 10th Baron Willoughby of Parham in 1679. He was called to parliament as the 11th Baron Willoughby of Parham 1547 creation, however, the writ had created a new Barony and with it a new title of 1st Baron Willoughby of Parham (1685 creation).

The title would have been inherited by Henry Willoughby, grandson of Sir Ambrose Willoughby, and great-grandson of Charles, the 2nd Baron. However, Henry Willoughby had emigrated to Virginia and his whereabouts was not known. The right to the first barony created by letters patent in 1547 was later claimed by a descendant of Henry Willoughby as 16th Baron Willoughby of Parham in 1767.

== Death ==
Thomas died in 1691 aged 89 and was buried under the chancel by the east window at the old Horwich Parish Church. Thomas was succeeded by his eldest son Hugh as the 12th Baron Willoughby of Parham, 2nd Baron of the 1685 creation.

Peerage of England
Preceded by Charles Willoughby	Baron Willoughby of Parham; 1679–1692	Succeeded by Hugh Willoughby
