= George Browne, 8th Viscount Montagu =

English nobleman

George Samuel Browne, 8th Viscount Montagu (26 June 1769 – October 1793) was an English nobleman.

While traveling in Europe with his friend Charles Sedley Burdett (second son of Francis Burdett), the two became obstinately determined to ride a fishing boat over the rapids of the Rhine at Laufenburg, despite the warnings of the local inhabitants, none of whom could be hired or persuaded to help them. They died in the attempt, and he was succeeded in the viscountcy by a distant cousin, a clergyman.

In the same week that the unfortunate Viscount met his death, the family home of Cowdray House was destroyed by fire; a circumstance which provided the foundation for a factitious legend of a "curse of fire and water" upon the Browne family for having received Battle Abbey at the dissolution of the monasteries. His sister, Elizabeth Mary, who was the eventual Browne heir in 1797, married, on 1 September 1794, William Stephen Poyntz. They lived at Midgham House in Berkshire and at Cowdray; as per the myth both their sons drowned at nearby Bognor Regis on 7 July 1815. As a result, the estate a generation later was sold by the surviving daughters mostly to George Perceval, 6th Earl of Egmont, and perhaps to Lord Leconfield, with Cowdray passing in 1908 to Weetman Pearson, 1st Viscount Cowdray.

Peerage of England
| Preceded by Anthony Browne | Viscount Montagu; 1787–1793 | Succeeded by Mark Browne |
