= Hugh Willoughby, 12th Baron Willoughby of Parham =

English peer

Hugh Willoughby, 12th Baron Willoughby of Parham (c.1637–1712) was an English peer of the House of Lords. He was the eldest son of Thomas Willoughby, 11th Baron Willoughby of Parham and his wife Eleanor, daughter of Hugh Whittle of Horwich. He succeeded to the title on the death of his father in 1692.

== Life ==
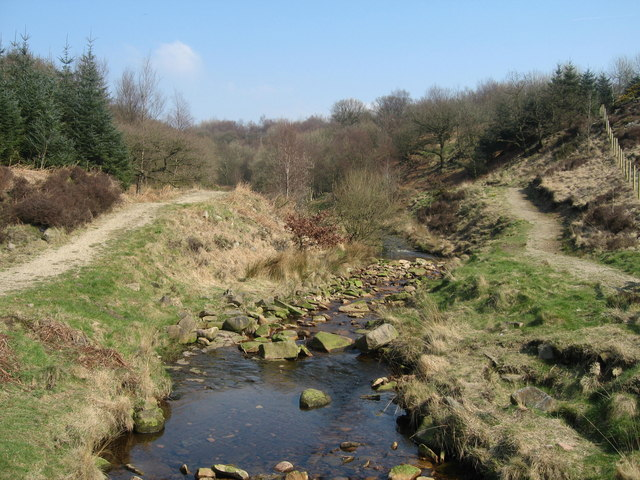
Lead Mines Clough, Anglezarke

Hugh Willoughby followed in his father's footsteps supporting religious dissenters at Rivington and Horwich. In 1693 he bought the Shaw family lease of lead mines at Anglezarke which he held along with the manor as trustee to a mortgage. In 1703 became a trustee and benefactor of Rivington Unitarian Chapel.

Hugh Willoughby married twice, first Anne, daughter of Lawrence Halliwell of Tockholes on 29 December 1663 at St Mary the Virgin's Church, Deane who bore him a son, Thomas baptised there on 21 December 1664, he died in infancy, Anne his wife died in 1690 aged 52. He then married Honora, daughter of Sir Thomas Leigh, Lord of Stoneleigh and had two children, John and Honora. His second wife outlived him and died 1750 aged 77. Hugh Willoughby died aged 75 without a surviving male heir in August 1712. The title passed to his nephew, Edward Willoughby who became 13th Baron Willoughby of Parham.

Peerage of England
Preceded by Thomas Willoughby	Baron Willoughby of Parham; 1692–1712	Succeeded by Edward Willoughby
