= Edward Willoughby, 13th Baron Willoughby of Parham =

English peer (1676–1713)

Edward Willoughby, 13th Baron Willoughby of Parham (1676–1713) was an English peer of the House of Lords. He was the son of Francis Willoughby (1676–1704) and Eleanor, daughter of Thomas Rothwell of Haigh. Francis was the younger brother of Hugh Willoughby, 12th Baron Willoughby of Parham who died without a male heir. Edward Willoughby was in military service with the Duke of Marlborough's regiment in Flanders when he died, unmarried, aged 37 in 1713. The administration of his estate was granted to a creditor, his mother and brother having renounced.

Peerage of England
| Preceded by Hugh Willoughby | Baron Willoughby of Parham; 1712–1713 | Succeeded by Charles Willoughby |
