= George Willoughby =

George Willoughby may refer to:

- George Willoughby (activist) (1914–2010), American Quaker activist
- Sir George Willoughby (MP) (c. 1635–1695), English MP for Marlborough, 1685–1695
- George Willoughby, 7th Baron Willoughby of Parham (1638–1674), English peer
- George Willoughby, 17th Baron Willoughby of Parham (1748/9–1779), English peer
- George Willoughby (East India Company officer) (1828–1857), British soldier in India
- George Willoughby (theatre entrepreneur) (1869–1951), English theatre entrepreneur
- George Willoughby (producer), Norwegian film producer
