= William Willoughby =

William Willoughby may refer to:

- William Willoughby, 11th Baron Willoughby de Eresby (1482–1526), father of Katherine Willoughby and the largest landowner in Lincolnshire, England
- William Willoughby, 1st Baron Willoughby of Parham (c. 1515–1570), English baron and nephew of the above
- William Willoughby (c.1566-1615), MP for Nottingham
- William Willoughby, 3rd Baron Willoughby of Parham (1584–1617), English peer
- William Willoughby, 6th Baron Willoughby of Parham (c. 1616–1673), English landowner and politician
- William Willoughby, 5th Baron Willoughby de Eresby (c. 1370–1409), English baron
- William Arnson Willoughby (1844–1908), Ontario physician and political figure
- William F. Willoughby (1867–1960), author of public administration texts
- Bill Willoughby (born 1957), American former basketball player

== See also ==
- William Willoughby Cole, 1st Earl of Enniskillen (1736–1803)
