= Henry Willoughby =

Henry Willoughby may refer to:

- Sir Henry Willoughby (courtier) (1451–1528), English courtier
- Henry Willobie (c. 1575–c. 1596), or Willoughby, English author
- Sir Henry Willoughby, 1st Baronet (1579–1649), see Willoughby baronets
- Henry Willoughby, 4th Baron Willoughby of Parham (1612–1617), English peer
- Henry Willoughby (colonial administrator) (1640–1669), British governor of Antigua and Barbados
- Henry Willoughby, 16th Baron Willoughby of Parham (1696–1775), English peer
- Henry Willoughby, 5th Baron Middleton (1726–1800), English peer
- Henry Willoughby, 6th Baron Middleton (1761–1835), English peer, son of the above
- Henry Willoughby (Newark MP) (1780–1849), member of Parliament for Newark
- Sir Henry Willoughby, 3rd Baronet (1796–1865), British politician
- Henry Willoughby, 8th Baron Middleton (1817–1877), English peer
