= Hugh Willoughby, 15th Baron Willoughby of Parham =

English nobleman

Hugh Willoughby 15th Baron Willoughby of Parham
- Baron Willoughby of Parham
- Tenure: 1715–1765
- Predecessor: Charles Willoughby
- Successor: Henry Willoughby
- Born: 1713
- Died: 17 January 1765 (aged 51–52); London
- Buried: Horwich Parish Church
- Parents: Charles Willoughby, 14th Baron Willoughby of Parham and Hester Devonport

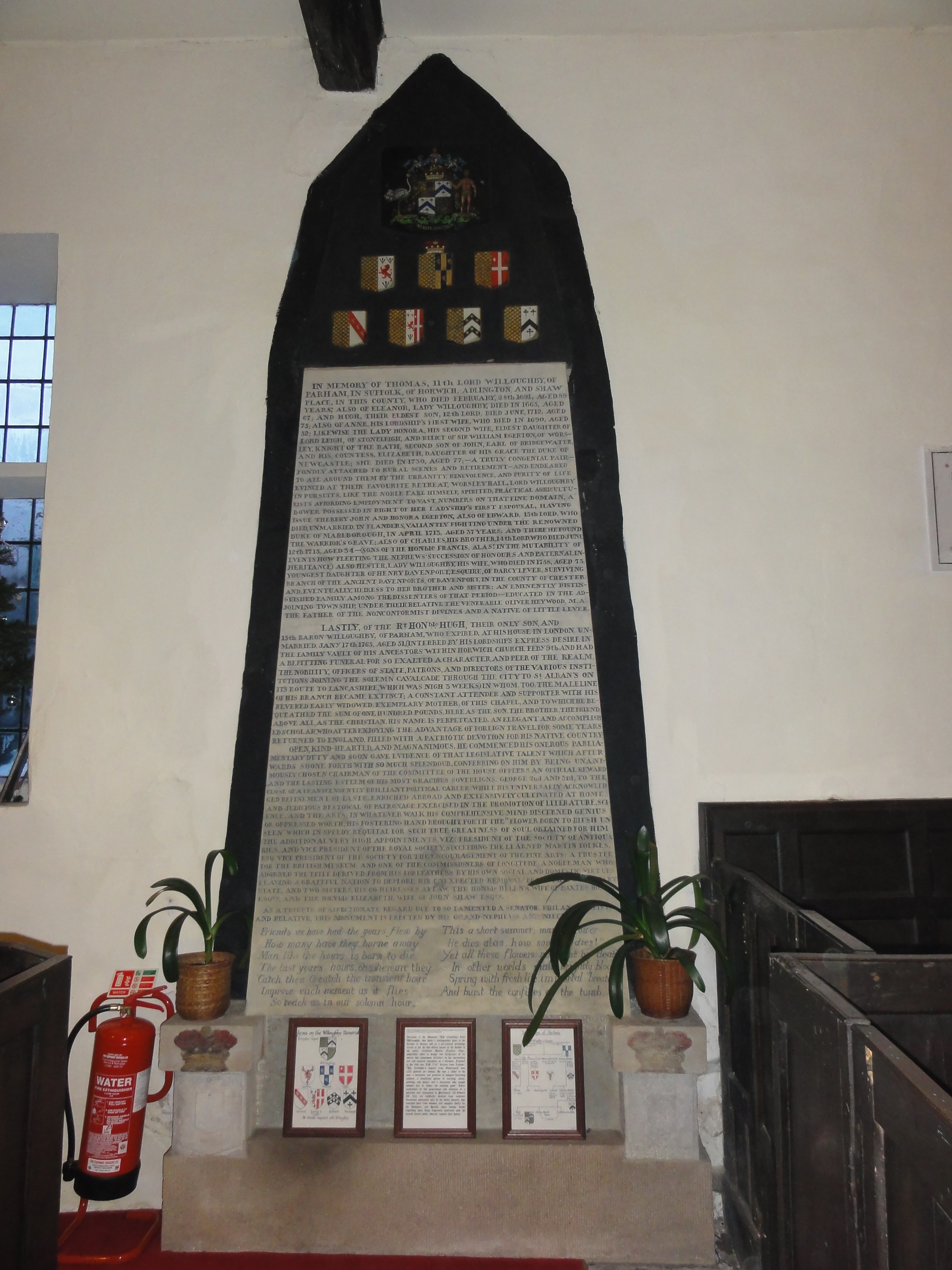
Monument to Barons Willoughby of Parham, Rivington Unitarian Chapel

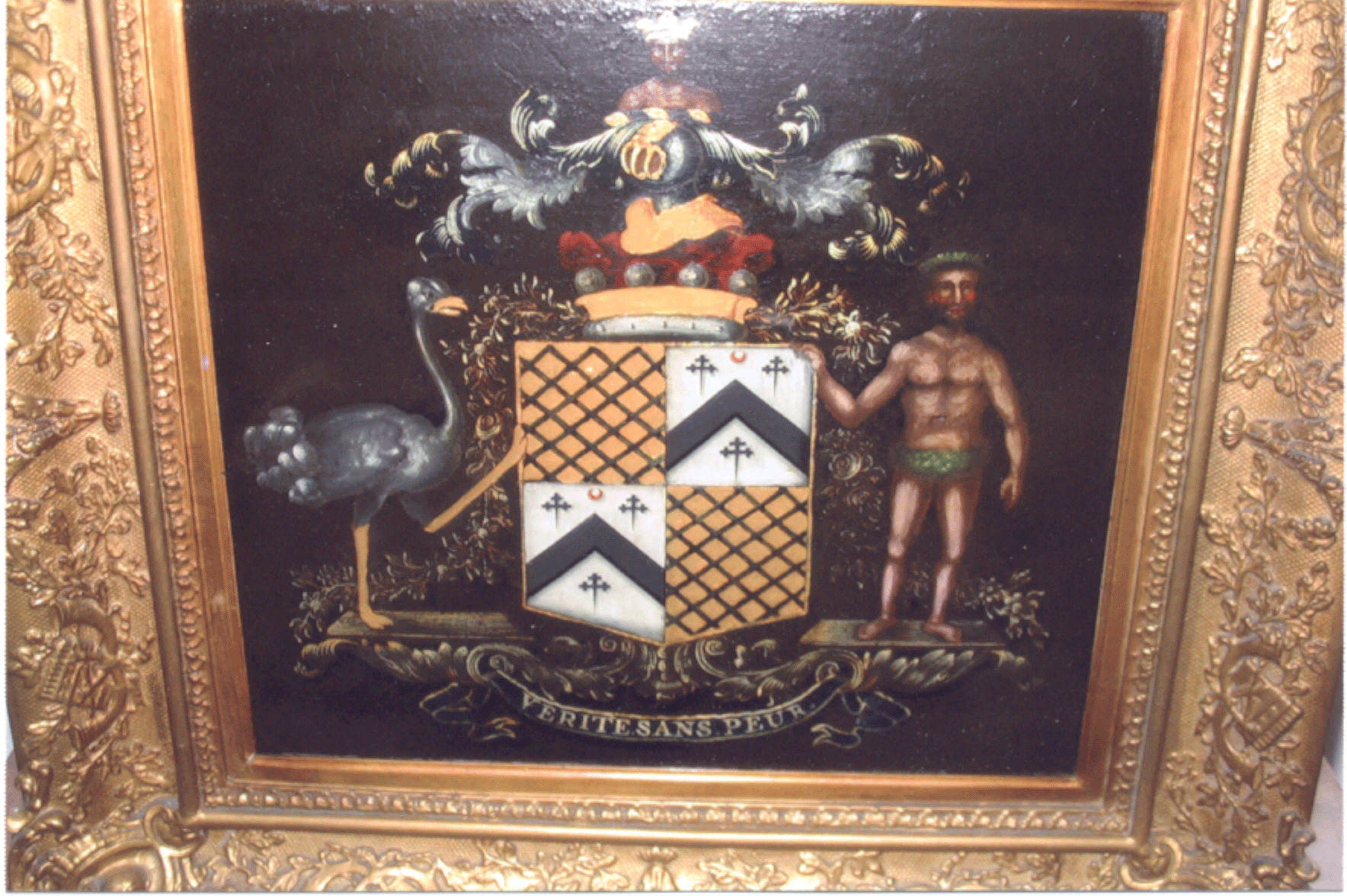
Coat of Arms of 15th Baron

Hugh, 15th Baron Willoughby of Parham FSA (1713 – 17 January 1765) was an English nobleman and hereditary peer of the House of Lords. He was born in 1713, the eldest son of Charles Willoughby, 14th Baron Willoughby of Parham and Hester, daughter of Henry Davenport of Little Lever and Darcy Lever, near Bolton. Hugh Willoughby's father died on 12 June 1715, aged 34, and the infant Hugh Willoughby became the 15th Baron Willoughby of Parham. He could not take his seat in the House of Lords until he reached the age of 21.

== Life ==
Hugh Willoughby was born in Lancashire around 1711, he resided at Shaw Place Health Charnock. After his father's death Hugh Willoughby was placed under the joint guardianship of his mother and Reverend John Walker, the Presbyterian minister of Horwich chapel of ease. His mother, Hester Willoughby married James Walton of Wigan in 1717, soon after the death of her first husband, and under the terms of his will, forfeited joint guardianship. On his father's death, Hugh Willoughby was below the age of majority and was placed under the guardianship of Rev. John Walker, a Presbyterian minister. His mother, Ester daughter of Henry Davenport of Little Lever and Darcy Lever, Bolton had remarried to James Walton of Wigan in 1716, soon after the death of Charles Willoughby, 14th Baron Willoughby of Parham her late husband. Under the terms of her late husband's will, she forfeited joint guardianship. In 1717 Hugh Willoughby commenced school at Rivington Grammar School then a newly rebuilt school erected in 1714. The school was governed by local non-conformists. Hugh Willoughby in his early years attended the Rivington Unitarian Chapel. In this period Rivington Grammar school was having difficulty finding a non-conformist headmaster and it is believed this led to Hugh Willoughby being transferred to a Non-conformist school at Taunton, Somerset where he met a lifelong friend Israel Mauduit, the political pamphleteer. In 1732 he received the freedom of Dumfries in Scotland. His half-brother John Walton attended Glasgow University in 1736 and during the adult life of Hugh Willoughby all the Ministers at the Rivington Unitarian Chapel were from that university. His mother Ester Walton was interred at Horwich Parish Church on 16 Jan 1761.

== Succession ==
In 1733, Hugh Willoughby was challenged by a rival claimant to the peerage, Henry Willoughby, a descendant of Sir Ambrose Willoughby, and the case was referred to the Chief Justice of the King's Bench. Sir Philip York (later Lord Hardwicke) championed Hugh Willoughby's cause.

As Henry Willoughby awaited his hearing, Hugh Willoughby spent his time travelling in Europe, his absence prevented the case being heard. However, on his return the case from Henry Willoughby was still not attended to by Hugh Willoughby or the attorney general.

Hugh Willoughby gained a writ of summons to the House of Lords and took his seat on 1 February 1734, despite a caveat: his rival's petition was read to the house.

== House of Lords ==
In his first year, he attended the Lords without missing a session. In the years 1735 to 1739, he was noted for his non-attendance, then after 1742 attended without fail. In addition to his duties in the Lords he was elected vice-president of the Royal Society in 1752 and president of the Society of Antiquaries in 1754. Other positions included vice-president of the Society for the Encouragement of Fine Arts, trustee for the British Museum and a commissioner on the Board of Longitude. From 1758 until 1762 he was governor at Rivington Grammar School and was a trustee of Blackrod Grammar School from 1736 although he did not attend meetings. He aided the foundation of the Warrington Academy.

Hugh Willoughby chaired a committee of the House of Lords a year after taking his seat. Philip Yorke wrote that Willoughby was "eminently useful in the dispatch of the ordinary business" of the Lords, and "had a thorough and accurate knowledge of the forms and usage of Parliament". He played a significant role in committee work between 1739–40. In 1758, with twenty years' continuous experience, he took over the position of Chairman of Committees of the House of Lords on a temporary basis following the illness of the 8th Earl of Warwick. By 12 November 1759, he was the permanent Chairman of Committees, a position he held until his death. During his lifetime he had served 58 times as Chair of Committees and served on 227 select committees.

In 1744 he was elected a Fellow of the Royal Society and served as their vice-president on two occasions.

== Death ==
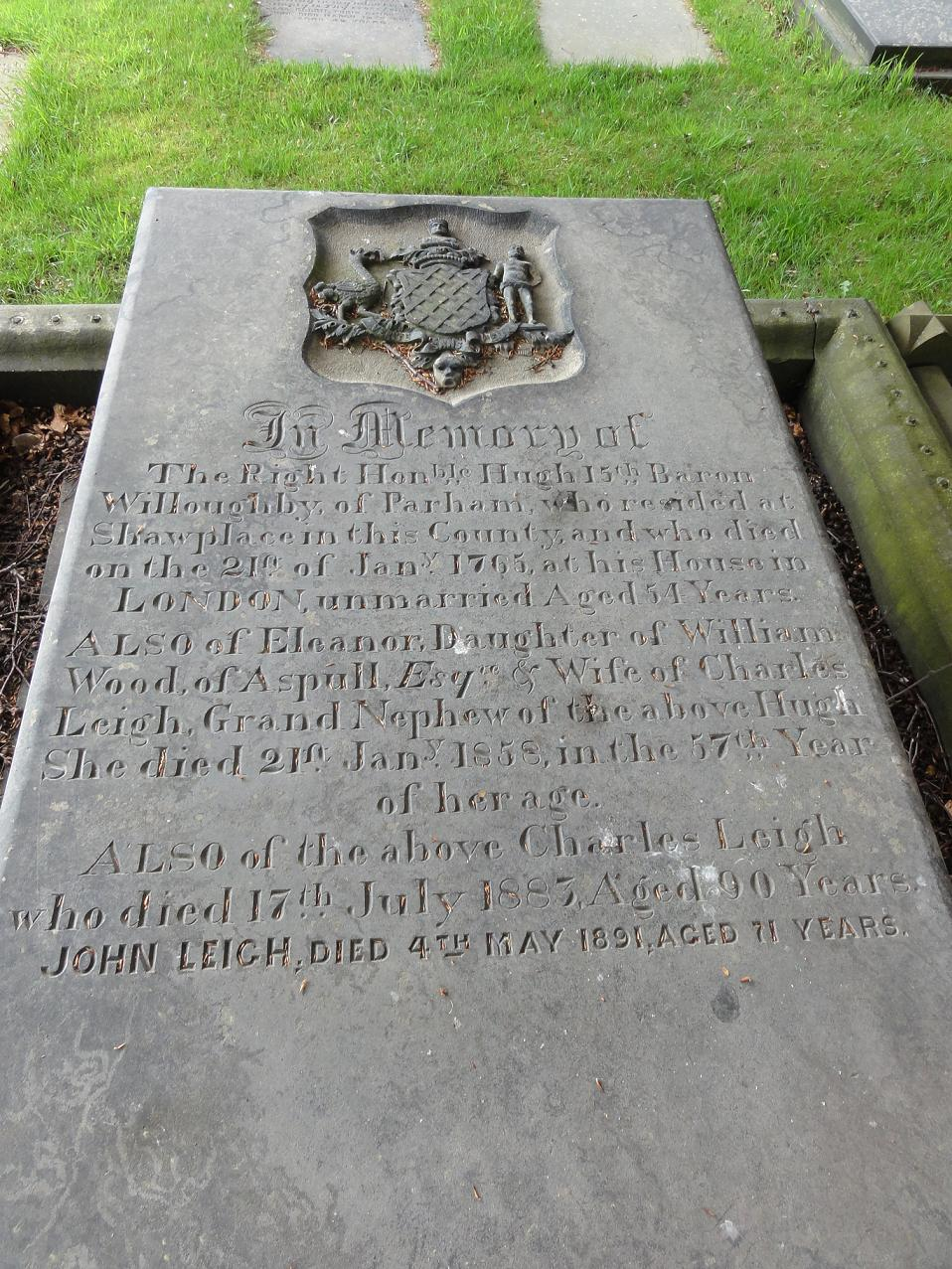
Monumental Inscription of 15th Lord Willoughby of Parham, Horwich Parish Church

Hugh Willoughby died without issue on 22 January 1765 in London. Though a prominent dissenter, he was buried in the chancel of an earlier Horwich Church on 9 February 1765, the Church was rebuilt further away from the road in 1830, his grave is now within the current Parish Church graveyard . He left his distant cousin, Henry Willoughby, heir to the barony, and property in Rivington and Anglezarke to his sisters, Helen Roscoe and Elizabeth Shaw. In memory of the family there is a monument at Rivington Unitarian Chapel. The Willoughby pew, bearing its original brass nameplate on the south wall of the chapel has been preserved and is noted for its large ornate canopy with panelled reredos and a moulded and carved cornice in the classical style.

Peerage of England
Preceded by Charles Willoughby	Baron Willoughby of Parham; 1715–1765	Succeeded by Henry Willoughby
