= Charles Willoughby, 10th Baron Willoughby of Parham =

English peer

Charles Willoughby, 10th Baron Willoughby of Parham was an English peer of the House of Lords.

He succeeded to the title in September 1678 on the death of John Willoughby, 9th Baron Willoughby of Parham. Charles Willoughy was the male heir and descendant from the first creation of the barony that commenced with Sir William Willoughby 1st Baron Willoughby of Parham in 1547 and was the last male heir of the eldest line. Charles Willoughby married Marie daughter of Sir Beaumont Dixie, Bart of Bosworth. He died without a male heir on 9 December 1679. The first creation by letters patent stipulated the title must pass to heirs male of Sir William Willoughby 1st Baron Willoughby of Parham.

Charles Willoughby, 10th Baron Willoughby of Parham died without issue and left his estate to his niece Elizabeth, who had married James Bertie, 1st Earl of Abingdon.

== Second Creation ==
On the death of the 10th Lord Willoughby, the title should have passed to the line of the next son of Charles 2nd Lord Willoughby, who was Sir Ambrose Willoughby, and then through his line to the eldest son, Edward Willoughby, and then Henry; however the family had emigrated to Virginia and it was believed that this male line was extinct. The title passed instead through the line of Thomas the youngest son of Charles Willoughby, 2nd Baron Willoughby of Parham and his sons to Thomas Willoughby, who had married Eleanor Whittle, daughter of Hugh Whittle, a staunch Presbyterian yeoman of Horwich, Lancashire, England. The Writ of Summons by the monarch to the hereditary peerage in parliament of the successor created a second Barony of Parham in fee and inheritable by his heirs general.

Peerage of England
Preceded by John Willoughby	Baron Willoughby of Parham; 1678–1679	Succeeded by Thomas Willoughby
