= Henry Willoughby, 16th Baron Willoughby of Parham =

English peer

Henry Willoughby, 16th Baron Willoughby of Parham (1696 – 29 January 1775) was an English peer of the House of Lords.

On the death of Charles Willoughby, 10th Baron Willoughby of Parham, who died without male heir on 9 December 1679, the title should have passed to the descendants of Sir Ambrose Willoughby of Matson, second son of Charles Willoughby, 2nd Baron Willoughby of Parham who died in 1603. The title instead had passed to the nephew of Sir Ambrose, Thomas Willoughby, who became the 11th baron. Sir Ambrose Willoughby had two sons, Edward and Richard. Edward's son was Henry, who emigrated to the Colony of Virginia in 1676, whose whereabouts were unknown. Henry died in Hull Creek, Virginia on 26 November 1685, aged 59. His son, also Henry, was then aged 20. Henry married Elizabeth, daughter of William Pigeon of Stepney, with whom he had a son who was also named Henry.

Henry Willoughby had twice been master of the Company of Brewers in London, a Justice of the Peace and colonel of the 2nd Regiment of Militia of the Tower Hamlets. Henry Willoughby married Susannah, daughter Robert Gresswell of Middlesex and had a daughter, Elizabeth who married John Halsey of Tower Hill.

Henry Willoughby first petitioned for his seat in the House of Lords in 1733, his case was not heard. His petition was accepted after the death of Hugh Willoughby, 15th Baron Willoughby of Parham and he took his seat on 25 April 1767 to become the 16th baron. Henry Willoughby died on 29 January 1775, aged 79, without male heir and the title passed to his nephew.

== Notes ==
- The Records of a Lancashire Family - Shaw, 1940
- Burke John, A General and Heraldic Dictionary of the Peerage of England, Ireland and Scotland 1831.

Peerage of England
Preceded by Hugh Willoughby	Baron Willoughby of Parham; 1767–1775	Succeeded by George Willoughby
