= Francis Willoughby =

Francis Willoughby may refer to:

- Francis Willoughby (1547–1596), industrialist and coalowner
- Francis Willoughby (1613–1671), deputy governor of Massachusetts
- Francis Willughby (1635–1672), English ornithologist and ichthyologist
- Francis Willoughby, 2nd Baron Middleton (1692–1758), Old Etonian
- Francis Willoughby, 3rd Baron Middleton (1726–1774), English nobleman
- Francis Willoughby, 5th Baron Willoughby of Parham (1605–1666), Barbadian politician
