= Charles Willoughby, 14th Baron Willoughby of Parham =

Peer in the House of Lords

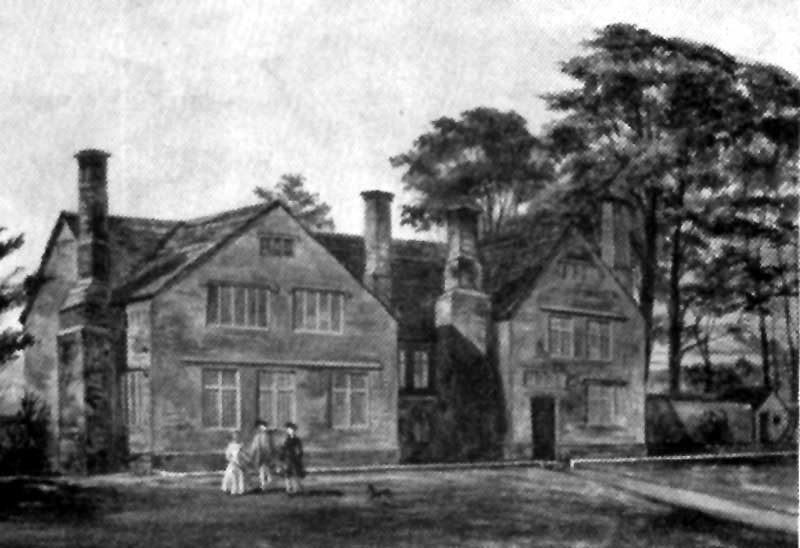
Shaw Place, Heath Charnock, Lancashire, c.1770

Charles Willoughby, 14th Baron Willoughby of Parham (25 December 1681 – 17 July 1715) was an English peer of the House of Lords. He married Hester Davenport, daughter of Henry Davenport of Darcy Lever, at St Peters Bolton on 18 Oct 1705. He resided at Horwich, and his son Hugh was interred on 21 December 1707 at Holy Trinity Chapel, Horwich. He had a surviving son also named Hugh and two daughters, Helena who married Baxter Roscoe of Anglezarke and Elizabeth who married John Shaw of Anglezarke. As he was in poor health he never moved to his inherited Lancashire seat of Shaw Place. He died aged 34. His wife, Hester, outlived him and died aged 73 in 1758.

== Notes ==
- The Records of a Lancashire Family - Shaw, 1940
- Burke John, A General and Heraldic Dictionary of the Peerage of England, Ireland and Scotland 1831.

Peerage of England
Preceded by Edward Willoughby	Baron Willoughby of Parham; 1713–1715	Succeeded by Hugh Willoughby
