= John Willoughby (disambiguation) =

John Willoughby is a character in Jane Austen's Sense and Sensibility

John Willoughby is also the name of:

- John Willoughby (1421–1477), English soldier and politician
- John Willoughby, 9th Baron Willoughby of Parham (1643–1678), English peer of the House of Lords
- John Willoughby, 8th Baron Willoughby of Parham (1669–1678), English peer of the House of Lords
- Sir John Willoughby, 4th Baronet (1799–1866), British Member of Parliament for Leominster
- Sir John Christopher Willoughby, 5th Baronet (1859–1918), Willoughby baronet, British army officer, Justice of the Peace
- John Henry Charles Willoughby (1861–1940), Canadian physician and politician in Saskatchewan
- John Willoughby (British Army officer) (1913–1991), British general

== See also ==
- Joan Willoughby, 7th Baroness Willoughby de Eresby
