= William FitzRoy, 3rd Duke of Cleveland =

English nobleman (1698-1774)

William FitzRoy, 3rd Duke of Cleveland, 2nd Duke of Southampton (19 February 1698 – 18 May 1774) was an English nobleman, styled Earl of Chichester from birth until 1730, then he succeeded his father Charles FitzRoy as Duke of Southampton, Duke of Cleveland and Chief Butler of England. His father was the third illegitimate sons of King Charles II and Barbara Villiers, 1st Duchess of Cleveland.

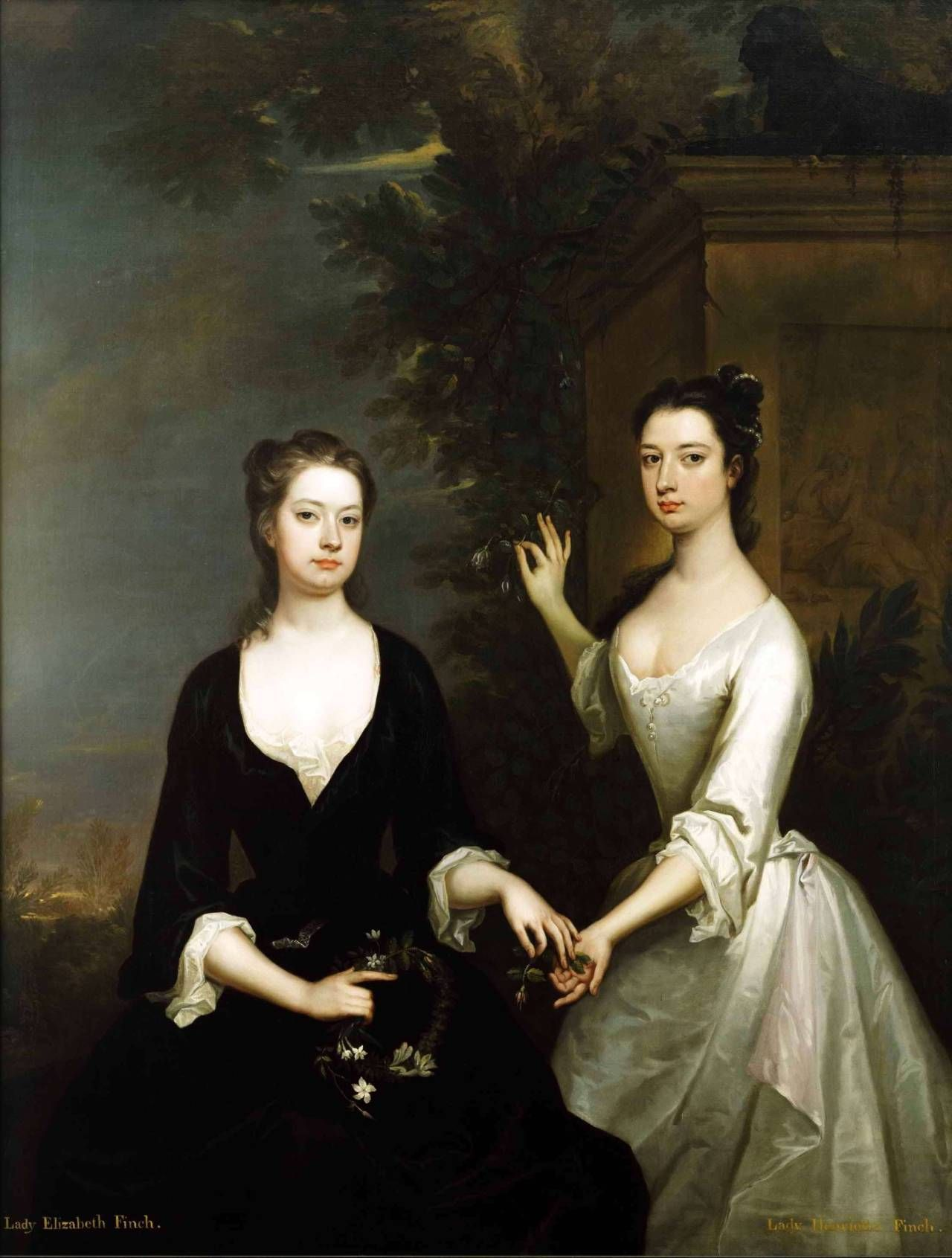
Lady Elizabeth (later Countess of Mansfield) and Lady Henrietta Finch, Duchess of Cleveland.

In 1731, he married Lady Henrietta Finch, the daughter of Daniel Finch, 2nd Earl of Nottingham. She died in 1742, without having left him children. He thereafter lived a retired life, enjoying his sinecures of Receiver-General of the Profits of the Seals in the King's Bench and Common Pleas, and Comptroller of the Seal and Green Wax Offices. The dukedoms and subsidiary titles became extinct upon his death. The Cleveland dukedom was subsequently recreated for his grand-nephew William Vane, 1st Duke of Cleveland.

Peerage of England
Preceded by Charles FitzRoy	Duke of Cleveland; 1730–1774	Extinct
Preceded by Charles FitzRoy	Duke of Southampton; 1730–1774	Extinct
