= Viscount Montagu =

Title in the Peerage of England

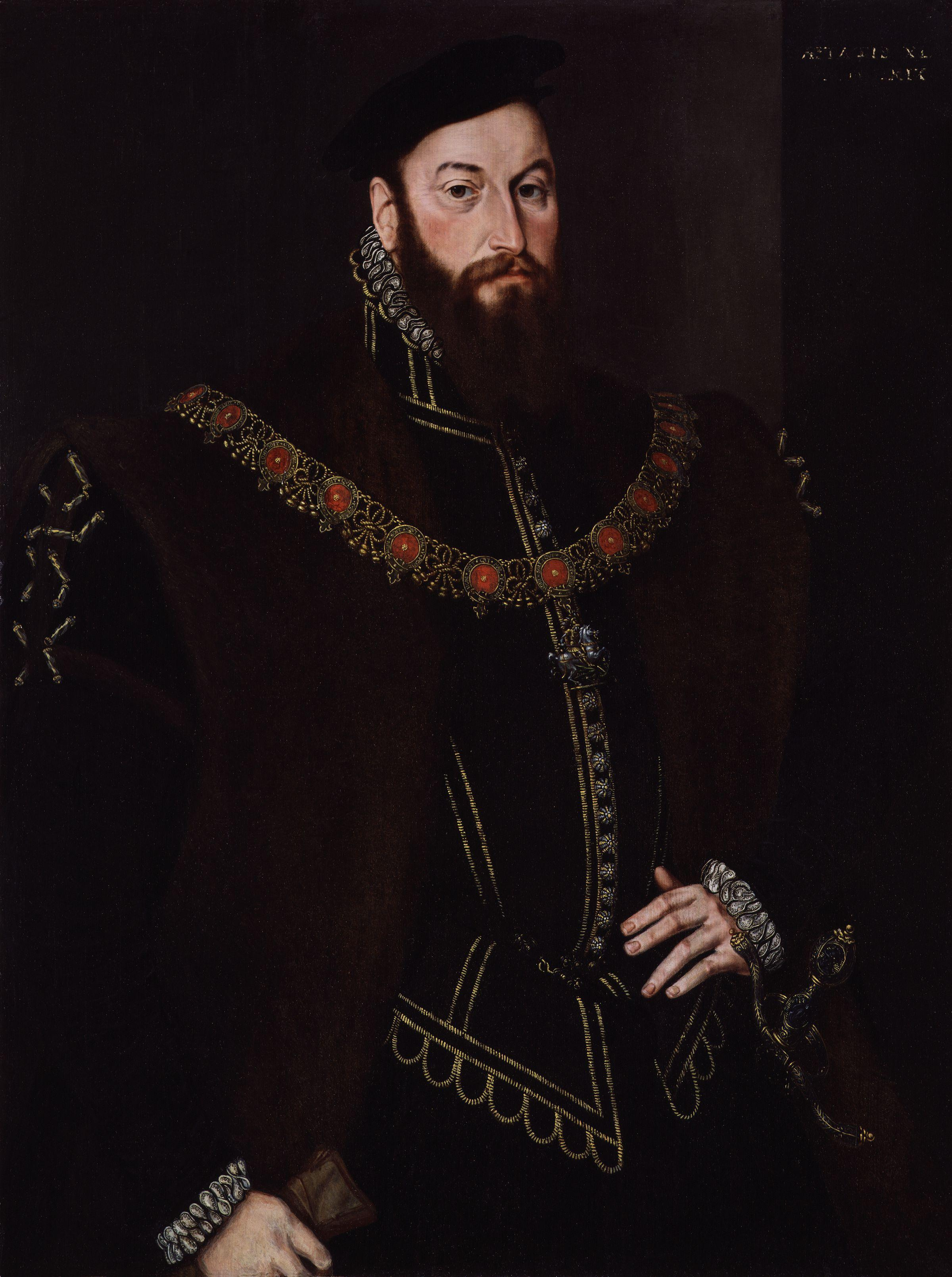
A 1569 portrait of Anthony Browne, 1st Viscount Montagu by Hans Eworth.

Viscount Montagu was a title in the Peerage of England. It was created on 2 September 1554 for Anthony Browne of the Noble House of Montagu. It became extinct on the death of the ninth Viscount in 1797. The title Viscount Montagu was chosen from line of descent from John Neville, 1st Marquess of Montagu. His daughter, Lucy Neville, was the grandmother of Anthony Browne. He was made a Viscount to correlate to the wealth of the Browne family. Cowdray House became the established seat of the Viscounts Montagu.

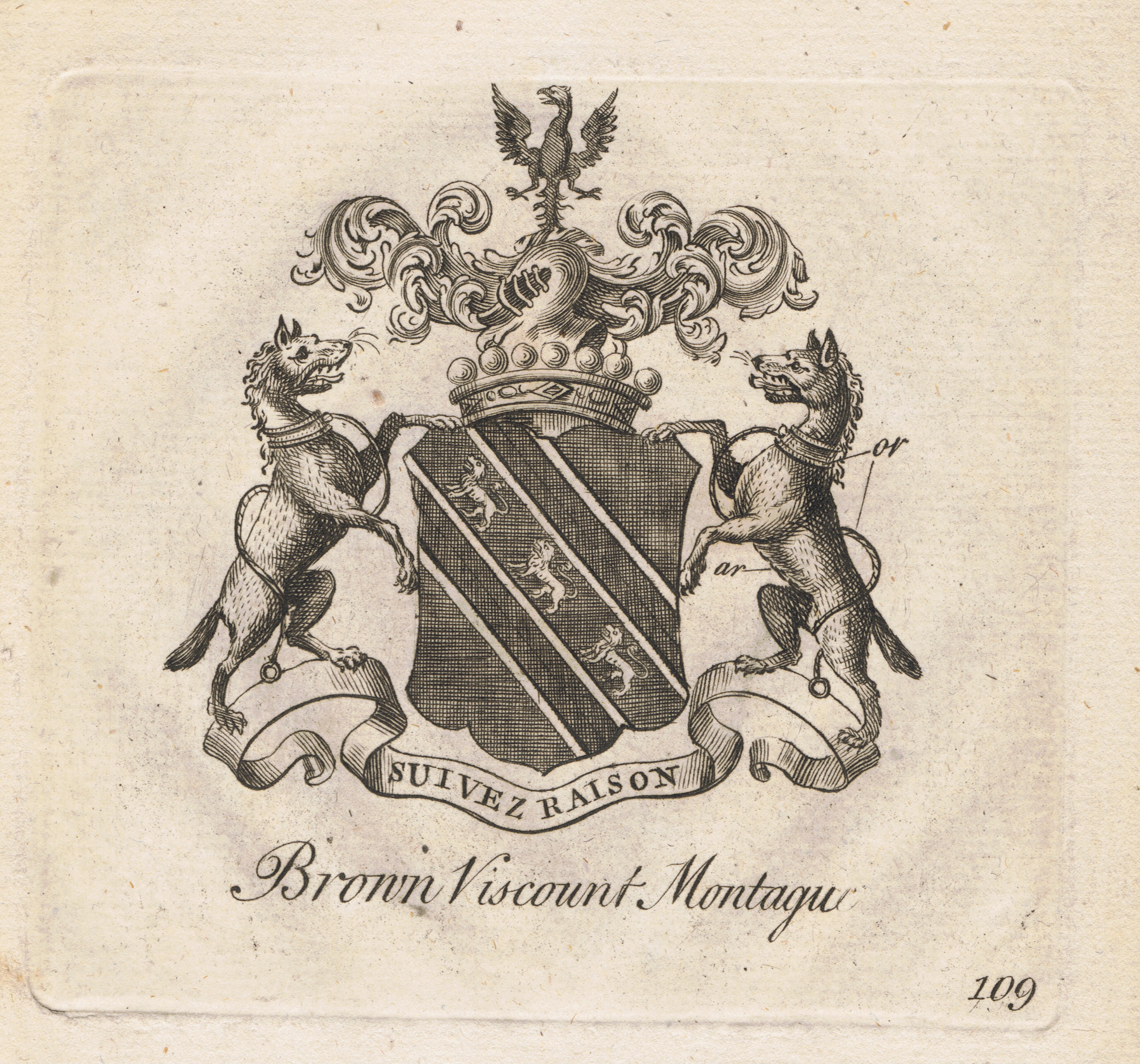
Coat of arms of the Browne, Viscounts Montagu.

== Viscounts Montagu (1554) ==
- Anthony Browne, 1st Viscount Montagu (1528–1592)
- Anthony-Maria Browne, 2nd Viscount Montagu (1574–1629)
- Francis Browne, 3rd Viscount Montagu (1610–1682)
- Francis Browne, 4th Viscount Montagu (1638–1708)
- Henry Browne, 5th Viscount Montagu (c. 1640–1717)
- Anthony Browne, 6th Viscount Montagu (1686–1767)
- Anthony Browne, 7th Viscount Montagu (1728–1787)
- George Browne, 8th Viscount Montagu (1769–1793)
- Mark Browne, 9th Viscount Montagu (1745–1797)

== See also ==
- Browne baronets
