= George Willoughby, 17th Baron Willoughby of Parham =

George Willoughby, 17th Baron Willoughby of Parham (c.1748/49 – 1779) was an English peer of the House of Lords.

He was born on 24 April 1748 (or 1749), the son of Fortune Willoughby and Hannah, former wife of Cook Tollet and daughter of Thomas Barrow. On the death of his uncle Henry in 1775, he succeeded as the 17th Baron Willoughby of Parham. Four years later, he died without issue on 29 October 1779 and the barony became extinct.

== Bibliography ==
- Burke, John (1831), A General and Heraldic Dictionary of the Peerage of England, Ireland and Scotland, London: Henry Colburn and Richard Bentley.

Peerage of England
Preceded by Henry Willoughby	Baron Willoughby of Parham; 1775–1779	Extinct
