= Anthony Browne, 7th Viscount Montagu =

English peer and landowner

Anthony Joseph Browne, 7th Viscount Montagu (1728 – 9 April 1787) was an English peer and landowner.

He was the son of Anthony Browne, 6th Viscount Montagu, by his marriage to Barbara Webb.

On 22 July 1765, at St George's, Hanover Square, Montagu married Frances Falconer, daughter of Herbert Mackworth and the widow of Alexander Falconer, 6th Lord Falconer of Halkerton, and they were the parents of George Browne, 8th Viscount Montagu, and Elizabeth Mary Browne.

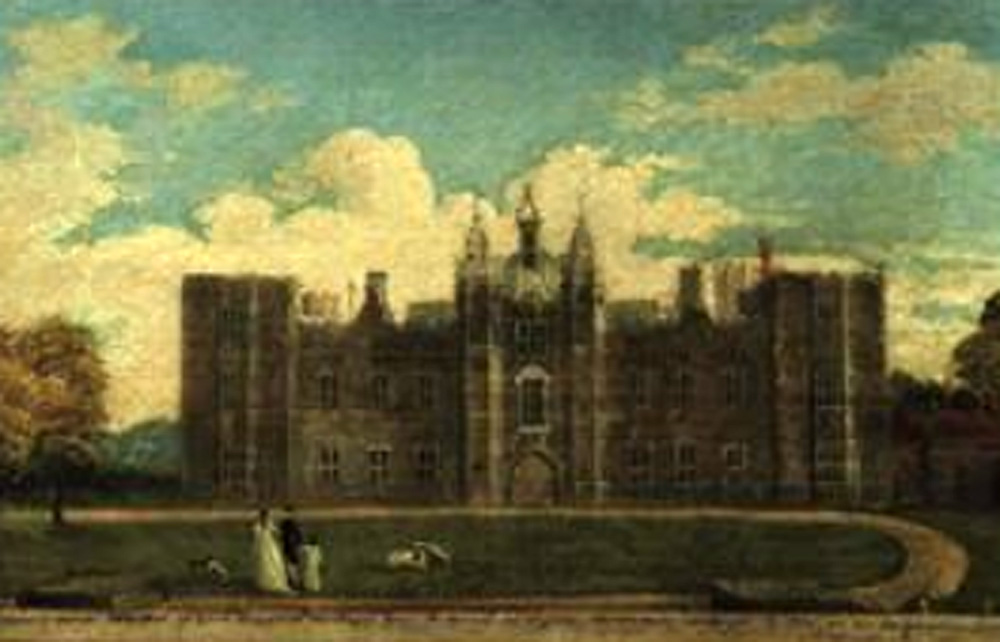
Cowdray House about 1790

In 1770, Montagu employed Capability Brown to improve the gardens of his principal seat, Cowdray House.

Montagu died in 1787. In 1800, his widow married Henry Slaughter M.D. at St George's, Hanover Square, her third wedding in that church, and lived until 1823.

Peerage of England
Preceded by Anthony Browne	Viscount Montagu; 1787–1793	Succeeded by George Browne
