= William Willoughby, 1st Baron Willoughby of Parham =

English nobleman and soldier

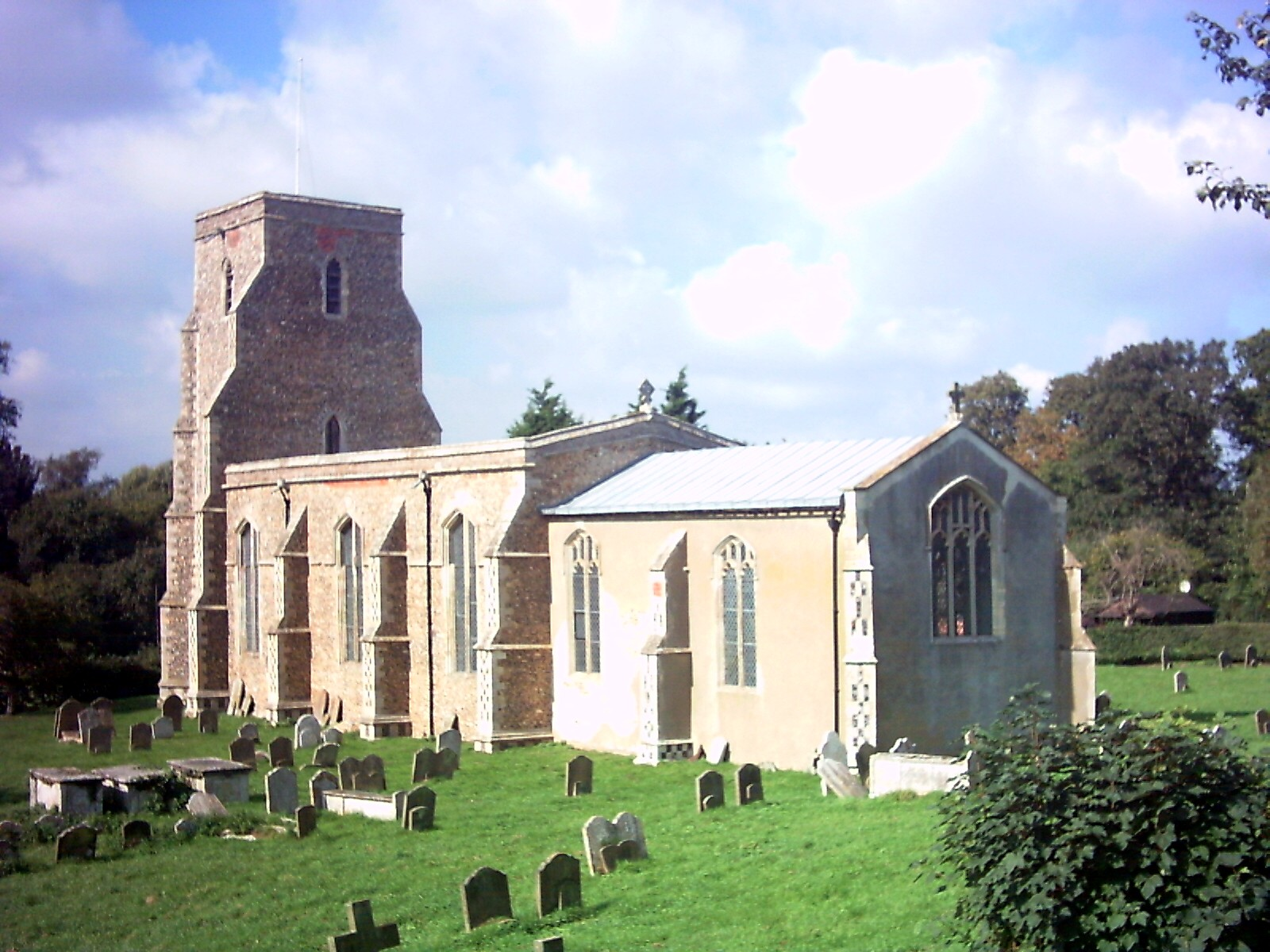
- Church of St Mary, Parham, Suffolk
- Born: c.1515
- Died: 30 July 1570
- Spouses: Elizabeth Heneage; Margaret Garneys
- Issue: Charles Willoughby, 2nd Baron Willoughby of Parham
- Father: Sir Christopher Willoughby; Mary Willoughby
- Mother: Elizabeth Tailboys

William Willoughby, 1st Baron Willoughby of Parham (c.1515 – 30 July 1570) was an English nobleman and soldier who in 1547 was made an hereditary peer of the House of Lords.

== Family ==
William Willoughby was the son of Sir Christopher Willoughby of Parham, Suffolk, and Elizabeth Tailboys, daughter of Sir George Tailboys, de jure 9th Baron Kyme. His father, Sir Christopher Willoughby, was a younger brother of William Willoughby, 11th Baron Willoughby de Eresby, who died without male issue in 1526, leaving a daughter, Katherine. The 11th Baron had settled lands on his brother, Sir Christopher, at his marriage with Elizabeth Tailboys, but had died before the lands had been transferred, resulting in a dispute which was ultimately settled by an Act of Parliament which divided the lands between Sir Christopher and his niece, Katherine, who had married Charles Brandon, 1st Duke of Suffolk.

William Willoughby's father was the second son of Sir Christopher Willoughby (c.1453 – 1498/9) of Parham, de jure 10th Baron Willoughby, by Margaret Jenney (d.1515/16), the daughter of Sir William Jenney.

== Career ==
According to Bindoff, he was almost certainly the William Willoughby who in 1536 was in service with King Henry VIII's illegitimate son, Henry Fitzroy, as William Willoughby's uncle, Gilbert Tailboys, 1st Baron Tailboys of Kyme, had by then married Henry Fitzroy's mother, Elizabeth Blount.

Willoughby succeeded his father some time between July 1538 and October 1540, and was knighted in January 1542. He was elected to Parliament as knight of the shire (MP) for Lincolnshire in 1545. He was then raised to the peerage under letters patent on 16 February 1547, with the remainder to his heirs male of body. The creation of the barony gave the right to a hereditary peerage and seat in the House of Lords. From 1550 to 1552 he served as lord deputy of Calais and adjacent marches.

== Marriages and issue ==
Willoughby married firstly, by 1536, Elizabeth Heneage, the daughter and sole heir of Sir Thomas Heneage of Hainton, Lincolnshire, by Katherine Skipwith by whom he had a son, Charles Willoughby, 2nd Baron Willoughby of Parham and a daughter, Mary.

He married secondly, by settlement dated 20 August 1559, Margaret Garneys, widow of Walter Devereux, 1st Viscount Hereford (d. 17 September 1558), and daughter of Robert Garneys of Kenton, Suffolk, by Anne Bacon. By her first marriage Margaret had an only son, Sir Edward Devereux, 1st Baronet.

On his death on 30 July 1570 at Minting Park, Lincolnshire, he was interred at Parham Church, Suffolk, and was succeeded by his only son Charles. His second wife outlived him, being interred at Stowe Church, Chartley in 1599.

== Footnotes ==
Peerage of England
New creation	Baron Willoughby of Parham; 1547–1570	Succeeded by Charles Willoughby
