= Baron Willoughby of Parham =

Barony in the Peerage of England

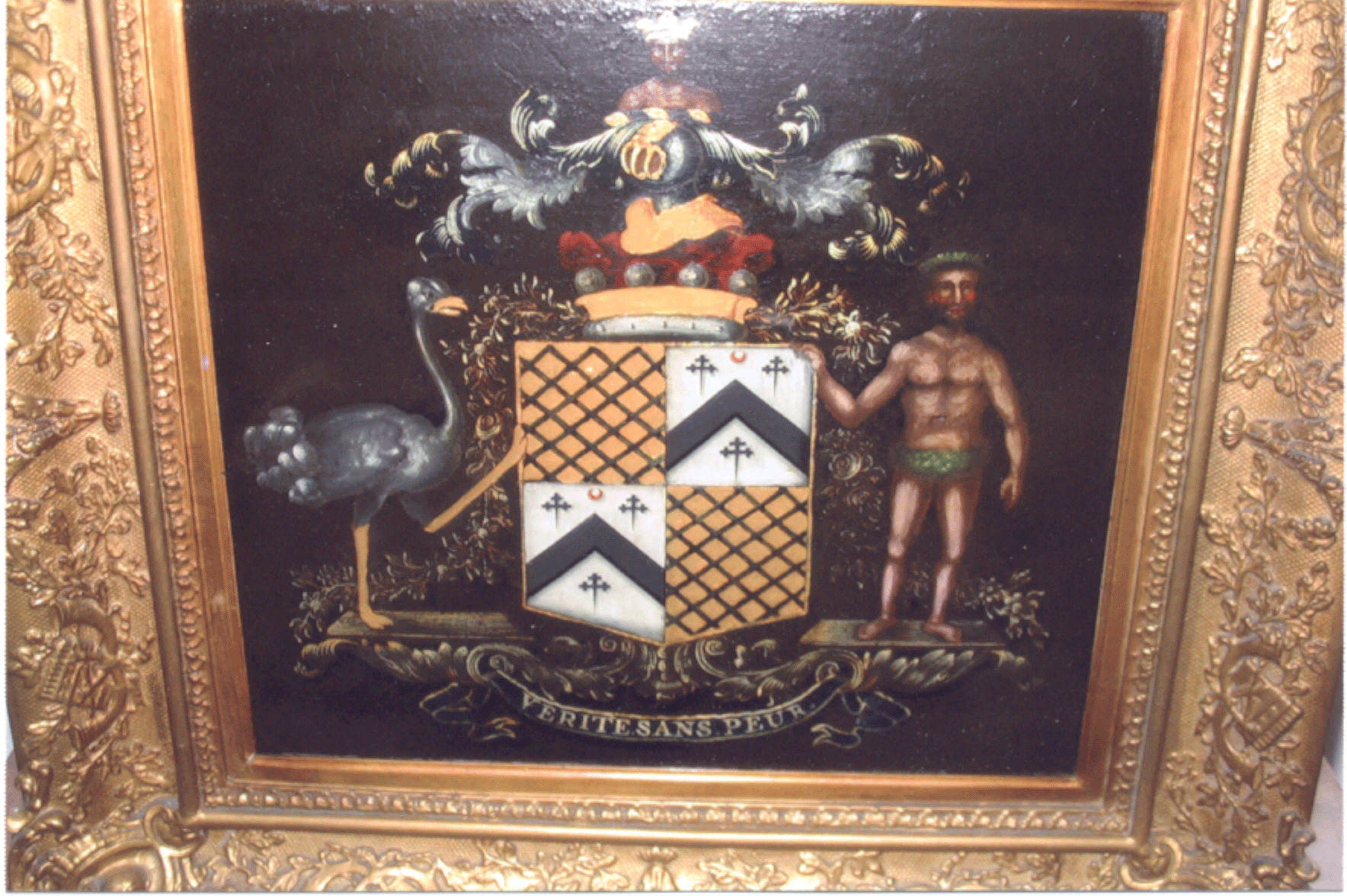
Shield of Arms of 15th Baron Willoughby of Parham

Baron Willoughby of Parham was a title in the Peerage of England with two creations. The first creation was for Sir William Willoughby who was raised to the peerage under letters patent in 1547, with the remainder to his heirs male of body. An error in identifying the heir in 1680 resulted in an inadvertent novel creation by writ in 1680, without the restriction on inheritance by gender. The creation of the barony gave the right to a hereditary peerage and seat in the House of Lords, the upper house of Parliament.

The barony was created on 20 February 1547 for Sir William Willoughby, a descendant of William Willoughby, 5th Baron Willoughby de Eresby living 1370 to 1409. From his son Charles Willoughby, 2nd Baron Willoughby of Parham, descended a senior male line that went extinct on the death of Charles Willoughby, 10th Baron Willoughby of Parham in 1679. At the time, the male line of Sir Ambroise Willoughby, the second son of the 2nd Baron, was wrongly thought to be extinct though Henry Willoughby, a grandson of Sir Ambrose, was still living in the Colony of Virginia. Thus, in 1680 a grandson of the 2nd Baron via his fifth son, Sir Thomas, was summoned to Parliament as Thomas Willoughby, 11th Baron Willoughby of Parham.

The title thus passed in this junior line of the family, but in 1733 while Hugh Willoughby, 15th Baron Willoughby of Parham was sitting in Parliament, Colonel Henry Willoughby, a grandson of the Virginia emigrant of Ambrose's line, put forward his claim with proofs of his right to the title. No action was taken at the time, but on the death of the 15th Baron in 1765, Colonel Willoughby renewed his claim, and it was formally recognized in 1767. This decision was based on the hereditary right of his as the senior line, and by implication meant that his father and grandfather had been the rightful Barons Willoughby of Parham before him. It likewise would mean that the summons to Thomas Willoughby as 11th Baron must by law be viewed as having represented the creation of a novel barony of the same name, without the male line restriction of the original grant and hence in abeyance between the two sisters of the last baron of the junior line.

The first creation of the Barony, 1547 is considered extinct as having no known male heir on the death of George Willoughby, 17th Baron Willoughby of Parham on 29 October 1779, though unidentified male heirs may still have existed.

== Parham, Suffolk ==
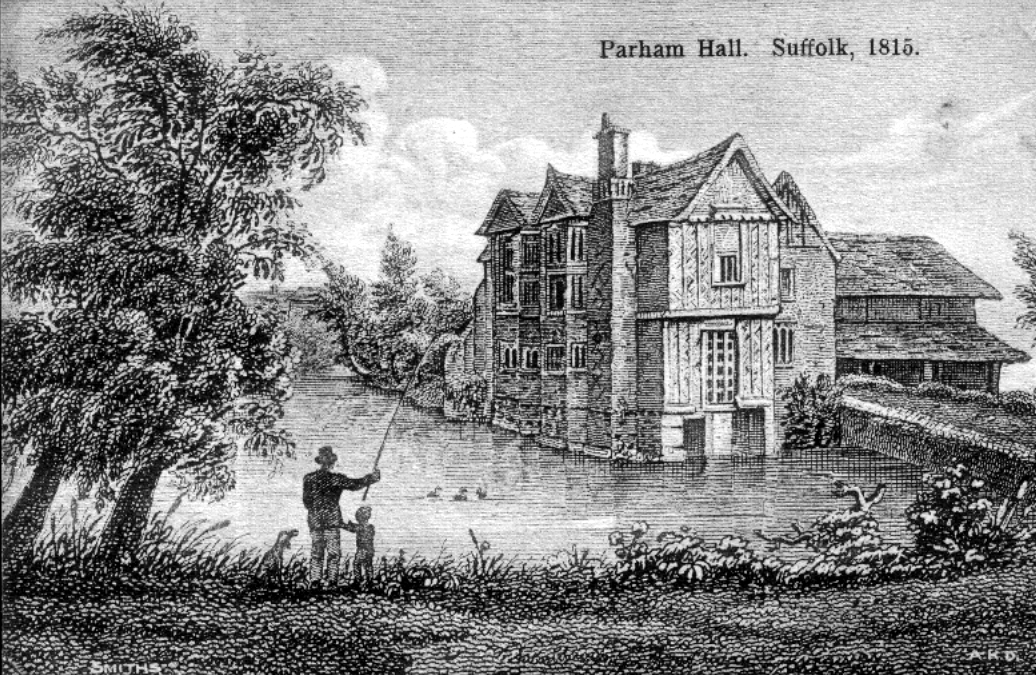
Parham Old Hall, Suffolk, 1815

Christopher, 10th Baron Willoughby de Eresby, married Margaret, daughter of Sir William Jenney, of Knottishall Knt, and gave the estate of Parham, Suffolk to his second son, Sir Christopher Willoughby who married Elizabeth, daughter of Sir George Talbois and it was their son William Willoughby who was created 1st Baron Willoughby of Parham and was Lieutenant of Calais. He married Elizabeth, daughter and co-heir of Sir Thomas Heneage. Their son was Charles, Lord Willoughby, who married Margaret, daughter of Edward Clinton, 1st Earl of Lincoln. Their male descendants continued to be titled Baron Willoughby of Parham until 1779.

Between 1680 and 1690, Parham Hall, formerly the property and residence of the Lords Willoughby of Parham, was purchased by the family of Corrance of Rendlesham.

== Barons Willoughby of Parham (1547) ==
- William Willoughby, 1st Baron Willoughby of Parham (c. 1515–1570)
- Charles Willoughby, 2nd Baron Willoughby of Parham (c. 1536/37–c. 1610/12)
- William Willoughby, 3rd Baron Willoughby of Parham (1584–1617)
- Henry Willoughby, 4th Baron Willoughby of Parham (c. 1612–1617)
- Francis Willoughby, 5th Baron Willoughby of Parham (1614–1666)
- William Willoughby, 6th Baron Willoughby of Parham (c. 1616–1673)
- George Willoughby, 7th Baron Willoughby of Parham (1638–1674)
- John Willoughby, 8th Baron Willoughby of Parham (1669–1678)
- John Willoughby, 9th Baron Willoughby of Parham (1643–1678)
- Charles Willoughby, 10th Baron Willoughby of Parham (1650–1679)

== Barons Willoughby of Parham (1680)(created in error) ==
- Thomas Willoughby, 11th Baron Willoughby of Parham (de jure 1st Baron of a new creation) (c. 1602–1691)
- Hugh Willoughby, 12th Baron Willoughby of Parham (de jure 2nd Baron of the 1680 creation) (1637–1712)
- Edward Willoughby, 13th Baron Willoughby of Parham (de jure 3rd Baron of the 1680 creation) (1676–1713)
- Charles Willoughby, 14th Baron Willoughby of Parham (de jure 4th Baron of the 1680 creation) (1681–1715)
- Hugh Willoughby, 15th Baron Willoughby of Parham (de jure 5th Baron of the 1680 creation) (c. 1713–1765)

== Barons Willoughby of Parham (1547; Reverted) ==
- Henry Willoughby, de jure 11th Baron Willoughby of Parham (1626-1685)
- Henry Willoughby, de jure 12th Baron Willoughby of Parham (1665-1722)
- Henry Willoughby, 16th Baron Willoughby of Parham (de jure 13th Baron) (1696–1775)
- George Willoughby, 17th Baron Willoughby of Parham (de jure 14th Baron) (c. 1748/49–1779)

== Family tree ==
This family tree includes only Barons Willoughby of Parham and their descendants who are relevant to the succession.

William Willoughby, 1st Baron (c. 1515–1570)
Charles Willoughby, 2nd Baron (c. 1536/37–c. 1610/12)
William Willoughby (died 1601)	Sir Ambrose Willoughby (died 1608)	Sir Thomas; Willoughby
William Willoughby, 3rd Baron (1584–1617)	Edward Willoughby (died 1650)	Thomas Willoughby, 11th Baron (c.1602–1691) de jure 1st Baron (1680 creation)
Henry Willoughby, 4th Baron (c. 1612–1617)	Francis Willoughby, 5th Baron (1614–1666)	William Willoughby, 6th Baron (c.1616–1673)	Henry Willoughby (1626–1685) de jure 11th Baron	Hugh Willoughby, 12th Baron (1637–1712) de jure 2nd Baron (1680 creation)	Francis; Willoughby
George Willoughby, 7th Baron (1638–1674)	John Willoughby, 9th Baron (1643–1678)	Charles Willoughby, 10th Baron (1650–1679)	Henry Willoughby (1665–1722) de jure 12th Baron	Edward Willoughby, 13th Baron (1676–1713) de jure 3rd Baron (1680 creation)	Charles Willoughby, 14th Baron (1681–1715) de jure 4th Baron (1680 creation)
John Willoughby, 8th Baron (1669–1678)	Henry Willoughby, 16th Baron (1696–1775) de jure 13th Baron	Fortune Willoughby (died 1750)	Hugh Willoughby, 15th Baron (c.1713–1765) de jure 5th Baron (1680 creation)
George Willoughby, 17th Baron (c.1748/49–1779) de jure 14th Baron

== Bibliography ==
- Brydges, Samuel Egerton (1805). Censura Literaria, Titles, Abstracts and Opinions of Old English Books. Vol. 1. London: T. Bentley.
- Burke, John (1831). A Genealogical and Heraldic Dictionary of the Peerages of England, Ireland, and Scotland, Extinct, Dormant, and in Abeyance. London: Henry Colburn and Richard Bentley.
- Cokayne, George E. (1959). White, Geoffrey H. (ed.). The Complete Peerage. Vol. 12 (part 2). London: The St Catherine Press.
- Greenwood, Isaac J. (1876). "The Willoughby Family of New England". The New England Historical and Genealogical Register. XXX. Boston: New England Historic Genealogical Society: 67–78.
- Hampson, Thomas (1893). History of Rivington. Wigan: "Observer" Office.
- Shaw, Ronald Cunliffe (1940). The Records of a Lancashire Family from the XIIth to the XXth Century [On the Shaw family. With plates and genealogical tables.] Preston: Guardian Press. ASIN B0017XWD3Q.
- Smith, M.D. (1989). Rivington, Lancashire. Chorley: Nelson Brothers Printers Limited. ISBN 0-9508772-8-X.
- Page, Augustine (1844). A Supplement to the Suffolk Traveller; or Topographical and Genealogical collections, concerning that county. Ipswich: Joshua Page.
