= Charles Willoughby, 2nd Baron Willoughby of Parham =

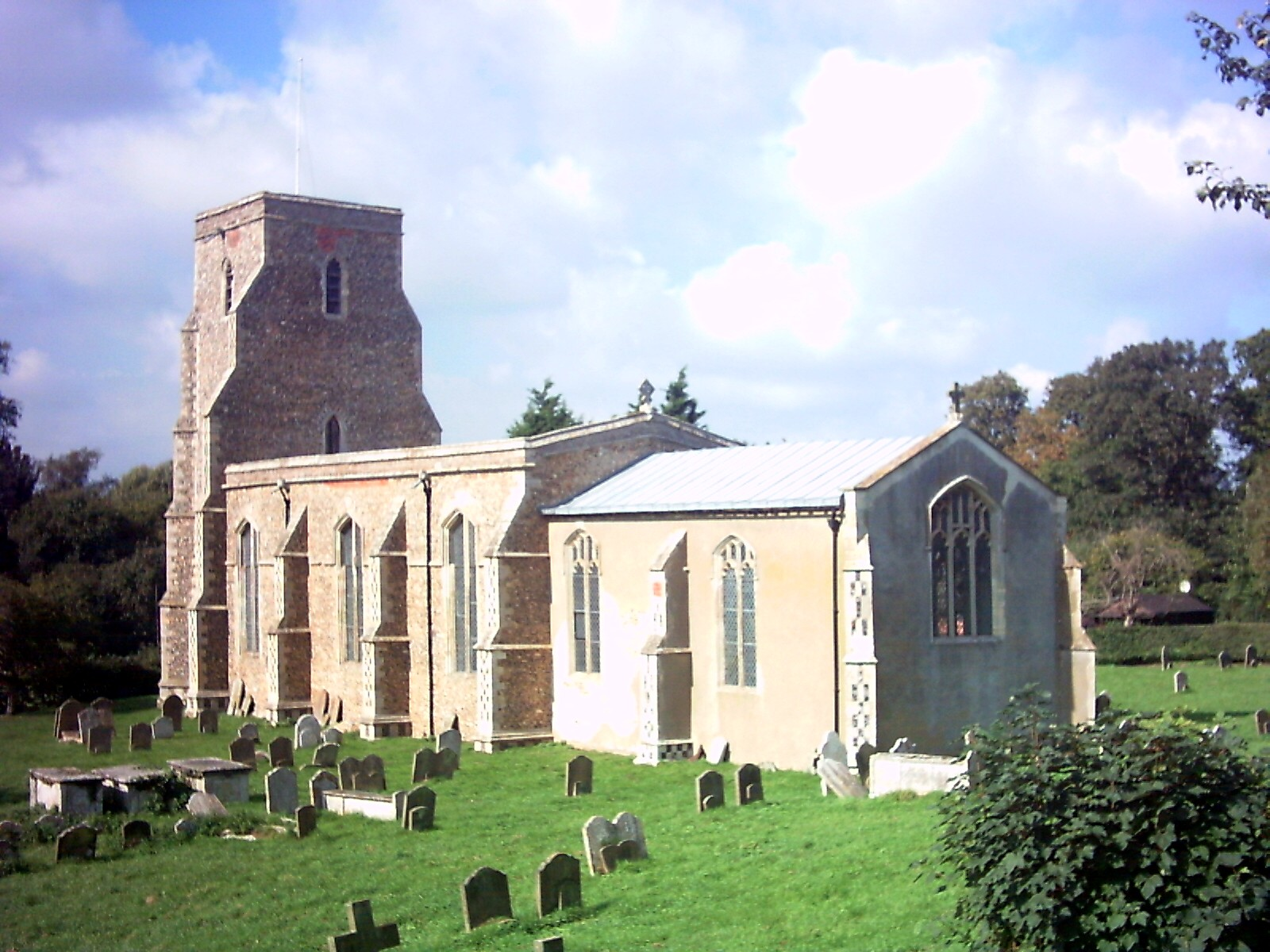
- Church of St Mary, Parham, Suffolk
- Born: c.1536/7
- Died: 1610–12
- Spouse(s): Margaret Clinton
- Issue: William Willoughby (father of William Willoughby 3rd Baron Willoughby of Parham); Sir Ambrose Willoughby; Edward Willoughby; Charles Willoughby; Thomas Willoughby; Katherine Willoughby; Margaret Willoughby; Anne Willoughby; Richard of Parham
- Father: William Willoughby, 1st Baron Willoughby of Parham
- Mother: Elizabeth Heneage

Charles Willoughby, 2nd Baron Willoughby of Parham (c.1536/7 – d. 1610–12) was the only son of William Willoughby, 1st Baron Willoughby of Parham, and Elizabeth Heneage.

== Family ==
Charles Willoughby, born about 1536/7, was the only son of William Willoughby, 1st Baron Willoughby of Parham, Suffolk, and his first wife, Elizabeth Heneage, daughter and heir of Sir Thomas Heneage of Hainton, Lincolnshire, by Katherine Skipwith, daughter of Sir John Skipwith of Ormsby.

== Career ==
Willoughby matriculated at St. John's College, Cambridge at Easter, 1549. He succeeded to the title at his father's death on 30 July 1570. He held administrative offices in Lincolnshire, and was one of the commissioners who tried Philip Howard, 20th Earl of Arundel, for treason on 14 April 1589.

Willoughby died between October 1610 and 26 October 1612. He was predeceased by his eldest son and heir, William, and the title passed to William's eldest son, who succeeded as 3rd Baron Willoughby of Parham.

The 3rd Baron's male heirs held the barony until Charles Willoughby, 10th Baron Willoughby of Parham (6 October 1650 – 9 December 1679), died without issue on 9 December 1679, when the title should have passed to the descendants of Sir Ambrose Willoughby, second son of the 2nd Baron. However Sir Ambrose Willoughby's descendants had emigrated to Virginia, and it was thought his male line was extinct. In consequence, the barony was wrongfully allowed to Thomas Willoughby (c.1602 – 29 February 1692), the fifth and youngest son of the 2nd Baron.

Charles Willoughby left his estate to his niece Elizabeth, who had married James Bertie, 1st Earl of Abingdon, ancestor of the present Earl of Abingdon.

== Marriage and issue ==
Willoughby married Margaret Clinton. Margaret was the third daughter of Edward Clinton, 1st Earl of Lincoln, Lord High Admiral of England, by his first wife, Elizabeth Blount, the eldest daughter of Sir John Blount of Kinlet, Shropshire. Before marrying the Earl of Lincoln, Elizabeth Blount had been the wife of Gilbert Tailboys, 1st Baron Tailboys of Kyme (died 15 April 1530). She was at one time the mistress of King Henry VIII, by whom she was the mother of his illegitimate son, Henry FitzRoy, 1st Duke of Richmond and Somerset.

By Margaret Clinton Willoughby had five sons, William, Sir Ambrose, Edward, Charles and Thomas, and three daughters, Katherine, Margaret and Anne. The eldest five, William, Ambrose, Edward, Katherine and Margaret, were named in the will of their grandmother, Katherine Skipwith, on 10 January 1572, and were all under 20 years of age at that time. Another son, Richard, is attributed to Charles Willoughby and was likely had out of wedlock.

Willoughby's second son, Ambrose, was one of the Queen's esquires of the body, and in early 1598 was involved in a brawl with Henry Wriothesley, 3rd Earl of Southampton. Ambrose Willoughby had ordered Southampton to leave the presence chamber where he was playing at primero after the Queen had retired for the evening. Southampton struck Willoughby, and 'Willoughby puld of some of his locke', for which the Queen gave Willoughby thanks, saying 'he had done better if he had sent him to the porters lodge, to see who durst have fetch him out'. There is a suggestion that underlying the altercation was something Willoughby had said which caused trouble between Southampton and his mistress, Elizabeth Vernon, one of the Queen's Maids of Honour. The Queen forbade Southampton to present himself at court, although he was soon allowed back.

Ambrose Willoughby is also mentioned in a letter of 17 June 1602 from John Chamberlain to Sir Dudley Carleton: "Gray Bridges hath hurt Ambrose Willoughby in the heade and body, for abusing his father and himself at a conference of arbiterment twixt them and Mistris Bridges".

Ambrose Willoughby was knighted in 1603.

== Footnotes ==
Peerage of England
Preceded by William Willoughby	Baron Willoughby of Parham; 1570–1603	Succeeded by William Willoughby
