= List of peers 1680–1689 =

This page lists all peers who held extant titles between 1680 and 1689.

== Peerage of England ==
Title	Holder	Date gained	Date lost	Notes
Duke of Cornwall (1337)	none	1649	1688	
Duke of Cornwall (1337)	Prince James Francis Edward	1688	1702	
Duke of Norfolk (1483)	Henry Howard, 6th Duke of Norfolk	1677	1684	Died
Duke of Norfolk (1483)	Henry Howard, 7th Duke of Norfolk	1684	1701	
Duke of Somerset (1547)	Charles Seymour, 6th Duke of Somerset	1678	1748	
Duke of Buckingham (1623)	George Villiers, 2nd Duke of Buckingham	1628	1687	Died, title extinct
Duke of Cumberland (1644)	Prince Rupert of the Rhine	1644	1682	Died, title extinct
Duke of York (1644)	James Stuart	1644	1685	Succeeded to the Throne, and his titles merged in the Crown
Duke of Albemarle (1660)	Christopher Monck, 2nd Duke of Albemarle	1670	1688	Died, title extinct
Duke of Monmouth (1663)	James Scott, 1st Duke of Monmouth	1663	1685	Attainted, and his titles were forfeited
Duke of Newcastle-upon-Tyne (1665)	Henry Cavendish, 2nd Duke of Newcastle-upon-Tyne	1676	1691	
Duke of Cleveland (1670)	Barbara Palmer, 1st Duchess of Cleveland	1670	1709	
Duke of Portsmouth (1673)	Louise de Kérouaille, Duchess of Portsmouth	1673	1734	
Duke of Richmond (1675)	Charles Lennox, 1st Duke of Richmond	1675	1723	
Duke of Southampton (1675)	Charles Fitzroy, 1st Duke of Southampton	1675	1730	
Duke of Grafton (1675)	Henry FitzRoy, 1st Duke of Grafton	1675	1690	
Duke of Ormonde (1682)	James Butler, 1st Duke of Ormonde	1682	1715	New creation; also Duke of Ormonde in the Peerage of Ireland
Duke of Beaufort (1682)	Henry Somerset, 1st Duke of Beaufort	1682	1700	New creation for the 3rd Marquess of Worcester
Duke of Northumberland (1683)	George FitzRoy, 1st Duke of Northumberland	1683	1716	New creation
Duke of St Albans (1684)	Charles Beauclerk, 1st Duke of St Albans	1684	1726	New creation
Duke of Berwick (1687)	James FitzJames, 1st Duke of Berwick	1687	1695	New creation
Duke of Cumberland (1689)	Prince George, Duke of Cumberland	1689	1708	New creation
Duke of Bolton (1689)	Charles Paulet, 1st Duke of Bolton	1689	1699	New creation; 6th Marquess of Winchester
Duke of Schomberg (1689)	Frederick Schomberg, 1st Duke of Schomberg	1689	1690	New creation
Marquess of Dorchester (1645)	Henry Pierrepont, 1st Marquess of Dorchester	1645	1680	Died, title extinct; Earldom of Kingston-upon-Hull succeeded by a cousin, see below
Marquess of Halifax (1682)	George Savile, 1st Marquess of Halifax	1682	1695	New creation
Marquess of Powis (1687)	William Herbert, 1st Marquess of Powis	1687	1696	New creation
Marquess of Carmarthen (1689)	Thomas Osborne, 1st Marquess of Carmarthen	1689	1712	New creation
Earl of Oxford (1142)	Aubrey de Vere, 20th Earl of Oxford	1632	1703	
Earl of Shrewsbury (1442)	Charles Talbot, 12th Earl of Shrewsbury	1668	1718	
Earl of Kent (1465)	Anthony Grey, 11th Earl of Kent	1651	1702	
Earl of Derby (1485)	William Stanley, 9th Earl of Derby	1672	1702	
Earl of Rutland (1525)	John Manners, 9th Earl of Rutlan	1679	1711	
Earl of Huntingdon (1529)	Theophilus Hastings, 7th Earl of Huntingdon	1656	1701	
Earl of Bedford (1550)	William Russell, 5th Earl of Bedford	1641	1700	
Earl of Pembroke (1551)	Philip Herbert, 7th Earl of Pembroke	1674	1683	Died
Earl of Pembroke (1551)	Thomas Herbert, 8th Earl of Pembroke	1683	1733	
Earl of Devon (1553)	William Courtenay, de jure 5th Earl of Devon	1638	1702	
Earl of Lincoln (1572)	Edward Clinton, 5th Earl of Lincoln	1667	1692	
Earl of Nottingham (1596)	Charles Howard, 3rd Earl of Nottingham	1642	1681	Died, title extinct
Earl of Suffolk (1603)	James Howard, 3rd Earl of Suffolk	1640	1689	Died
Earl of Suffolk (1603)	George Howard, 4th Earl of Suffolk	1689	1691	
Earl of Dorset (1604)	Charles Sackville, 6th Earl of Dorset	1677	1706	
Earl of Exeter (1605)	John Cecil, 5th Earl of Exeter	1678	1700	
Earl of Salisbury (1605)	James Cecil, 3rd Earl of Salisbury	1668	1683	Died
Earl of Salisbury (1605)	James Cecil, 4th Earl of Salisbury	1683	1694	
Earl of Bridgewater (1617)	John Egerton, 2nd Earl of Bridgewater	1649	1686	Died
Earl of Bridgewater (1617)	John Egerton, 3rd Earl of Bridgewater	1686	1701	
Earl of Northampton (1618)	James Compton, 3rd Earl of Northampton	1643	1681	Died
Earl of Northampton (1618)	George Compton, 4th Earl of Northampton	1681	1727	
Earl of Leicester (1618)	Philip Sidney, 3rd Earl of Leicester	1677	1698	
Earl of Warwick (1618)	Edward Rich, 6th Earl of Warwick	1675	1701	
Earl of Devonshire (1618)	William Cavendish, 3rd Earl of Devonshire	1628	1684	Died
Earl of Devonshire (1618)	William Cavendish, 4th Earl of Devonshire	1684	1707	
Earl of Denbigh (1622)	William Feilding, 3rd Earl of Denbigh	1675	1685	Died
Earl of Denbigh (1622)	Basil Feilding, 4th Earl of Denbigh	1685	1717	
Earl of Bristol (1622)	John Digby, 3rd Earl of Bristol	1677	1698	
Earl of Clare (1624)	Gilbert Holles, 3rd Earl of Clare	1666	1689	Died
Earl of Clare (1624)	John Holles, 4th Earl of Clare	1689	1711	
Earl of Bolingbroke (1624)	Oliver St John, 2nd Earl of Bolingbroke	1646	1688	Died
Earl of Bolingbroke (1624)	Paulet St John, 3rd Earl of Bolingbroke	1688	1711	
Earl of Westmorland (1624)	Charles Fane, 3rd Earl of Westmorland	1666	1691	
Earl of Manchester (1626)	Robert Montagu, 3rd Earl of Manchester	1671	1683	Died
Earl of Manchester (1626)	Charles Montagu, 4th Earl of Manchester	1683	1722	
Earl of Mulgrave (1626)	John Sheffield, 3rd Earl of Mulgrave	1658	1721	
Earl of Berkshire (1626)	Thomas Howard, 3rd Earl of Berkshire	1679	1706	
Earl Rivers (1626)	Thomas Savage, 3rd Earl Rivers	1654	1694	
Earl of Lindsey (1626)	Robert Bertie, 3rd Earl of Lindsey	1666	1701	
Earl of Peterborough (1628)	Henry Mordaunt, 2nd Earl of Peterborough	1643	1697	
Earl of Stamford (1628)	Thomas Grey, 2nd Earl of Stamford	1673	1720	
Earl of Winchilsea (1628)	Heneage Finch, 3rd Earl of Winchilsea	1639	1689	Died
Earl of Winchilsea (1628)	Charles Finch, 4th Earl of Winchilsea	1689	1712	
Earl of Kingston-upon-Hull (1628)	Robert Pierrepont, 3rd Earl of Kingston-upon-Hull	1680	1682	Died
Earl of Kingston-upon-Hull (1628)	William Pierrepont, 4th Earl of Kingston-upon-Hull	1682	1690	
Earl of Carnarvon (1628)	Charles Dormer, 2nd Earl of Carnarvon	1643	1709	
Earl of Chesterfield (1628)	Philip Stanhope, 2nd Earl of Chesterfield	1656	1714	
Earl of Thanet (1628)	John Tufton, 4th Earl of Thanet	1679	1680	Died
Earl of Thanet (1628)	Richard Tufton, 5th Earl of Thanet	1680	1684	Died
Earl of Thanet (1628)	Thomas Tufton, 6th Earl of Thanet	1684	1729	
Earl of Portland (1633)	Thomas Weston, 4th Earl of Portland	1665	1668	Died, title extinct
Earl of Strafford (1640)	William Wentworth, 2nd Earl of Strafford	1662	1695	
Earl of Sunderland (1643)	Robert Spencer, 2nd Earl of Sunderland	1643	1702	
Earl of Scarsdale (1645)	Nicholas Leke, 2nd Earl of Scarsdale	1655	1681	Died
Earl of Scarsdale (1645)	Robert Leke, 3rd Earl of Scarsdale	1681	1707	
Earl of Rochester (1652)	John Wilmot, 2nd Earl of Rochester	1658	1680	Died
Earl of Rochester (1652)	Charles Wilmot, 3rd Earl of Rochester	1680	1681	Died, title extinct
Earl of St Albans (1660)	Henry Jermyn, 1st Earl of St Albans	1660	1684	Died, title extinct
Earl of Sandwich (1660)	Edward Montagu, 2nd Earl of Sandwich	1672	1688	Died
Earl of Sandwich (1660)	Edward Montagu, 3rd Earl of Sandwich	1688	1729	
Earl of Brecknock (1660)	James Butler, 1st Earl of Brecknock	1660	1688	Created Duke of Ormonde, see above
Earl of Anglesey (1661)	Arthur Annesley, 1st Earl of Anglesey	1661	1686	Died
Earl of Anglesey (1661)	James Annesley, 2nd Earl of Anglesey	1686	1690	
Earl of Bath (1661)	John Granville, 1st Earl of Bath	1661	1701	
Earl of Cardigan (1661)	Robert Brudenell, 2nd Earl of Cardigan	1663	1703	
Earl of Clarendon (1661)	Henry Hyde, 2nd Earl of Clarendon	1674	1709	
Earl of Essex (1661)	Arthur Capell, 1st Earl of Essex	1661	1683	Died
Earl of Essex (1661)	Algernon Capell, 2nd Earl of Essex	1683	1710	
Earl of Carlisle (1661)	Charles Howard, 1st Earl of Carlisle	1661	1685	Died
Earl of Carlisle (1661)	Edward Howard, 2nd Earl of Carlisle	1685	1692	
Earl of Craven (1664)	William Craven, 1st Earl of Craven	1664	1697	
Earl of Ailesbury (1664)	Robert Bruce, 1st Earl of Ailesbury	1664	1685	Earl of Elgin in the Peerage of Scotland; died
Earl of Ailesbury (1664)	Thomas Bruce, 2nd Earl of Ailesbury	1685	1741	Earl of Elgin in the Peerage of Scotland
Earl of Burlington (1664)	Richard Boyle, 1st Earl of Burlington	1664	1698	Earl of Cork in the Peerage of Ireland
Earl of Arlington (1672)	Henry Bennet, 1st Earl of Arlington	1672	1685	Died
Earl of Arlington (1672)	Isabella Fitzroy, 2nd Countess of Arlington	1685	1723	
Earl of Shaftesbury (1672)	Anthony Ashley Cooper, 1st Earl of Shaftesbury	1672	1683	Died
Earl of Shaftesbury (1672)	Anthony Ashley-Cooper, 2nd Earl of Shaftesbury	1683	1699	
Earl of Powis (1674)	William Herbert, 1st Earl of Powis	1674	1696	Created Marquess of Powis, see above
Earl of Lichfield (1674)	Edward Lee, 1st Earl of Lichfield	1674	1716	
Earl of Guilford (1674)	John Maitland, 1st Earl of Guildford	1674	1682	Died, title extinct
Earl of Danby (1674)	Thomas Osborne, 1st Earl of Danby	1674	1712	Created Marquess of Carmarthen, see above
Earl of Northumberland (1674)	George FitzRoy, 1st Earl of Northumberland	1674	1716	Created Duke of Northumberland, see above
Earl of Sussex (1674)	Thomas Lennard, 1st Earl of Sussex	1674	1715	
Earl of Plymouth (1675)	Charles FitzCharles, 1st Earl of Plymouth	1675	1680	Died, title extinct
Earl of Feversham (1676)	Louis de Duras, 2nd Earl of Feversham	1677	1709	
Earl of Burford (1676)	Charles Beauclerk, 1st Earl of Burford	1676	1726	Created Duke of St Albans, see above
Earl of Conway (1679)	Edward Conway, 1st Earl of Conway	1679	1683	Died, title extinct
Earl of Halifax (1679)	George Savile, 1st Earl of Halifax	1679	1695	Created Marquess of Halifax, see above
Earl of Radnor (1679)	John Robartes, 1st Earl of Radnor	1679	1685	Died
Earl of Radnor (1679)	Charles Robartes, 2nd Earl of Radnor	1685	1723	
Earl of Macclesfield (1679)	Charles Gerard, 1st Earl of Macclesfield	1679	1694	
Earl of Yarmouth (1679)	Robert Paston, 1st Earl of Yarmouth	1679	1683	Died
Earl of Yarmouth (1679)	William Paston, 2nd Earl of Yarmouth	1683	1732	
Earl of Berkeley (1679)	George Berkeley, 1st Earl of Berkeley	1679	1698	
Earl of Shepey (1680)	Elizabeth Walter, Countess of Shepey	1680	1686	New creation, for life only; died, title extinct
Earl of Nottingham (1681)	Heneage Finch, 1st Earl of Nottingham	1681	1682	New creation; died
Earl of Nottingham (1681)	Daniel Finch, 2nd Earl of Nottingham	1682	1730	
Earl of Rochester (1682)	Laurence Hyde, 1st Earl of Rochester	1682	1711	New creation; Viscount Hyde in 1681
Earl of Abingdon (1682)	James Bertie, 1st Earl of Abingdon	1682	1699	New creation
Earl of Gainsborough (1682)	Edward Noel, 1st Earl of Gainsborough	1682	1689	New creation; died
Earl of Gainsborough (1682)	Wriothesley Noel, 2nd Earl of Gainsborough	1689	1690	
Earl of Plymouth (1682)	Thomas Hickman-Windsor, 1st Earl of Plymouth	1682	1687	New creation; died
Earl of Plymouth (1682)	Other Windsor, 2nd Earl of Plymouth	1687	1727	
Earl of Holderness (1682)	Conyers Darcy, 1st Earl of Holderness	1682	1689	New creation; died
Earl of Holderness (1682)	Conyers Darcy, 2nd Earl of Holderness	1689	1692	
Earl of Dorchester (1686)	Catherine Sedley, Countess of Dorchester	1686	1717	New creation, for life only
Earl of Derwentwater (1688)	Francis Radclyffe, 1st Earl of Derwentwater	1688	1697	New creation
Earl of Stafford (1688)	Mary Stafford, Countess of Stafford	1688	1694	New creation, for life only
Earl of Stafford (1688)	Henry Stafford Howard, 1st Earl of Stafford	1688	1719	New creation
Earl of Fauconberg (1689)	Thomas Belasyse, 1st Earl Fauconberg	1689	1700	New creation
Earl of Marlborough (1689)	John Churchill, 1st Earl of Marlborough	1689	1722	New creation; created Baron Churchill in 1685
Earl of Montagu (1689)	Ralph Montagu, 1st Earl of Montagu	1689	1709	New creation
Earl of Portland (1689)	William Bentinck, 1st Earl of Portland	1689	1709	New creation
Earl of Monmouth (1689)	Charles Mordaunt, 1st Earl of Monmouth	1689	1735	New creation
Earl of Torrington (1689)	Arthur Herbert, 1st Earl of Torrington	1689	1716	New creation
Viscount Hereford (1550)	Leicester Devereux, 7th Viscount Hereford	1676	1683	Died
Viscount Hereford (1550)	Edward Devereux, 8th Viscount Hereford	1683	1700	
Viscount Montagu (1554)	Francis Browne, 3rd Viscount Montagu	1629	1682	Died
Viscount Montagu (1554)	Francis Browne, 4th Viscount Montagu	1682	1708	
Viscount Saye and Sele (1624)	William Fiennes, 3rd Viscount Saye and Sele	1674	1698	
Viscount Campden (1628)	Baptist Noel, 3rd Viscount Campden	1643	1682	
Viscount Campden (1628)	Edward Noel, 4th Viscount Campden	1682	1689	Creataed Earl of Gainsborough, see above; created Baron Noel in 1681
Viscount Stafford (1640)	William Howard, 1st Viscount Stafford	1640	1680	Attainted, and his honours forfeited
Viscount Fauconberg (1643)	Thomas Belasyse, 2nd Viscount Fauconberg	1652	1700	Created Earl of Fauconberg, see above
Viscount Mordaunt (1659)	Charles Mordaunt, 2nd Viscount Mordaunt	1675	1735	Created Earl of Monmouth, see above
Viscount Bayning of Newport (1675)	Francis Newport, 1st Viscount Newport	1675	1708	
Viscount Corbet of Linchlade (1679)	Sarah Corbet, Viscountess Corbet of Linchlade	1679	1682	Died, title extinct
Viscount Hatton (1682)	Christopher Hatton, 1st Viscount Hatton	1682	1706	New creation
Viscount Townshend (1682)	Horatio Townshend, 1st Viscount Townshend	1682	1687	New creation; died
Viscount Townshend (1682)	Charles Townshend, 2nd Viscount Townshend	1687	1738	
Viscount Weymouth (1682)	Thomas Thynne, 1st Viscount Weymouth	1682	1714	New creation
Viscount Lumley (1689)	Richard Lumley, 1st Viscount Lumley	1689	1721	New creation; cr. Baron Lumley in 1681
Viscount Sydney (1689)	Henry Sydney, 1st Viscount Sydney	1689	1704	New creation
Baron FitzWalter (1295)	Charles Mildmay, 18th Baron FitzWalter	1679	1728	
Baron Ferrers of Chartley (1299)	Robert Shirley, 14th Baron Ferrers of Chartley	1677	1717	
Baron Morley (1299)	Thomas Parker, 15th Baron Morley	1655	1697	
Baron Grey of Ruthyn (1325)	Henry Yelverton, 15th Baron Grey of Ruthyn	1679	1704	
Baron Darcy de Knayth (1332)	Conyers Darcy, 8th Baron Darcy de Knayth	1653	1689	Created Earl of Holderness in 1682; Barony held by his heirs until 1778
Baron Dudley (1440)	Frances Ward, 6th Baroness Dudley	1643	1697	
Baron Stourton (1448)	William Stourton, 12th Baron Stourton	1672	1685	Died
Baron Stourton (1448)	Edward Stourton, 13th Baron Stourton	1685	1720	
Baron Willoughby de Broke (1491)	William Verney, 10th Baron Willoughby de Broke	1668	1683	Died
Baron Willoughby de Broke (1491)	Richard Verney, 11th Baron Willoughby de Broke	1683	1711	
Baron Monteagle (1514)	Thomas Parker, 6th Baron Monteagle	1655	1697	
Baron Sandys of the Vine (1529)	Henry Sandys, 7th Baron Sandys	1668	1680	Died
Baron Sandys of the Vine (1529)	Edwin Sandys, 8th Baron Sandys	1680	1683	Died, Barony fell into abeyance
Baron Windsor (1529)	Thomas Hickman-Windsor, 7th Baron Windsor	1660	1687	Created Earl of Plymouth in 1682, see above
Baron Wentworth (1529)	Henrietta Wentworth, 6th Baroness Wentworth	1667	1686	Died
Baron Wentworth (1529)	Anne Lovelace, 7th Baroness Wentworth	1686	1697	
Baron Eure (1544)	Ralph Eure, 7th Baron Eure	1672	1707	
Baron Wharton (1545)	Philip Wharton, 4th Baron Wharton	1625	1695	
Baron Willoughby of Parham (1547)	Henry Willoughby, de jure 11th Baron Willoughby of Parham	1679	1685	Died
Baron Willoughby of Parham (1547)	Henry Willoughby, de jure 12th Baron Willoughby of Parham	1685	1722	
Baron Paget (1552)	William Paget, 6th Baron Paget	1678	1713	
Baron North (1554)	Charles North, 5th Baron North	1677	1691	
Baron Howard of Effingham (1554)	Francis Howard, 5th Baron Howard of Effingham	1681	1695	Title previously held by the Earls of Nottingham
Baron Chandos (1554)	James Brydges, 8th Baron Chandos	1676	1714	
Baron Hunsdon (1559)	Robert Carey, 6th Baron Hunsdon	1677	1692	
Baron De La Warr (1570)	Charles West, 5th Baron De La Warr	1628	1687	Died
Baron De La Warr (1570)	John West, 6th Baron De La Warr	1687	1723	
Baron Norreys (1572)	James Bertie, 5th Baron Norreys	1657	1699	Created Earl of Abingdon in 1682, see above
Baron Gerard (1603)	Digby Gerard, 5th Baron Gerard	1667	1684	Died
Baron Gerard (1603)	Charles Gerard, 6th Baron Gerard	1684	1707	
Baron Petre (1603)	William Petre, 4th Baron Petre	1638	1684	Died
Baron Petre (1603)	John Petre, 5th Baron Petre	1684	1684	Died
Thomas Petre, 6th Baron Petre	1684	1706		
Baron Arundell of Wardour (1605)	Henry Arundell, 3rd Baron Arundell of Wardour	1643	1694	
Baron Clifton (1608)	Katherine O'Brien, 7th Baroness Clifton	1672	1702	
Baron Teynham (1616)	Christopher Roper, 5th Baron Teynham	1673	1689	Died
Baron Teynham (1616)	John Roper, 6th Baron Teynham	1689	1697	
Baron Brooke (1621)	Fulke Greville, 5th Baron Brooke	1677	1710	
Baron Montagu of Boughton (1621)	Edward Montagu, 2nd Baron Montagu of Boughton	1644	1684	Died
Baron Montagu of Boughton (1621)	Ralph Montagu, 3rd Baron Montagu of Boughton	1644	1684	Created Earl of Montagu, see above
Baron Grey of Warke (1624)	Ford Grey, 3rd Baron Grey of Werke	1674	1701	
Baron Lovelace (1627)	John Lovelace, 3rd Baron Lovelace	1670	1693	
Baron Poulett (1627)	John Poulett, 4th Baron Poulett	1679	1743	
Baron Clifford (1628)	Elizabeth Boyle, Baroness Clifford	1643	1691	
Baron Maynard (1628)	William Maynard, 2nd Baron Maynard	1640	1699	
Baron Coventry (1628)	George Coventry, 3rd Baron Coventry	1661	1680	Died
Baron Coventry (1628)	John Coventry, 4th Baron Coventry	1680	1687	Died
Baron Coventry (1628)	Thomas Coventry, 5th Baron Coventry	1687	1699	
Baron Mohun of Okehampton (1628)	Charles Mohun, 4th Baron Mohun of Okehampton	1677	1712	
Baron Herbert of Chirbury (1629)	Henry Herbert, 4th Baron Herbert of Chirbury	1678	1691	
Baron Hatton (1642)	Christopher Hatton, 2nd Baron Hatton	1670	1706	Created Viscount Hatton in 1683, see above
Baron Leigh (1643)	Thomas Leigh, 2nd Baron Leigh	1672	1710	
Baron Jermyn (1643)	Thomas Jermyn, 2nd Baron Jermyn	1684	1703	Title previously held by the Earl of St Albans
Baron Byron (1643)	William Byron, 3rd Baron Byron	1679	1695	
Baron Widdrington (1643)	William Widdrington, 3rd Baron Widdrington	1675	1695	
Baron Ward (1644)	Edward Ward, 2nd Baron Ward	1670	1701	
Baron Colepeper (1644)	Thomas Colepeper, 2nd Baron Colepeper	1660	1689	Died
Baron Colepeper (1644)	John Colepeper, 3rd Baron of Colepeper	1689	1719	
Baron Astley of Reading (1644)	Jacob Astley, 3rd Baron Astley of Reading	1662	1688	Died, title extinct
Baron Lucas of Shenfield (1645)	Charles Lucas, 2nd Baron Lucas of Shenfield	1671	1688	Died
Baron Lucas of Shenfield (1645)	Robert Lucas, 3rd Baron Lucas of Shenfield	1688	1705	
Baron Belasyse (1645)	John Belasyse, 1st Baron Belasyse	1645	1689	Died
Baron Belasyse (1645)	Henry Belasyse, 2nd Baron Belasyse	1689	1691	
Baron Rockingham (1645)	Edward Watson, 2nd Baron Rockingham	1653	1689	Died
Baron Rockingham (1645)	Lewis Watson, 3rd Baron Rockingham	1689	1724	
Baron Lexinton (1645)	Robert Sutton, 2nd Baron Lexinton	1668	1723	
Baron Wotton (1650)	Charles Kirkhoven, 1st Baron Wotton	1650	1683	Created Earl of Bellomont in the Peerage of Ireland; died, both titles extinct
Baron Langdale (1658)	Marmaduke Langdale, 2nd Baron Langdale	1661	1703	
Baron Berkeley of Stratton (1658)	Charles Berkeley, 2nd Baron Berkeley of Stratton	1678	1681	Died
Baron Berkeley of Stratton (1658)	John Berkeley, 3rd Baron Berkeley of Stratton	1681	1697	
Baron Cornwallis (1661)	Charles Cornwallis, 3rd Baron Cornwallis	1673	1698	
Baron Crew (1661)	Thomas Crew, 2nd Baron Crew	1679	1697	
Baron Delamer (1661)	George Booth, 1st Baron Delamer	1661	1684	Died
Baron Delamer (1661)	Henry Booth, 2nd Baron Delamer	1684	1694	
Baron Holles (1661)	Denzil Holles, 1st Baron Holles	1661	1680	Died
Baron Holles (1661)	Francis Holles, 2nd Baron Holles	1680	1690	
Baron Townshend (1661)	Horatio Townshend, 1st Baron Townshend	1661	1687	Created Viscount Townshend in 1682, see above
Baron (A)bergavenny (1662)	George Nevill, 12th Baron Bergavenny	1666	1695	
Baron Lucas of Crudwell (1663)	Mary Grey, 1st Baroness Lucas	1663	1702	
Baron Arundell of Trerice (1664)	Richard Arundell, 1st Baron Arundell of Trerice	1664	1687	Died
Baron Arundell of Trerice (1664)	John Arundell, 2nd Baron Arundell of Trerice	1687	1698	
Baron Frescheville (1665)	John Frescheville, 1st Baron Frescheville	1665	1682	Died, title extinct
Baron Clifford of Chudleigh (1672)	Hugh Clifford, 2nd Baron Clifford of Chudleigh	1673	1730	
Baron Finch (1674)	Heneage Finch, 1st Baron Finch	1674	1682	Created Earl of Nottingham in 1681, see above
Baron Belasyse of Osgodby (1674)	Susan Belasyse, Baroness Belasyse	1674	1713	
Baron Willoughby of Parham (1680)	Thomas Willoughby, 11th Baron Willoughby of Parham	1680	1692	New creation
Baron Carteret (1681)	George Carteret, 1st Baron Carteret	1681	1695	New creation
Baron Ossulston (1682)	John Bennet, 1st Baron Ossulston	1682	1695	New creation
Baron Dartmouth (1682)	George Legge, 1st Baron Dartmouth	1682	1691	New creation
Baron Stawell (1683)	Ralph Stawell, 1st Baron Stawell	1683	1689	New creation; died
Baron Stawell (1683)	John Stawell, 2nd Baron Stawell	1689	1692	
Baron Guilford (1683)	Francis North, 1st Baron Guilford	1683	1685	New creation; died
Baron Guilford (1683)	Francis North, 2nd Baron Guilford	1685	1729	
Baron Godolphin (1684)	Sidney Godolphin, 1st Baron Godolphin	1684	1712	New creation
Baron Jeffreys (1685)	George Jeffreys, 1st Baron Jeffreys	1685	1689	
Baron Jeffreys (1685)	John Jeffreys, 2nd Baron Jeffreys	1689	1702	
Baron Waldegrave (1686)	Henry Waldegrave, 1st Baron Waldegrave	1686	1689	New creation, died
Baron Waldegrave (1686)	James Waldegrave, 2nd Baron Waldegrave	1689	1741	
Baron Griffin (1688)	Edward Griffin, 1st Baron Griffin	1688	1710	New creation
Baron Ashburnham (1689)	John Ashburnham, 1st Baron Ashburnham	1689	1710	New creation
Baron Cholmondeley (1689)	Hugh Cholmondeley, 1st Baron Cholmondeley	1689	1725	New creation

== Peerage of Scotland ==
Title	Holder	Date gained	Date lost	Notes
Duke of Rothesay (1398)	James Stuart, Duke of Rothesay	1688	1702	
Duke of Hamilton (1643)	Anne Hamilton, 3rd Duchess of Hamilton	1651	1698	
Duke of Albany (1660)	Prince James, Duke of Albany	1660	1685	Acceded to the Throne of England and Scotland
Duke of Buccleuch (1663)	Anne Scott, 1st Duchess of Buccleuch	1663	1732	
Duke of Lauderdale (1672)	John Maitland, 1st Duke of Lauderdale	1672	1682	Died, title extinct
Duke of Lennox (1675)	Charles Lennox, 1st Duke of Lennox	1675	1723	
Duke of Rothes (1680)	John Leslie, 1st Duke of Rothes	1680	1681	New creation; died, title extinct
Duke of Queensberry (1684)	William Douglas, 1st Duke of Queensberry	1684	1695	New creation; also Marquess of Quensberry in 1682
Duke of Gordon (1684)	George Gordon, 1st Duke of Gordon	1684	1716	New creation
Marquess of Huntly (1599)	George Gordon, 4th Marquess of Huntly	1653	1716	Created of Gordon, see above
Marquess of Douglas (1633)	James Douglas, 2nd Marquess of Douglas	1660	1700	
Marquess of Montrose (1644)	James Graham, 3rd Marquess of Montrose	1669	1684	Died
Marquess of Montrose (1644)	James Graham, 4th Marquess of Montrose	1684	1742	
Marquess of Atholl (1676)	John Murray, 1st Marquess of Atholl	1676	1703	
Earl of Argyll (1457)	Archibald Campbell, 9th Earl of Argyll	1663	1685	Died
Earl of Argyll (1457)	Archibald Campbell, 10th Earl of Argyll	1685	1703	
Earl of Crawford (1398)	William Lindsay, 18th Earl of Crawford	1678	1698	
Earl of Erroll (1452)	John Hay, 12th Earl of Erroll	1674	1704	
Earl Marischal (1458)	George Keith, 8th Earl Marischal	1671	1694	
Earl of Sutherland (1235)	George Gordon, 15th Earl of Sutherland	1679	1703	
Earl of Mar (1114)	Charles Erskine, Earl of Mar	1668	1689	Died
Earl of Mar (1114)	John Erskine, Earl of Mar	1689	1732	
Earl of Rothes (1458)	John Leslie, 7th Earl of Rothes	1641	1681	Created Duke of Rothes, see above; died
Earl of Rothes (1458)	Margaret Leslie, 8th Countess of Rothes	1681	1700	
Earl of Morton (1458)	William Douglas, 9th Earl of Morton	1649	1681	Died
Earl of Morton (1458)	James Douglas, 10th Earl of Morton	1681	1686	Died
Earl of Morton (1458)	James Douglas, 11th Earl of Morton	1686	1715	
Earl of Menteith (1427)	William Graham, 8th Earl of Menteith	1661	1694	
Earl of Glencairn (1488)	John Cunningham, 11th Earl of Glencairn	1670	1703	
Earl of Eglinton (1507)	Alexander Montgomerie, 8th Earl of Eglinton	1669	1701	
Earl of Cassilis (1509)	John Kennedy, 7th Earl of Cassilis	1668	1701	
Earl of Caithness (1455)	In dispute	1672	1681	
Earl of Caithness (1455)	George Sinclair, 7th Earl of Caithness	1681	1698	
Earl of Buchan (1469)	William Erskine, 8th Earl of Buchan	1664	1695	
Earl of Moray (1562)	Alexander Stuart, 5th Earl of Moray	1653	1701	
Earl of Linlithgow (1600)	George Livingston, 3rd Earl of Linlithgow	1650	1690	
Earl of Winton (1600)	George Seton, 4th Earl of Winton	1650	1704	
Earl of Home (1605)	James Home, 5th Earl of Home	1678	1687	Died
Earl of Home (1605)	Charles Home, 6th Earl of Home	1687	1706	
Earl of Perth (1605)	James Drummond, 4th Earl of Perth	1675	1716	
Earl of Dunfermline (1605)	James Seton, 4th Earl of Dunfermline	1677	1690	
Earl of Wigtown (1606)	William Fleming, 5th Earl of Wigtown	1668	1681	Died
Earl of Wigtown (1606)	John Fleming, 6th Earl of Wigtown	1681	1744	
Earl of Abercorn (1606)	George Hamilton, 3rd Earl of Abercorn	1670	1680	Died
Earl of Abercorn (1606)	Claud Hamilton, 4th Earl of Abercorn	1680	1691	
Earl of Strathmore and Kinghorne (1606)	Patrick Lyon, 3rd Earl of Strathmore and Kinghorne	1646	1695	
Earl of Roxburghe (1616)	Robert Ker, 3rd Earl of Roxburghe	1675	1682	
Earl of Roxburghe (1616)	Robert Ker, 4th Earl of Roxburghe	1682	1696	
Earl of Kellie (1619)	Alexander Erskine, 4th Earl of Kellie	1677	1710	
Earl of Haddington (1619)	Charles Hamilton, 5th Earl of Haddington	1669	1685	Died
Earl of Haddington (1619)	Thomas Hamilton, 6th Earl of Haddington	1685	1735	
Earl of Nithsdale (1620)	Robert Maxwell, 4th Earl of Nithsdale	1677	1696	
Earl of Galloway (1623)	Alexander Stewart, 3rd Earl of Galloway	1671	1690	
Earl of Seaforth (1623)	Kenneth Mackenzie, 4th Earl of Seaforth	1678	1701	
Earl of Lauderdale (1624)	Charles Maitland, 3rd Earl of Lauderdale	1682	1691	Earldom previously held by the Duke of Lauderdale
Earl of Lothian (1631)	Robert Kerr, 2nd Earl of Lothian	1675	1703	
Earl of Airth (1633)	William Graham, 2nd Earl of Airth	1661	1694	
Earl of Loudoun (1633)	James Campbell, 2nd Earl of Loudoun	1662	1684	Died
Earl of Loudoun (1633)	Hugh Campbell, 3rd Earl of Loudoun	1684	1731	
Earl of Kinnoull (1633)	George Hay, 5th Earl of Kinnoull	1677	1687	Died
Earl of Kinnoull (1633)	William Hay, 6th Earl of Kinnoull	1687	1709	
Earl of Dumfries (1633)	William Crichton, 2nd Earl of Dumfries	1643	1691	
Earl of Queensberry (1633)	William Douglas, 3rd Earl of Queensberry	1671	1695	Created Marquess of Queensberry in 1682, and Duke of Queensberry in 1684, see above
Earl of Stirling (1633)	Henry Alexander, 4th Earl of Stirling	1644	1691	
Earl of Elgin (1633)	Robert Bruce, 2nd Earl of Elgin	1663	1685	Died
Earl of Elgin (1633)	Thomas Bruce, 3rd Earl of Elgin	1685	1741	
Earl of Southesk (1633)	Robert Carnegie, 3rd Earl of Southesk	1669	1688	Died
Earl of Southesk (1633)	Charles Carnegie, 4th Earl of Southesk	1688	1699	
Earl of Traquair (1633)	Charles Stewart, 4th Earl of Traquair	1673	1741	
Earl of Ancram (1633)	Charles Kerr, 2nd Earl of Ancram	1654	1690	
Earl of Wemyss (1633)	Margaret Wemyss, 3rd Countess of Wemyss	1679	1705	
Earl of Dalhousie (1633)	William Ramsay, 3rd Earl of Dalhousie	1674	1682	Died
Earl of Dalhousie (1633)	George Ramsay, 4th Earl of Dalhousie	1682	1696	
Earl of Findlater (1638)	James Ogilvy, 3rd Earl of Findlater	1658	1711	
Earl of Airlie (1639)	James Ogilvy, 2nd Earl of Airlie	1665	1703	
Earl of Carnwath (1639)	James Dalzell, 3rd Earl of Carnwath	1674	1683	Died
Earl of Carnwath (1639)	John Dalzell, 4th Earl of Carnwath	1683	1702	
Earl of Callendar (1641)	Alexander Livingston, 2nd Earl of Callendar	1674	1685	Died
Earl of Callendar (1641)	Alexander Livingston, 3rd Earl of Callendar	1685	1692	
Earl of Leven (1641)	David Leslie, 3rd Earl of Leven	1676	1728	
Earl of Dysart (1643)	Elizabeth Tollemache, 2nd Countess of Dysart	1654	1698	
Earl of Panmure (1646)	George Maule, 3rd Earl of Panmure	1671	1686	Died
Earl of Panmure (1646)	James Maule, 4th Earl of Panmure	1686	1716	
Earl of Selkirk (1646)	William Hamilton, 1st Earl of Selkirk	1646	1694	
Earl of Tweeddale (1646)	John Hay, 2nd Earl of Tweeddale	1653	1697	
Earl of Northesk (1647)	David Carnegie, 3rd Earl of Northesk	1679	1688	Died
Earl of Northesk (1647)	David Carnegie, 4th Earl of Northesk	1688	1729	
Earl of Kincardine (1647)	Alexander Bruce, 2nd Earl of Kincardine	1662	1680	Died
Earl of Kincardine (1647)	Alexander Bruce, 3rd Earl of Kincardine	1680	1705	
Earl of Balcarres (1651)	Colin Lindsay, 3rd Earl of Balcarres	1662	1722	
Earl of Tarras (1660)	Walter Scott, Earl of Tarras	1660	1693	
Earl of Aboyne (1660)	Charles Gordon, 1st Earl of Aboyne	1660	1681	Died
Earl of Aboyne (1660)	Charles Gordon, 2nd Earl of Aboyne	1681	1702	
Earl of Middleton (1660)	Charles Middleton, 2nd Earl of Middleton	1674	1695	
Earl of Newburgh (1660)	Charles Livingston, 2nd Earl of Newburgh	1670	1755	
Earl of Annandale and Hartfell (1661)	William Johnstone, 2nd Earl of Annandale and Hartfell	1672	1721	
Earl of Kilmarnock (1661)	William Boyd, 1st Earl of Kilmarnock	1661	1692	
Earl of Forfar (1661)	Archibald Douglas, 1st Earl of Forfar	1661	1712	
Earl of Dundonald (1669)	William Cochrane, 1st Earl of Dundonald	1669	1685	Died
Earl of Dundonald (1669)	John Cochrane, 2nd Earl of Dundonald	1685	1690	
Earl of Dumbarton (1675)	George Douglas, 1st Earl of Dumbarton	1675	1692	
Earl of Kintore (1677)	John Keith, 1st Earl of Kintore	1677	1714	
Earl of Breadalbane and Holland (1677)	John Campbell, 1st Earl of Breadalbane and Holland	1677	1717	
Earl of Aberdeen (1682)	George Gordon, 1st Earl of Aberdeen	1682	1720	New creation
Earl of Melfort (1686)	John Drummond, 1st Earl of Melfort	1686	1695	New creation; also created Viscount of Melfort in 1685
Earl of Dunmore (1686)	Charles Murray, 1st Earl of Dunmore	1686	1710	New creation
Viscount of Falkland (1620)	Anthony Cary, 5th Viscount of Falkland	1663	1694	
Viscount of Dunbar (1620)	Robert Constable, 3rd Viscount of Dunbar	1668	1714	
Viscount of Stormont (1621)	David Murray, 5th Viscount of Stormont	1668	1731	
Viscount of Kenmure (1633)	Alexander Gordon, 5th Viscount of Kenmure	1663	1698	
Viscount of Arbuthnott (1641)	Robert Arbuthnot, 2nd Viscount of Arbuthnott	1655	1682	Died
Viscount of Arbuthnott (1641)	Robert Arbuthnot, 3rd Viscount of Arbuthnott	1682	1694	
Viscount of Frendraught (1642)	William Crichton, 3rd Viscount of Frendraught	1678	1686	Died
Viscount of Frendraught (1642)	Lewis Crichton, 4th Viscount of Frendraught	1686	1690	
Viscount of Oxfuird (1651)	Robert Makgill, 2nd Viscount of Oxfuird	1663	1706	
Viscount of Kingston (1651)	Alexander Seton, 1st Viscount of Kingston	1651	1691	
Viscount of Irvine (1661)	Arthur Ingram, 3rd Viscount of Irvine	1668	1702	
Viscount of Kilsyth (1661)	James Livingston, 2nd Viscount of Kilsyth	1661	1706	
Viscount Preston (1681)	Richard Graham, 1st Viscount Preston	1681	1695	New creation
Viscount of Newhaven (1681)	Charles Cheyne, 1st Viscount Newhaven	1681	1698	New creation
Viscount of Teviot (1685)	Robert Spencer, 1st Viscount Teviot	1685	1694	New creation
Viscount of Tarbat (1685)	George Mackenzie, 1st Viscount of Tarbat	1685	1714	New creation
Viscount of Strathallan (1686)	William Drummond, 1st Viscount Strathallan	1686	1688	New creation; died
Viscount of Strathallan (1686)	William Drummond, 2nd Viscount Strathallan	1688	1702	
Viscount of Dundee (1688)	John Graham, 1st Viscount of Dundee	1688	1689	New creation; died
Viscount of Dundee (1688)	James Graham, 2nd Viscount of Dundee	1689	1689	Died
Viscount of Dundee (1688)	David Graham, 3rd Viscount of Dundee	1689	1690	
Lord Somerville (1430)	James Somerville, 11th Lord Somerville	1677	1693	
Lord Forbes (1442)	William Forbes, 11th Lord Forbes	1672	1697	
Lord Saltoun (1445)	Alexander Fraser, 11th Lord Saltoun	1669	1693	
Lord Gray (1445)	Patrick Gray, 8th Lord Gray	1663	1711	
Lord Sinclair (1449)	Henry St Clair, 10th Lord Sinclair	1676	1723	
Lord Oliphant (1455)	Patrick Oliphant, 6th Lord Oliphant	1631	1680	Died
Lord Oliphant (1455)	Charles Oliphant, 7th Lord Oliphant	1680	1709	
Lord Cathcart (1460)	Alan Cathcart, 6th Lord Cathcart	1628	1709	
Lord Lovat (1464)	Hugh Fraser, 9th Lord Lovat	1672	1696	
Lord Sempill (1489)	Francis Sempill, 8th Lord Sempill	1675	1684	Died
Lord Sempill (1489)	Anne Abercromby, 9th Lady Sempill	1684	1695	
Lord Ross (1499)	George Ross, 11th Lord Ross	1656	1682	Died
Lord Ross (1499)	William Ross, 12th Lord Ross	1682	1738	
Lord Elphinstone (1509)	John Elphinstone, 8th Lord Elphinstone	1669	1718	
Lord Torphichen (1564)	Walter Sandilands, 6th Lord Torphichen	1649	1696	
Lord Lindores (1600)	John Leslie, 4th Lord Lindores	1666	1706	
Lord Colville of Culross (1604)	John Colville, 4th Lord Colville of Culross	1656	1680	Died
Lord Colville of Culross (1604)	Alexander Colville, 5th Lord Colville of Culross	1680	1717	
Lord Balmerinoch (1606)	John Elphinstone, 3rd Lord Balmerino	1649	1704	
Lord Blantyre (1606)	Alexander Stuart, 5th Lord Blantyre	1670	1704	
Lord Balfour of Burleigh (1607)	John Balfour, 3rd Lord Balfour of Burleigh	1663	1688	Died
Lord Balfour of Burleigh (1607)	Robert Balfour, 4th Lord Balfour of Burleigh	1688	1713	
Lord Cranstoun (1609)	James Cranstoun, 4th Lord Cranstoun	1664	1688	Died
Lord Cranstoun (1609)	William Cranstoun, 5th Lord Cranstoun	1688	1727	
Lord Maderty (1609)	David Drummond, 3rd Lord Madderty	1647	1692	Created Viscount Strathallan, see above
Lord Dingwall (1609)	Elizabeth Preston, 2nd Lady Dingwall	1628	1684	Died
Lord Dingwall (1609)	James Butler, 3rd Lord Dingwall	1684	1715	
Lord Cardross (1610)	Henry Erskine, 3rd Lord Cardross	1671	1693	
Lord Melville of Monymaill (1616)	George Melville, 4th Lord Melville	1643	1707	
Lord Jedburgh (1622)	Robert Ker, 4th Lord Jedburgh	1670	1692	
Lord Aston of Forfar (1627)	Walter Aston, 3rd Lord Aston of Forfar	1678	1714	
Lord Fairfax of Cameron (1627)	Henry Fairfax, 4th Lord Fairfax of Cameron	1671	1688	Died
Lord Fairfax of Cameron (1627)	Thomas Fairfax, 5th Lord Fairfax of Cameron	1688	1710	
Lord Napier (1627)	Archibald Napier, 3rd Lord Napier	1660	1683	Died
Lord Napier (1627)	Margaret Brisbane, 5th Lady Napier	1683	1706	
Lord Reay (1628)	John Mackay, 2nd Lord Reay	1649	1681	Died
Lord Reay (1628)	George Mackay, 3rd Lord Reay	1681	1748	
Lord Cramond (1628)	Henry Richardson, 3rd Lord Cramond	1674	1701	
Lord Forbes of Pitsligo (1633)	Alexander Forbes, 2nd Lord Forbes of Pitsligo	1636	1690	
Lord Kirkcudbright (1633)	James Maclellan, 6th Lord Kirkcudbright	1678	1730	
Lord Fraser (1633)	Andrew Fraser, 3rd Lord Fraser	1674	Abt 1680	Died
Lord Fraser (1633)	Charles Fraser, 4th Lord Fraser	Abt 1680	1715	
Lord Forrester (1633)	William Baillie, 3rd Lord Forrester	1676	1681	Died
Lord Forrester (1633)	William Forrester, 4th Lord Forrester	1681	1705	
Lord Bargany (1641)	John Hamilton, 2nd Lord Bargany	1658	1693	
Lord Banff (1642)	George Ogilvy, 3rd Lord Banff	1668	1713	
Lord Elibank (1643)	Patrick Murray, 3rd Lord Elibank	1661	1687	Died
Lord Elibank (1643)	Alexander Murray, 4th Lord Elibank	1687	1736	
Lord Dunkeld (1645)	Thomas Galloway, 2nd Lord Dunkeld	1660	1684	
Lord Dunkeld (1645)	James Galloway, 3rd Lord Dunkeld	1684	1690	
Lord Falconer of Halkerton (1646)	Alexander Falconer, 2nd Lord Falconer of Halkerton	1671	1684	Died
Lord Falconer of Halkerton (1646)	David Falconer, 3rd Lord Falconer of Halkerton	1684	1724	
Lord Abercrombie (1647)	James Sandilands, 2nd Lord Abercrombie	1658	1681	Died, title extinct
Lord Belhaven and Stenton (1647)	John Hamilton, 2nd Lord Belhaven and Stenton	1679	1708	
Lord Carmichael (1647)	John Carmichael, 2nd Lord Carmichael	1672	1710	
Lord Duffus (1650)	James Sutherland, 2nd Lord Duffus	1674	1705	
Lord Rollo (1651)	Andrew Rollo, 3rd Lord Rollo	1669	1700	
Lord Ruthven of Freeland (1650)	David Ruthven, 2nd Lord Ruthven of Freeland	1673	1701	
Lord Rutherfurd (1661)	Archibald Rutherfurd, 3rd Lord Rutherfurd	1668	1685	Died
Lord Rutherfurd (1661)	Robert Rutherfurd, 4th Lord Rutherfurd	1685	1724	
Lord Bellenden (1661)	John Bellenden, 2nd Lord Bellenden	1671	1707	
Lord Newark (1661)	David Leslie, 1st Lord Newark	1661	1682	Died
Lord Newark (1661)	David Leslie, 2nd Lord Newark	1682	1694	
Lord Burntisland (1672)	James Wemyss, Lord Burntisland	1672	1682	Died, title extinct
Lord Nairne (1681)	Robert Nairne, 1st Lord Nairne	1681	1683	New creation, died
Lord Nairne (1681)	William Murray, 2nd Lord Nairne	1683	1716	
Lord Churchill of Eyemouth (1682)	John Churchill, 1st Lord Churchill of Eyemouth	1682	1722	New creation; created Earl of Marlborough in the Peerage of England, see above
Lord Kinnaird (1682)	George Kinnaird, 1st Lord Kinnaird	1682	1689	New creation, died
Lord Kinnaird (1682)	Patrick Kinnaird, 2nd Lord Kinnaird	1689	1701	
Lord Glasford (1685)	Francis Abercromby, Lord Glasford	1685	1703	New creation; for life

== Peerage of Ireland ==
Title	Holder	Date gained	Date lost	Notes
Duke of Ormonde (1661)	James Butler, 1st Duke of Ormonde	1661	1688	Died
Duke of Ormonde (1661)	James Butler, 2nd Duke of Ormonde	1688	1715	
Marquess of Antrim (1645)	Randal MacDonnell, 1st Marquess of Antrim	1645	1683	Died, title extinct
Earl of Kildare (1316)	John FitzGerald, 18th Earl of Kildare	1664	1707	
Earl of Waterford (1446)	Charles Talbot, 12th Earl of Waterford	1667	1718	
Earl of Clanricarde (1543)	William Burke, 7th Earl of Clanricarde	1666	1687	Died
Earl of Clanricarde (1543)	Richard Burke, 8th Earl of Clanricarde	1687	1708	
Earl of Thomond (1543)	Henry O'Brien, 7th Earl of Thomond	1657	1691	
Earl of Castlehaven (1616)	James Tuchet, 3rd Earl of Castlehaven	1630	1684	Died
Earl of Castlehaven (1616)	Mervyn Tuchet, 4th Earl of Castlehaven	1684	1686	Died
Earl of Castlehaven (1616)	James Tuchet, 5th Earl of Castlehaven	1686	1700	
Earl of Cork (1620)	Richard Boyle, 2nd Earl of Cork	1643	1698	
Earl of Antrim (1620)	Alexander MacDonnell, 3rd Earl of Antrim	1682	1699	Title previously held by the Marquess of Antrim
Earl of Westmeath (1621)	Richard Nugent, 2nd Earl of Westmeath	1642	1684	Died
Earl of Westmeath (1621)	Richard Nugent, 3rd Earl of Westmeath	1684	1714	
Earl of Roscommon (1622)	Wentworth Dillon, 4th Earl of Roscommon	1649	1685	Died
Earl of Roscommon (1622)	Carey Dillon, 5th Earl of Roscommon	1685	1689	Died
Earl of Roscommon (1622)	Robert Dillon, 6th Earl of Roscommon	1689	1715	
Earl of Londonderry (1622)	Robert Ridgeway, 4th Earl of Londonderry	1672	1714	
Earl of Meath (1627)	William Brabazon, 3rd Earl of Meath	1675	1685	Died
Earl of Meath (1627)	Edward Brabazon, 4th Earl of Meath	1685	1707	
Earl of Barrymore (1628)	Richard Barry, 2nd Earl of Barrymore	1642	1694	
Earl of Carbery (1628)	Richard Vaughan, 2nd Earl of Carbery	1634	1687	Died
Earl of Carbery (1628)	John Vaughan, 3rd Earl of Carbery	1687	1713	
Earl of Fingall (1628)	Luke Plunkett, 3rd Earl of Fingall	1649	1684	Died
Earl of Fingall (1628)	Peter Plunkett, 4th Earl of Fingall	1684	1718	
Earl of Desmond (1628)	William Feilding, 2nd Earl of Desmond	1665	1685	Died
Earl of Desmond (1628)	Basil Feilding, 3rd Earl of Desmond	1685	1717	
Earl of Ardglass (1645)	Thomas Cromwell, 3rd Earl of Ardglass	1668	1682	Died
Earl of Ardglass (1645)	Vere Essex Cromwell, 4th Earl of Ardglass	1682	1687	Died, title extinct
Earl of Donegall (1647)	Arthur Chichester, 3rd Earl of Donegall	1678	1706	
Earl of Cavan (1647)	Richard Lambart, 2nd Earl of Cavan	1660	1690	
Earl of Inchiquin (1654)	William O'Brien, 2nd Earl of Inchiquin	1674	1692	
Earl of Clancarty (1658)	Donough MacCarthy, 4th Earl of Clancarty	1676	1691	
Earl of Orrery (1660)	Roger Boyle, 2nd Earl of Orrery	1679	1682	Died
Earl of Orrery (1660)	Lionel Boyle, 3rd Earl of Orrery	1682	1703	
Earl of Mountrath (1660)	Charles Coote, 3rd Earl of Mountrath	1672	1709	
Earl of Drogheda (1661)	Henry Hamilton-Moore, 3rd Earl of Drogheda	1679	1714	
Earl of Carlingford (1661)	Nicholas Taaffe, 2nd Earl of Carlingford	1677	1690	
Earl of Mount Alexander (1661)	Hugh Montgomery, 2nd Earl of Mount Alexander	1663	1717	
Earl of Castlemaine (1661)	Roger Palmer, 1st Earl of Castlemaine	1661	1705	
Earl of Arran (1662)	Richard Butler, 1st Earl of Arran	1662	1686	Died, title extinct
Earl of Tyrone (1673)	Richard Power, 1st Earl of Tyrone	1673	1690	
Earl of Longford (1677)	Francis Aungier, 1st Earl of Longford	1677	1700	
Earl of Ranelagh (1677)	Richard Jones, 1st Earl of Ranelagh	1677	1711	
Earl of Bellomont (1680)	Charles Kirkhoven, 1st Earl of Bellomont	1680	1683	New creation; died, title extinct
Earl of Granard (1684)	Arthur Forbes, 1st Earl of Granard	1684	1695	New creation
Earl of Tyrconnell (1685)	Richard Talbot, 1st Earl of Tyrconnell	1685	1691	New creation
Earl of Limerick (1686)	William Dongan, 1st Earl of Limerick	1686	1698	New creation
Earl of Bellomont (1689)	Richard Coote, 1st Earl of Bellomont	1683	1701	New creation
Viscount Gormanston (1478)	Jenico Preston, 7th Viscount Gormanston	1643	1691	
Viscount Mountgarret (1550)	Richard Butler, 5th Viscount Mountgarret	1679	1706	
Viscount Grandison (1621)	George Villiers, 4th Viscount Grandison	1661	1699	
Viscount Wilmot (1621)	Henry Wilmot, 3rd Viscount Wilmot	1658	1680	Died
Viscount Wilmot (1621)	Charles Wilmot, 4th Viscount Wilmot	1680	1681	Died, title extinct
Viscount Valentia (1622)	Arthur Annesley, 2nd Viscount Valentia	1660	1686	Died
Viscount Valentia (1622)	James Annesley, 3rd Viscount Valentia	1686	1690	
Viscount Dillon (1622)	Lucas Dillon, 6th Viscount Dillon	1674	1682	Died
Viscount Dillon (1622)	Theobald Dillon, 7th Viscount Dillon	1682	1690	
Viscount Loftus (1622)	Edward Loftus, 2nd Viscount Loftus	1643	1680	Died
Viscount Loftus (1622)	Arthur Loftus, 3rd Viscount Loftus	1680	1725	
Viscount Beaumont of Swords (1622)	Thomas Beaumont, 3rd Viscount Beaumont of Swords	1658	1702	
Viscount Netterville (1622)	Nicholas Netterville, 3rd Viscount Netterville	1659	1689	Died
Viscount Netterville (1622)	John Netterville, 4th Viscount Netterville	1689	1727	
Viscount Magennis (1623)	Arthur Magennis, 3rd Viscount Magennis	1639	1683	Died
Viscount Magennis (1623)	Hugh Magennis, 4th Viscount Magennis	1683	1684	Died
Viscount Magennis (1623)	Bryan Magennis, 5th Viscount Magennis	1684	1692	
Viscount Kilmorey (1625)	Thomas Needham, 6th Viscount Kilmorey	1668	1687	Died
Viscount Kilmorey (1625)	Robert Needham, 7th Viscount Kilmorey	1687	1710	
Viscount Castleton (1627)	George Saunderson, 5th Viscount Castleton	1650	1714	
Viscount Killultagh (1627)	Edward Conway, 3rd Viscount Killultagh	1655	1683	Died, title extinct
Viscount Mayo (1627)	Miles Bourke, 5th Viscount Mayo	1676	1681	Died
Viscount Mayo (1627)	Theobald Bourke, 6th Viscount Mayo	1681	1741	
Viscount Sarsfield (1627)	David Sarsfield, 3rd Viscount Sarsfield	1648	1687	Died
Viscount Sarsfield (1627)	Dominick Sarsfield, 4th Viscount Sarsfield	1687	1691	
Viscount Chaworth (1628)	Patrick Chaworth, 3rd Viscount Chaworth	1644	1693	
Viscount Lumley (1628)	Richard Lumley, 2nd Viscount Lumley	1663	1721	
Viscount Molyneux (1628)	Caryll Molyneux, 3rd Viscount Molyneux	1654	1699	
Viscount Strangford (1628)	Philip Smythe, 2nd Viscount Strangford	1635	1708	
Viscount Scudamore (1628)	John Scudamore, 2nd Viscount Scudamore	1671	1697	
Viscount Wenman (1628)	Philip Wenman, 3rd Viscount Wenman	1665	1686	Died
Viscount Wenman (1628)	Richard Wenman, 4th Viscount Wenman	1686	1690	
Viscount FitzWilliam (1629)	Thomas FitzWilliam, 4th Viscount FitzWilliam	1670	1704	
Viscount Fairfax of Emley (1629)	Charles Fairfax, 5th Viscount Fairfax of Emley	1651	1711	
Viscount Ikerrin (1629)	Pierce Butler, 2nd Viscount Ikerrin	1674	1680	Died
Viscount Ikerrin (1629)	James Butler, 3rd Viscount Ikerrin	1680	1688	Died
Viscount Ikerrin (1629)	Pierce Butler, 4th Viscount Ikerrin	1688	1711	
Viscount Clanmalier (1631)	Lewis O'Dempsey, 2nd Viscount Clanmalier	1638	1683	Died
Viscount Clanmalier (1631)	Maximilian O'Dempsey, 3rd Viscount Clanmalier	1683	1691	
Viscount Cullen (1642)	Brien Cokayne, 2nd Viscount Cullen	1661	1687	Died
Viscount Cullen (1642)	Charles Cokayne, 3rd Viscount Cullen	1687	1688	
Viscount Cullen (1642)	Charles Cokayne, 4th Viscount Cullen	1687	1716	
Viscount Carrington (1643)	Francis Smith, 2nd Viscount Carrington	1665	1701	
Viscount Tracy (1643)	John Tracy, 3rd Viscount Tracy	1662	1687	Died
Viscount Tracy (1643)	William Tracy, 4th Viscount Tracy	1687	1712	
Viscount Bulkeley (1644)	Robert Bulkeley, 2nd Viscount Bulkeley	1659	1688	Died
Viscount Bulkeley (1644)	Richard Bulkeley, 3rd Viscount Bulkeley	1688	1704	
Viscount Brouncker (1645)	William Brouncker, 2nd Viscount Brouncker	1645	1684	Died
Viscount Brouncker (1645)	Henry Brouncker, 3rd Viscount Brouncker	1684	1688	Died, title extinct
Viscount Ogle (1645)	William Ogle, 1st Viscount Ogle	1645	1682	Died, title extinct
Viscount Barnewall (1646)	Henry Barnewall, 2nd Viscount Barnewall	1663	1688	Died
Viscount Barnewall (1646)	Nicholas Barnewall, 3rd Viscount Barnewall	1688	1725	
Viscount Galmoye (1646)	Piers Butler, 3rd Viscount of Galmoye	1667	1697	
Viscount Massereene (1660)	John Skeffington, 2nd Viscount Massereene	1665	1695	
Viscount Shannon (1660)	Francis Boyle, 1st Viscount Shannon	1660	1699	
Viscount Fanshawe (1661)	Evelyn Fanshawe, 3rd Viscount Fanshawe	1674	1687	Died
Viscount Fanshawe (1661)	Charles Fanshawe, 4th Viscount Fanshawe	1687	1710	
Viscount Cholmondeley (1661)	Robert Cholmondeley, 1st Viscount Cholmondeley	1661	1681	Died
Viscount Cholmondeley (1661)	Hugh Cholmondeley, 2nd Viscount Cholmondeley	1681	1725	
Viscount Dungan (1662)	William Dongan, 1st Viscount Dungan	1662	1698	Created Earl of Limerick, see above
Viscount Dungannon (1662)	Lewis Trevor, 2nd Viscount Dungannon	1670	1693	
Viscount Clare (1662)	Daniel O'Brien, 3rd Viscount Clare	1670	1691	
Viscount Fitzhardinge (1663)	Maurice Berkeley, 3rd Viscount Fitzhardinge	1668	1690	
Viscount Charlemont (1665)	William Caulfeild, 2nd Viscount Charlemont	1671	1726	
Viscount Powerscourt (1665)	Folliott Wingfield, 1st Viscount Powerscourt	1665	1717	
Viscount Blesington (1673)	Murrough Boyle, 1st Viscount Blesington	1673	1718	
Viscount Granard (1675)	Arthur Forbes, 1st Viscount Granard	1675	1695	Created Earl of Granard, see above
Viscount Lanesborough (1676)	George Lane, 1st Viscount Lanesborough	1676	1683	Died
Viscount Lanesborough (1676)	James Lane, 2nd Viscount Lanesborough	1683	1724	
Viscount Downe (1680)	John Dawnay, 1st Viscount Downe	1680	1695	New creation
Viscount Rosse (1681)	Richard Parsons, 1st Viscount Rosse	1681	1703	New creation
Viscount Mountjoy (1683)	William Stewart, 1st Viscount Mountjoy	1683	1692	New creation
Viscount Lisburne (1685)	Adam Loftus, 1st Viscount Lisburne	1685	1691	New creation
Viscount Galway (1687)	Ulick Bourke, 1st Viscount Galway	1687	1691	New creation
Viscount Hewett (1687)	George Hewett, 1st Viscount Hewett	1689	1689	New creation; died, title extinct
Baron Athenry (1172)	Edward Bermingham, 13th Baron Athenry	1677	1709	
Baron Kingsale (1223)	Almericus de Courcy, 23rd Baron Kingsale	1669	1720	
Baron Kerry (1223)	William Fitzmaurice, 20th Baron Kerry	1661	1697	
Baron Slane (1370)	Christopher Fleming, 17th Baron Slane	1676	1691	
Baron Howth (1425)	Thomas St Lawrence, 13th Baron Howth	1671	1727	
Baron Trimlestown (1461)	Robert Barnewall, 9th Baron Trimlestown	1667	1689	Died
Baron Trimlestown (1461)	Matthias Barnewall, 10th Baron Trimlestown	1689	1692	
Baron Dunsany (1462)	Christopher Plunkett, 10th Baron of Dunsany	1668	1690	
Baron Dunboyne (1541)	Pierce Butler, 5th/15th Baron Dunboyne	1662	1690	
Baron Louth (1541)	Matthew Plunkett, 7th Baron Louth	1679	1689	Outlawed
Baron Upper Ossory (1541)	Barnaby Fitzpatrick, 7th Baron Upper Ossory	1666	1691	
Baron Bourke of Castleconnell (1580)	Thomas Bourke, 7th Baron Bourke of Connell	1665	1680	Died
Baron Bourke of Castleconnell (1580)	William Bourke, 8th Baron Bourke of Connell	1680	1691	
Baron Cahir (1583)	Theobald Butler, 5th Baron Cahir	1676	1700	
Baron Hamilton (1617)	Claud Hamilton, 5th Baron Hamilton of Strabane	1668	1691	
Baron Bourke of Brittas (1618)	Theobald Bourke, 3rd Baron Bourke of Brittas	1668	1691	
Baron Castle Stewart (1619)	John Stewart, 5th Baron Castle Stewart	1662	1685	Died
Baron Castle Stewart (1619)	Robert Stewart, 6th Baron Castle Stewart	1685	1686	Died; title dormant
Baron Folliot (1620)	Thomas Folliott, 2nd Baron Folliott	1622	1697	
Baron Maynard (1620)	William Maynard, 2nd Baron Maynard	1640	1699	
Baron Gorges of Dundalk (1620)	Richard Gorges, 2nd Baron Gorges of Dundalk	1650	1712	
Baron Digby (1620)	Simon Digby, 4th Baron Digby	1677	1685	Died
Baron Digby (1620)	William Digby, 5th Baron Digby	1685	1752	
Baron Fitzwilliam (1620)	William Fitzwilliam, 3rd Baron Fitzwilliam	1658	1719	
Baron Blayney (1621)	Henry Vincent Blayney, 5th Baron Blayney	1670	1689	Died
Baron Blayney (1621)	William Blayney, 6th Baron Blayney	1689	1705	
Baron Brereton (1624)	William Brereton, 3rd Baron Brereton	1664	1680	Died
Baron Brereton (1624)	John Brereton, 4th Baron Brereton	1680	1718	
Baron Herbert of Castle Island (1624)	Henry Herbert, 4th Baron Herbert of Castle Island	1678	1691	
Baron Baltimore (1625)	Charles Calvert, 3rd Baron Baltimore	1675	1715	
Baron Coleraine (1625)	Henry Hare, 2nd Baron Coleraine	1667	1708	
Baron Sherard (1627)	Bennet Sherard, 2nd Baron Sherard	1640	1700	
Baron Alington (1642)	William Alington, 3rd Baron Alington	1659	1685	Died
Baron Alington (1642)	Giles Alington, 4th Baron Alington	1685	1691	
Baron Hawley (1646)	Francis Hawley, 1st Baron Hawley	1646	1684	Died
Baron Hawley (1646)	Francis Hawley, 2nd Baron Hawley	1684	1743	
Baron Kingston (1660)	Robert King, 2nd Baron Kingston	1676	1693	
Baron Coote (1660)	Richard Coote, 1st Baron Coote	1660	1683	Died
Baron Coote (1660)	Richard Coote, 2nd Baron Coote	1683	1701	Created Earl of Bellomont, see above
Baron Barry of Santry (1661)	Richard Barry, 2nd Baron Barry of Santry	1673	1694	
Baron Hamilton of Glenawly (1661)	William Hamilton, 2nd Baron Hamilton of Glenawly	1679	1680	Died, title extinct
Baron Altham (1681)	Altham Annesley, 1st Baron Altham	1681	1699	New creation
Baron Bellew of Duleek (1686)	John Bellew, 1st Baron Bellew of Duleek	1686	1693	New creation
Baron Shelburne (1688)	Elizabeth Petty, Baroness Shelburne	1688	1708	New creation
Baron Shelburne (1688)	Charles Petty, 1st Baron Shelburne	1688	1696	New creation

Preceded by List of peers 1670–1679	Lists of peers by decade 1680–1689	Succeeded by List of peers 1690–1699
