= John Willoughby, 9th Baron Willoughby of Parham =

John Willoughby, 9th Baron Willoughby of Parham (1643–1678) was an English peer of the House of Lords.

He was born in Stanstead Bury, near Stanstead Abbotts, Hertfordshire, England on 29 December 1643, the son of William Willoughby, 6th Baron Willoughby of Parham and Anne Carey. He married Anne Bolterton (died circa 3 October 1683). On the death of his nephew John in early 1678, he succeeded as the 9th Baron Willoughby of Parham. However, a few months later he died without issue in September 1678. The barony was succeeded by his younger brother, Charles Willoughby.

== Bibliography ==
- Burke, John (1831), A General and Heraldic Dictionary of the Peerage of England, Ireland and Scotland, London: Henry Colburn and Richard Bentley.

Peerage of England
Preceded by John Willoughby	Baron Willoughby of Parham; 1678	Succeeded by Charles Willoughby
