= George Willoughby, 7th Baron Willoughby of Parham =

English Baron

George Willoughby, 7th Baron Willoughby of Parham (1638–1674) was an English peer of the House of Lords.

He was born at Belvoir Castle, Leicestershire, England on 18 March 1639, the son of William Willoughby, 6th Baron Willoughby of Parham and Anne Carey. On 9 October 1666, he married Elizabeth Clinton, daughter of Henry Clinton and Jane Markham. George and Elizabeth had three children: John Willoughby, 8th Baron Willoughby of Parham, his successor; Anne, who died in infancy; and Elizabeth, who married Hon. James Bertie, son of James Bertie, 1st Earl of Abingdon. On the death of his father in 1673, he succeeded as the 7th Baron Willoughby of Parham. He died in Knaith, Lincolnshire, England in 1674, aged 35.

== Bibliography ==
- Burke, John (1831), A General and Heraldic Dictionary of the Peerage of England, Ireland and Scotland, London: Henry Colburn and Richard Bentley.

Peerage of England
Preceded by William Willoughby	Baron Willoughby of Parham; 1673–1674	Succeeded by John Willoughby
