= John Willoughby, 8th Baron Willoughby of Parham =

English House of Lords peer (1669–1678)

John Willoughby, 8th Baron Willoughby of Parham (1669–1678) was an English peer of the House of Lords.

He was born on 16 July 1669, the son of George Willoughby, 7th Baron Willoughby of Parham and Elizabeth Fiennes. On the death of his father in 1674, he succeeded as the 8th Baron Willoughby of Parham. However, he did not enjoy the title long, dying in early 1678. The barony was succeeded by his uncle, John Willoughby.

== Bibliography ==
- Burke, John (1831), A General and Heraldic Dictionary of the Peerage of England, Ireland and Scotland, London: Henry Colburn and Richard Bentley.

Peerage of England
Preceded by George Willoughby	Baron Willoughby of Parham; 1674–1678	Succeeded by John Willoughby
