= Lord Rutherfurd =

Title

The title of Lord Rutherfurd was a Lordship of Parliament in the Peerage of Scotland.

It was created on 19 January 1661 for the soldier Andrew Rutherfurd, with remainder to the heirs male of his body, failing which to his heirs of tailzie. He was further created Earl of Teviot on 2 February 1663, with remainder to the heirs male of his body. He was killed while serving as Governor of Tangier on 3 May 1664, when the earldom became extinct and the lordship passed to his kinsman Sir Thomas Rutherfurd of Hunthill. He was in turn succeeded by his brothers Archibald and Robert. The third Lord's ill-fated engagement to Janet Dalrymple, daughter of James Dalrymple, 1st Viscount of Stair, was the inspiration for Sir Walter Scott's 1819 novel The Bride of Lammermoor. The lordship became dormant on the death of the fourth Lord in 1724, but was still being claimed as late as 1839.

== Lords Rutherfurd (1661) ==
- Andrew Rutherfurd (died 1664; also Earl of Teviot from 1663)
- Thomas Rutherfurd, 2nd Lord Rutherfurd (died 1668)
- Archibald Rutherfurd, 3rd Lord Rutherfurd (died 1685)
- Robert Rutherfurd, 4th Lord Rutherfurd (died 1724)

== Law Lords ==
- Andrew Rutherfurd, Lord Rutherfurd
