= Matthew Plunkett, 7th Baron Louth =

Matthew Plunkett, 7th Baron Louth (died September 1689) was an Irish Jacobite soldier and peer.

Louth was the son of Oliver Plunkett, 6th Baron Louth, and Lady Mary Dillon, the daughter of Randal MacDonnell, 1st Earl of Antrim. In 1679 he succeeded to his father's peerage and assumed his seat in the Irish House of Lords. In 1685 he received a commission from James II of England in the Irish Army and in 1687 became the colonel of a regiment of foot, Lord Louth's Regiment. That same year he was appointed Lord Lieutenant of Louth and Drogheda.

Louth participated in the Williamite War in Ireland on the side of James II, and commanded the mortars at the Siege of Derry in 1689. He was among those sworn of the Privy Council of Ireland on James' arrival in Ireland in March 1689 and he participated in the Patriot Parliament the same year. He was declared an outlaw by the government of William III of England, but had died by September 1689.

On 4 February 1664 he married Jane Fitzgerald, daughter of Sir Luke Fitzgerald, by whom he had two sons and four daughters. Louth's great-great-grandson, the eleventh Baron, managed to obtain a reversal of the outlawry and was restored to the title.

Peerage of Ireland
Preceded by Oliver Plunkett	Baron Louth; 1679–1689	Succeeded by Oliver Plunkett
