= William Willoughby, 6th Baron Willoughby of Parham =

English landowner and politician

William Willoughby, 6th Lord Willoughby (c. 1616 – 10 April 1673) was an English landowner and politician who sat in the House of Commons and later in the House of Lords. In 1666 he inherited the peerage of Baron Willoughby of Parham, and from 1667 he served as Governor of Barbados (1667 – 1673).

Willoughby was the third son of William Willoughby, 3rd Baron Willoughby of Parham, and his wife Lady Frances Manners, daughter of John Manners, 4th Earl of Rutland. He was educated at Eton College from 1623 to 1624. In 1636 he travelled abroad in Italy. He was a student of the Middle Temple in 1652.

In 1660 Willoughby was elected a Member of Parliament for Midhurst in the Convention Parliament. He was commissioner for plantations from December 1660 until 1667. On the death in 1666 of his brother Francis Willoughby, 5th Lord Willoughby of Parham, who died without a male heir, he succeeded to his hereditary peerage and to his seat in the House of Lords. From 1667 until his death he was Governor of Barbados, revisiting England occasionally and retaining his other offices.

Willoughby died in Barbados in 1673, and his body was brought back to Lincolnshire, to be buried at Knaith.

Willoughby married Anne, daughter of Philip Cary (MP for Woodstock) of Aldenham, Hertfordshire, by 1637. They had a daughter, Frances, who married Charles Kirkhoven, 1st Earl of Bellomont.

Peerage of England
Preceded by Francis Willoughby	Baron Willoughby of Parham; 1666–1673	Succeeded by George Willoughby
