= Alexander Stuart, 5th Lord Blantyre =

Alexander Stuart, 5th Lord Blantyre (or Stewart) (died 1704) was a Scottish nobleman, a soldier and politician.

== Life ==
He was the son of Alexander Stewart, 4th Lord Blantyre, by Margaret, daughter of John Shaw of Greenock. At the Glorious Revolution he raised a regiment for the service of King William, which was at Stirling when Hugh Mackay was encamped at Killiecrankie. For his loyalty he received a pension from the king.

Stewart was one of those who protested against the meeting of the convention of 9 June 1702, and seceded from the meeting. By the seceding members he was sent as a deputy to Anne, Queen of Great Britain, who declined to accept their protest, but permitted Stewart to wait on her.

Stewart took the oath and his seat in the Scottish parliament on 9 July 1703. On 11 August a complaint was made against him by the Lord Advocate for having, before witnesses, called the Lord High Commissioner "a base and impudent liar". He entered the house while the debate was in progress, and having put himself in the lord constable's hands, was placed under arrest in his own chamber. On the 13th a petition from him was read, asking the commissioner and the estates to accept his humble apology. It was agreed that before his liberation he should on his knees crave pardon of the commissioner and the estates, and submit to a fine; but on his being called in the commissioner dispensed with his making acknowledgments on his knees, and, having promised obedience to the remainder of the sentence, he was dismissed from the bar and reinstated.

Stewart died on 20 June 1704.

== Family ==
By his first wife, Margaret, eldest daughter of Sir John Henderson of Fordel, Fife, bart., he had no issue. By his second wife, Anne, daughter of Sir Robert Hamilton, Lord Pressmennan, and sister of John Hamilton, 2nd Lord Belhaven and Stenton, he had five sons and four daughters:

- Walter (d. 1713), sixth lord;
- Robert (d. 1743), seventh lord;
- John, James, Hugh;
- Marion, married to James Stirling of Keir;
- Frances to Sir James Hamilton of Rosehall, bart.;
- Helen to John Gray, 11th Lord Gray; and
- Anne to Alexander Hay of Drummelzie.

== Notes ==
Attribution

This article incorporates text from a publication now in the public domain: Lee, Sidney, ed. (1898). "Stewart, Alexander (d.1704)". Dictionary of National Biography. Vol. 54. London: Smith, Elder & Co.

Peerage of Scotland
Preceded by Alexander Stewart	Lord Blantyre; 1670–1704	Succeeded by Walter Stuart
