= Charles Kirkhoven, 1st Earl of Bellomont =

Dutch-born Irish peer (1643–1683)

Charles Henry Kirkhoven, 1st Earl of Bellomont (9 May 1643, The Hague – 1683) was a Dutch-born Irish peer, known as Lord Wotton from 1649 to 1680.

Kirkhoven (the anglicised form of van der Kerckhove) was the only son of Jehan, Lord of Heenvliet and his wife, Katherine (1609–1667) (later created Countess of Chesterfield), both courtiers in the Princess of Orange's household.

In 1649, Charles II created him Baron Wotton, a title which became extinct upon the death of his maternal grandfather in 1630. From 1659 to 1674, he was Chief Magistrate of Breda and was granted a troop of horses by the States-General. On the death of his father in 1660, he took over the former's offices in the Princess's household and was also granted a post in the household of her son, Prince William (later William III of England).

In 1660, following the restoration of Charles II to the English throne, Wotton and his sister Emilia were naturalised as English by Act of Parliament.

In 1663, Lord Wotton took his seat in the House of Lords and on his mother's death four years later, he inherited her Belsize House estate in Belsize Park. On 25 August 1679, he married Hon. Frances Harpur, daughter of William Willoughby, 6th Baron Willoughby of Parham. In 1680, he was created Earl of Bellomont. He died in 1683 of an apoplexy and was buried in Canterbury Cathedral. As he had no surviving children, his titles became extinct and he left his estate to Hon. Charles Stanhope (the youngest son of his half-brother, the 2nd Earl of Chesterfield), who later changed his surname to Wotton.

== Coat of arms ==
Coat of arms of Charles Kirkhoven, 1st Earl of Bellomont
Coronet A coronet of an Earl Crest A demi negress couped at the waist in profile proper wreathed around the temples azure and argent winged of the last. Escutcheon Argent three hearts gules. Supporters Dexter: a dragon sans wings vert; Sinister: a buck ermine armed and winged or.
