= List of peers 1690–1699 =

This page lists all peers who held extant titles between 1690 and 1699.

== Peerage of England ==
Title	Holder	Date gained	Date lost	Notes
Duke of Cornwall (1337)	Prince James Francis Edward	1688	1702	
Duke of Norfolk (1483)	Henry Howard, 7th Duke of Norfolk	1684	1701	
Duke of Somerset (1547)	Charles Seymour, 6th Duke of Somerset	1678	1748	
Duke of Newcastle-upon-Tyne (1665)	Henry Cavendish, 2nd Duke of Newcastle-upon-Tyne	1676	1691	Died
Duke of Cleveland (1670)	Barbara Palmer, 1st Duchess of Cleveland	1670	1709	
Duke of Portsmouth (1673)	Louise de Kérouaille, Duchess of Portsmouth	1673	1734	
Duke of Richmond (1675)	Charles Lennox, 1st Duke of Richmond	1675	1723	
Duke of Southampton (1675)	Charles Fitzroy, 1st Duke of Southampton	1675	1730	
Duke of Grafton (1675)	Henry FitzRoy, 1st Duke of Grafton	1675	1690	Died
Duke of Grafton (1675)	Charles FitzRoy, 2nd Duke of Grafton	1690	1757	
Duke of Ormonde (1682)	James Butler, 1st Duke of Ormonde	1682	1715	
Duke of Beaufort (1682)	Henry Somerset, 1st Duke of Beaufort	1682	1700	
Duke of Northumberland (1683)	George FitzRoy, 1st Duke of Northumberland	1683	1716	
Duke of St Albans (1684)	Charles Beauclerk, 1st Duke of St Albans	1684	1726	
Duke of Berwick (1687)	James FitzJames, 1st Duke of Berwick	1687	1695	Attainted, and his honours were forfeited
Duke of Cumberland (1689)	Prince George, Duke of Cumberland	1689	1708	
Duke of Bolton (1689)	Charles Paulet, 1st Duke of Bolton	1689	1699	Died
Duke of Bolton (1689)	Charles Paulet, 2nd Duke of Bolton	1699	1722	
Duke of Schomberg (1689)	Frederick Schomberg, 1st Duke of Schomberg	1689	1690	Died
Duke of Schomberg (1689)	Charles Schomberg, 2nd Duke of Schomberg	1690	1693	Died
Duke of Schomberg (1689)	Meinhardt Schomberg, 3rd Duke of Schomberg	1693	1719	
Duke of Shrewsbury (1694)	Charles Talbot, 1st Duke of Shrewsbury	1694	1718	New creation
Duke of Leeds (1694)	Thomas Osborne, 1st Duke of Leeds	1694	1712	New creation for the 1st Marquess of Carmarthen
Duke of Bedford (1694)	William Russell, 1st Duke of Bedford	1694	1700	New creation
Duke of Devonshire (1694)	William Cavendish, 1st Duke of Devonshire	1694	1707	New creation
Duke of Newcastle-upon-Tyne (1694)	John Holles, 1st Duke of Newcastle-upon-Tyne	1694	1711	New creation
Marquess of Halifax (1682)	George Savile, 1st Marquess of Halifax	1682	1695	Died
Marquess of Halifax (1682)	William Savile, 2nd Marquess of Halifax	1695	1700	
Marquess of Powis (1687)	William Herbert, 1st Marquess of Powis	1687	1696	Died
Marquess of Powis (1687)	William Herbert, 2nd Marquess of Powis	1696	1745	
Marquess of Normanby (1694)	John Sheffield, 1st Marquess of Normanby	1694	1721	New creation
Earl of Oxford (1142)	Aubrey de Vere, 20th Earl of Oxford	1632	1703	
Earl of Shrewsbury (1442)	Charles Talbot, 12th Earl of Shrewsbury	1668	1718	Created Duke of Shrewsbery, see above
Earl of Kent (1465)	Anthony Grey, 11th Earl of Kent	1651	1702	
Earl of Derby (1485)	William Stanley, 9th Earl of Derby	1672	1702	
Earl of Rutland (1525)	John Manners, 9th Earl of Rutlan	1679	1711	
Earl of Huntingdon (1529)	Theophilus Hastings, 7th Earl of Huntingdon	1656	1701	
Earl of Bedford (1550)	William Russell, 5th Earl of Bedford	1641	1700	Created Duke of Bedford, see above
Earl of Pembroke (1551)	Thomas Herbert, 8th Earl of Pembroke	1683	1733	
Earl of Devon (1553)	William Courtenay, de jure 5th Earl of Devon	1638	1702	
Earl of Lincoln (1572)	Edward Clinton, 5th Earl of Lincoln	1667	1692	Died
Earl of Lincoln (1572)	Francis Clinton, 6th Earl of Lincoln	1692	1693	Died
Earl of Lincoln (1572)	Henry Clinton, 7th Earl of Lincoln	1693	1728	
Earl of Suffolk (1603)	George Howard, 4th Earl of Suffolk	1689	1691	Died
Earl of Suffolk (1603)	Henry Howard, 5th Earl of Suffolk	1691	1709	
Earl of Dorset (1604)	Charles Sackville, 6th Earl of Dorset	1677	1706	
Earl of Exeter (1605)	John Cecil, 5th Earl of Exeter	1678	1700	
Earl of Salisbury (1605)	James Cecil, 4th Earl of Salisbury	1683	1694	Died
Earl of Salisbury (1605)	James Cecil, 5th Earl of Salisbury	1694	1728	
Earl of Bridgewater (1617)	John Egerton, 3rd Earl of Bridgewater	1686	1701	
Earl of Northampton (1618)	George Compton, 4th Earl of Northampton	1681	1727	
Earl of Leicester (1618)	Philip Sidney, 3rd Earl of Leicester	1677	1698	Died
Earl of Leicester (1618)	Robert Sidney, 4th Earl of Leicester	1698	1702	
Earl of Warwick (1618)	Edward Rich, 6th Earl of Warwick	1675	1701	
Earl of Devonshire (1618)	William Cavendish, 4th Earl of Devonshire	1684	1707	Created Duke of Devonshire, see above
Earl of Denbigh (1622)	Basil Feilding, 4th Earl of Denbigh	1685	1717	
Earl of Bristol (1622)	John Digby, 3rd Earl of Bristol	1677	1698	Died, title extinct
Earl of Clare (1624)	John Holles, 4th Earl of Clare	1689	1711	Created Duke of Newcastle-upon-Tyne, see above
Earl of Bolingbroke (1624)	Paulet St John, 3rd Earl of Bolingbroke	1688	1711	
Earl of Westmorland (1624)	Charles Fane, 3rd Earl of Westmorland	1666	1691	Died
Earl of Westmorland (1624)	Vere Fane, 4th Earl of Westmorland	1691	1693	Died
Earl of Westmorland (1624)	Vere Fane, 5th Earl of Westmorland	1693	1699	Died
Earl of Westmorland (1624)	Thomas Fane, 6th Earl of Westmorland	1699	1736	
Earl of Manchester (1626)	Charles Montagu, 4th Earl of Manchester	1683	1722	
Earl of Mulgrave (1626)	John Sheffield, 3rd Earl of Mulgrave	1658	1721	Created Marquess of Normanby, see above
Earl of Berkshire (1626)	Thomas Howard, 3rd Earl of Berkshire	1679	1706	
Earl Rivers (1626)	Thomas Savage, 3rd Earl Rivers	1654	1694	Died
Earl Rivers (1626)	Richard Savage, 4th Earl Rivers	1694	1712	
Earl of Lindsey (1626)	Robert Bertie, 3rd Earl of Lindsey	1666	1701	
Earl of Peterborough (1628)	Henry Mordaunt, 2nd Earl of Peterborough	1643	1697	Died
Earl of Peterborough (1628)	Charles Mordaunt, 3rd Earl of Peterborough	1697	1735	
Earl of Stamford (1628)	Thomas Grey, 2nd Earl of Stamford	1673	1720	
Earl of Winchilsea (1628)	Charles Finch, 4th Earl of Winchilsea	1689	1712	
Earl of Kingston-upon-Hull (1628)	William Pierrepont, 4th Earl of Kingston-upon-Hull	1682	1690	Died
Earl of Kingston-upon-Hull (1628)	Evelyn Pierrepont, 5th Earl of Kingston-upon-Hull	1690	1726	
Earl of Carnarvon (1628)	Charles Dormer, 2nd Earl of Carnarvon	1643	1709	
Earl of Chesterfield (1628)	Philip Stanhope, 2nd Earl of Chesterfield	1656	1714	
Earl of Thanet (1628)	Thomas Tufton, 6th Earl of Thanet	1684	1729	
Earl of Strafford (1640)	William Wentworth, 2nd Earl of Strafford	1662	1695	Died, title extinct; Barony of Raby succeeded by a cousin, see below
Earl of Sunderland (1643)	Robert Spencer, 2nd Earl of Sunderland	1643	1702	
Earl of Scarsdale (1645)	Robert Leke, 3rd Earl of Scarsdale	1681	1707	
Earl of Sandwich (1660)	Edward Montagu, 3rd Earl of Sandwich	1688	1729	
Earl of Anglesey (1661)	James Annesley, 2nd Earl of Anglesey	1686	1690	Died
Earl of Anglesey (1661)	James Annesley, 3rd Earl of Anglesey	1690	1702	
Earl of Bath (1661)	John Granville, 1st Earl of Bath	1661	1701	
Earl of Cardigan (1661)	Robert Brudenell, 2nd Earl of Cardigan	1663	1703	
Earl of Clarendon (1661)	Henry Hyde, 2nd Earl of Clarendon	1674	1709	
Earl of Essex (1661)	Algernon Capell, 2nd Earl of Essex	1683	1710	
Earl of Carlisle (1661)	Edward Howard, 2nd Earl of Carlisle	1685	1692	Died
Earl of Carlisle (1661)	Charles Howard, 3rd Earl of Carlisle	1692	1738	
Earl of Craven (1664)	William Craven, 1st Earl of Craven	1664	1697	Died, title extinct
Earl of Ailesbury (1664)	Thomas Bruce, 2nd Earl of Ailesbury	1685	1741	Earl of Elgin in the Peerage of Scotland
Earl of Burlington (1664)	Richard Boyle, 1st Earl of Burlington	1664	1698	Earl of Cork in the Peerage of Ireland
Earl of Burlington (1664)	Charles Boyle, 2nd Earl of Burlington	1698	1704	Earl of Cork in the Peerage of Ireland
Earl of Arlington (1672)	Isabella Fitzroy, 2nd Countess of Arlington	1685	1723	
Earl of Shaftesbury (1672)	Anthony Ashley-Cooper, 2nd Earl of Shaftesbury	1683	1699	Died
Earl of Shaftesbury (1672)	Anthony Ashley-Cooper, 3rd Earl of Shaftesbury	1699	1713	
Earl of Lichfield (1674)	Edward Lee, 1st Earl of Lichfield	1674	1716	
Earl of Sussex (1674)	Thomas Lennard, 1st Earl of Sussex	1674	1715	
Earl of Feversham (1676)	Louis de Duras, 2nd Earl of Feversham	1677	1709	
Earl of Radnor (1679)	Charles Robartes, 2nd Earl of Radnor	1685	1723	
Earl of Macclesfield (1679)	Charles Gerard, 1st Earl of Macclesfield	1679	1694	Died
Earl of Macclesfield (1679)	Charles Gerard, 2nd Earl of Macclesfield	1695	1701	
Earl of Yarmouth (1679)	William Paston, 2nd Earl of Yarmouth	1683	1732	
Earl of Berkeley (1679)	George Berkeley, 1st Earl of Berkeley	1679	1698	Died
Earl of Berkeley (1679)	Charles Berkeley, 2nd Earl of Berkeley	1698	1710	
Earl of Nottingham (1681)	Daniel Finch, 2nd Earl of Nottingham	1682	1730	
Earl of Rochester (1682)	Laurence Hyde, 1st Earl of Rochester	1682	1711	
Earl of Abingdon (1682)	James Bertie, 1st Earl of Abingdon	1682	1699	Died
Earl of Abingdon (1682)	Montagu Venables-Bertie, 2nd Earl of Abingdon	1699	1743	
Earl of Gainsborough (1682)	Wriothesley Noel, 2nd Earl of Gainsborough	1689	1690	
Earl of Gainsborough (1682)	Baptist Noel, 3rd Earl of Gainsborough	1690	1714	
Earl of Plymouth (1682)	Other Windsor, 2nd Earl of Plymouth	1687	1727	
Earl of Holderness (1682)	Conyers Darcy, 2nd Earl of Holderness	1689	1692	Died
Earl of Holderness (1682)	Robert Darcy, 3rd Earl of Holderness	1692	1721	
Earl of Dorchester (1686)	Catherine Sedley, Countess of Dorchester	1686	1717	
Earl of Derwentwater (1688)	Francis Radclyffe, 1st Earl of Derwentwater	1688	1697	Died
Earl of Derwentwater (1688)	Edward Radclyffe, 2nd Earl of Derwentwater	1697	1705	
Earl of Stafford (1688)	Mary Stafford, Countess of Stafford	1688	1694	Died, title extinct
Earl of Stafford (1688)	Henry Stafford Howard, 1st Earl of Stafford	1688	1719	
Earl of Fauconberg (1689)	Thomas Belasyse, 1st Earl Fauconberg	1689	1700	
Earl of Marlborough (1689)	John Churchill, 1st Earl of Marlborough	1689	1722	
Earl of Montagu (1689)	Ralph Montagu, 1st Earl of Montagu	1689	1709	
Earl of Portland (1689)	William Bentinck, 1st Earl of Portland	1689	1709	
Earl of Monmouth (1689)	Charles Mordaunt, 1st Earl of Monmouth	1689	1735	Succeeded to the more senior Earldom of Peterborough, see above
Earl of Torrington (1689)	Arthur Herbert, 1st Earl of Torrington	1689	1716	
Earl of Warrington (1690)	Henry Booth, 1st Earl of Warrington	1690	1694	New creation; died
Earl of Warrington (1690)	George Booth, 2nd Earl of Warrington	1694	1758	
Earl of Scarbrough (1690)	Richard Lumley, 1st Earl of Scarbrough	1690	1721	New creation
Earl of Bradford (1694)	Francis Newport, 1st Earl of Bradford	1694	1708	New creation
Earl of Romney (1694)	Henry Sydney, 1st Earl of Romney	1694	1704	New creation
Earl of Rochford (1695)	William Nassau de Zuylestein, 1st Earl of Rochford	1695	1708	New creation
Earl of Tankerville (1695)	Ford Grey, 1st Earl of Tankerville	1695	1701	New creation
Earl of Albemarle (1697)	Arnold van Keppel, 1st Earl of Albemarle	1697	1718	New creation
Earl of Coventry (1697)	Thomas Coventry, 1st Earl of Coventry	1697	1697	New creation; died
Earl of Coventry (1697)	Thomas Coventry, 2nd Earl of Coventry	1699	1710	
Earl of Orford (1697)	Edward Russell, 1st Earl of Orford	1697	1727	New creation
Earl of Jersey (1697)	Edward Villiers, 1st Earl of Jersey	1697	1711	New creation; Viscount Villiers in 1691
Earl of Grantham (1698)	Henry de Nassau d'Auverquerque, 1st Earl of Grantham	1698	1754	New creation
Viscount Hereford (1550)	Edward Devereux, 8th Viscount Hereford	1683	1700	
Viscount Montagu (1554)	Francis Browne, 4th Viscount Montagu	1682	1708	
Viscount Saye and Sele (1624)	William Fiennes, 3rd Viscount Saye and Sele	1674	1698	Died
Viscount Saye and Sele (1624)	Nathaniel Fiennes, 4th Viscount Saye and Sele	1698	1710	
Viscount Bayning of Newport (1675)	Francis Newport, 1st Viscount Newport	1675	1708	Created Earl of Bradford, see above
Viscount Hatton (1682)	Christopher Hatton, 1st Viscount Hatton	1682	1706	
Viscount Townshend (1682)	Charles Townshend, 2nd Viscount Townshend	1687	1738	
Viscount Weymouth (1682)	Thomas Thynne, 1st Viscount Weymouth	1682	1714	
Viscount Lumley (1689)	Richard Lumley, 1st Viscount Lumley	1689	1721	Created Earl of Scarbrough, see above
Viscount Sydney (1689)	Henry Sydney, 1st Viscount Sydney	1689	1704	Created Earl of Romney, see above
Viscount de Longueville (1690)	Henry Yelverton, 1st Viscount Longueville	1690	1704	New creation
Viscount Lonsdale (1690)	John Lowther, 1st Viscount Lonsdale	1699	1700	New creation
Baron FitzWalter (1295)	Charles Mildmay, 18th Baron FitzWalter	1679	1728	
Baron Ferrers of Chartley (1299)	Robert Shirley, 14th Baron Ferrers of Chartley	1677	1717	
Baron Morley (1299)	Thomas Parker, 15th Baron Morley	1655	1697	Died, Barony fell into abeyance
Baron Grey of Ruthyn (1325)	Henry Yelverton, 15th Baron Grey of Ruthyn	1679	1704	Created Viscount Longueville in 1690, Barony held by his heirs until 1799
Baron Dudley (1440)	Frances Ward, 6th Baroness Dudley	1643	1697	Died
Baron Dudley (1440)	Edward Ward, 7th Baron Dudley	1697	1701	
Baron Stourton (1448)	Edward Stourton, 13th Baron Stourton	1685	1720	
Baron Willoughby de Broke (1491)	Richard Verney, 11th Baron Willoughby de Broke	1683	1711	
Baron Monteagle (1514)	Thomas Parker, 6th Baron Monteagle	1655	1697	Died, Barony fell into abeyance
Baron Wentworth (1529)	Anne Lovelace, 7th Baroness Wentworth	1686	1697	Died
Baron Wentworth (1529)	Martha Johnson, 8th Baroness Wentworth	1697	1745	
Baron Mordaunt (1532)	Mary Howard, 7th Baroness Mordaunt	1697	1705	Barony previously held by the Earls of Peterborough
Baron Eure (1544)	Ralph Eure, 7th Baron Eure	1672	1707	
Baron Wharton (1545)	Philip Wharton, 4th Baron Wharton	1625	1695	Died
Baron Wharton (1545)	Thomas Wharton, 5th Baron Wharton	1695	1715	
Baron Willoughby of Parham (1547)	Henry Willoughby, de jure 12th Baron Willoughby of Parham	1685	1722	
Baron Paget (1552)	William Paget, 6th Baron Paget	1678	1713	
Baron North (1554)	Charles North, 5th Baron North	1677	1691	Died
Baron North (1554)	William North, 6th Baron North	1691	1734	
Baron Howard of Effingham (1554)	Francis Howard, 5th Baron Howard of Effingham	1681	1695	Died
Baron Howard of Effingham (1554)	Thomas Howard, 6th Baron Howard of Effingham	1695	1725	
Baron Chandos (1554)	James Brydges, 8th Baron Chandos	1676	1714	
Baron Hunsdon (1559)	Robert Carey, 6th Baron Hunsdon	1677	1692	Died
Baron Hunsdon (1559)	Robert Carey, 7th Baron Hunsdon	1692	1702	
Baron De La Warr (1570)	John West, 6th Baron De La Warr	1687	1723	
Baron Gerard (1603)	Charles Gerard, 6th Baron Gerard	1684	1707	
Baron Petre (1603)	Thomas Petre, 6th Baron Petre	1684	1706	
Baron Arundell of Wardour (1605)	Henry Arundell, 3rd Baron Arundell of Wardour	1643	1694	Died
Baron Arundell of Wardour (1605)	Thomas Arundell, 4th Baron Arundell of Wardour	1694	1712	
Baron Clifton (1608)	Katherine O'Brien, 7th Baroness Clifton	1672	1702	
Baron Teynham (1616)	John Roper, 6th Baron Teynham	1689	1697	Died
Baron Teynham (1616)	Christopher Roper, 7th Baron Teynham	1697	1699	Died
Baron Teynham (1616)	Henry Roper, 8th Baron Teynham	1699	1723	
Baron Brooke (1621)	Fulke Greville, 5th Baron Brooke	1677	1710	
Baron Grey of Warke (1624)	Ford Grey, 3rd Baron Grey of Werke	1674	1701	Created Earl of Tankerville in 1695, see above
Baron Craven (1627)	William Craven, 2nd Baron Craven	1697	1711	Barony previously held by the Earl of Craven
Baron Lovelace (1627)	John Lovelace, 3rd Baron Lovelace	1670	1693	Died
Baron Lovelace (1627)	John Lovelace, 4th Baron Lovelace	1693	1709	
Baron Poulett (1627)	John Poulett, 4th Baron Poulett	1679	1743	
Baron Clifford (1628)	Elizabeth Boyle, Baroness Clifford	1643	1691	Died, Barony succeeded by the Viscount Dungarvan
Baron Maynard (1628)	William Maynard, 2nd Baron Maynard	1640	1688/9	Died
Baron Maynard (1628)	Banastre Maynard, 3rd Baron Maynard	1688/9	1718	
Baron Coventry (1628)	Thomas Coventry, 5th Baron Coventry	1687	1699	Created Earl of Coventry, see above
Baron Mohun of Okehampton (1628)	Charles Mohun, 4th Baron Mohun of Okehampton	1677	1712	
Baron Herbert of Chirbury (1629)	Henry Herbert, 4th Baron Herbert of Chirbury	1678	1691	Died, title extinct
Baron Herbert of Chirbury (1641)	Thomas Wentworth, 3rd Baron Raby	1695	1739	Title previously held by the Earls of Strafford
Baron Leigh (1643)	Thomas Leigh, 2nd Baron Leigh	1672	1710	
Baron Jermyn (1643)	Thomas Jermyn, 2nd Baron Jermyn	1684	1703	
Baron Byron (1643)	William Byron, 3rd Baron Byron	1679	1695	Died
Baron Byron (1643)	William Byron, 4th Baron Byron	1695	1736	
Baron Widdrington (1643)	William Widdrington, 3rd Baron Widdrington	1675	1695	Died
Baron Widdrington (1643)	William Widdrington, 4th Baron Widdrington	1695	1716	
Baron Ward (1644)	Edward Ward, 2nd Baron Ward	1670	1701	Succeeded to the more senior Barony of Dudley, see above
Baron Colepeper (1644)	John Colepeper, 3rd Baron of Colepeper	1689	1719	
Baron Lucas of Shenfield (1645)	Robert Lucas, 3rd Baron Lucas of Shenfield	1688	1705	
Baron Belasyse (1645)	Henry Belasyse, 2nd Baron Belasyse	1689	1691	Died, title extinct
Baron Rockingham (1645)	Lewis Watson, 3rd Baron Rockingham	1689	1724	
Baron Lexinton (1645)	Robert Sutton, 2nd Baron Lexinton	1668	1723	
Baron Langdale (1658)	Marmaduke Langdale, 2nd Baron Langdale	1661	1703	
Baron Berkeley of Stratton (1658)	John Berkeley, 3rd Baron Berkeley of Stratton	1681	1697	Died
Baron Berkeley of Stratton (1658)	William Berkeley, 4th Baron Berkeley of Stratton	1697	1741	
Baron Cornwallis (1661)	Charles Cornwallis, 3rd Baron Cornwallis	1673	1698	Died
Baron Cornwallis (1661)	Charles Cornwallis, 4th Baron Cornwallis	1698	1722	
Baron Crew (1661)	Thomas Crew, 2nd Baron Crew	1679	1697	Died
Baron Crew (1661)	Nathaniel Crew, 3rd Baron Crew	1697	1721	
Baron Delamer (1661)	Henry Booth, 2nd Baron Delamer	1684	1694	Created Earl of Warrington, see above
Baron Holles (1661)	Francis Holles, 2nd Baron Holles	1680	1690	Died
Baron Holles (1661)	Denzil Holles, 3rd Baron Holles	1690	1692	Died, title extinct
Baron (A)bergavenny (1662)	George Nevill, 12th Baron Bergavenny	1666	1695	Died, title extinct or fell into abeyance
Baron Lucas of Crudwell (1663)	Mary Grey, 1st Baroness Lucas	1663	1702	
Baron Arundell of Trerice (1664)	John Arundell, 2nd Baron Arundell of Trerice	1687	1698	Died
Baron Arundell of Trerice (1664)	John Arundell, 3rd Baron Arundell of Trerice	1698	1706	
Baron Clifford of Chudleigh (1672)	Hugh Clifford, 2nd Baron Clifford of Chudleigh	1673	1730	
Baron Belasyse of Osgodby (1674)	Susan Belasyse, Baroness Belasyse	1674	1713	
Baron Willoughby of Parham (1680)	Thomas Willoughby, 11th Baron Willoughby of Parham	1680	1692	Died
Baron Willoughby of Parham (1680)	Hugh Willoughby, 12th Baron Willoughby of Parham	1692	1712	
Baron Carteret (1681)	George Carteret, 1st Baron Carteret	1681	1695	Died
Baron Carteret (1681)	John Carteret, 2nd Baron Carteret	1695	1763	
Baron Ossulston (1682)	John Bennet, 1st Baron Ossulston	1682	1695	Died
Baron Ossulston (1682)	Charles Bennet, 2nd Baron Ossulston	1695	1722	
Baron Dartmouth (1682)	George Legge, 1st Baron Dartmouth	1682	1691	Died
Baron Dartmouth (1682)	William Legge, 2nd Baron Dartmouth	1691	1750	
Baron Stawell (1683)	John Stawell, 2nd Baron Stawell	1689	1692	Died
Baron Stawell (1683)	William Stawell, 3rd Baron Stawell	1692	1742	
Baron Guilford (1683)	Francis North, 2nd Baron Guilford	1685	1729	
Baron Godolphin (1684)	Sidney Godolphin, 1st Baron Godolphin	1684	1712	
Baron Jeffreys (1685)	John Jeffreys, 2nd Baron Jeffreys	1689	1702	
Baron Waldegrave (1686)	James Waldegrave, 2nd Baron Waldegrave	1689	1741	
Baron Griffin (1688)	Edward Griffin, 1st Baron Griffin	1688	1710	
Baron Ashburnham (1689)	John Ashburnham, 1st Baron Ashburnham	1689	1710	
Baron Cholmondeley (1689)	Hugh Cholmondeley, 1st Baron Cholmondeley	1689	1725	
Baron Capell of Tewkesbury (1692)	Henry Capell, 1st Baron Capell of Tewkesbury	1692	1696	New creation; died, title extinct
Baron Leominster (1692)	William Fermor, 1st Baron Leominster	1692	1711	New creation
Baron Herbert of Chirbury (1694)	Henry Herbert, 1st Baron Herbert of Chirbury	1694	1709	New creation
Baron Abergavenny (1695)	George Nevill, 13th Baron Bergavenny	1695	1721	New creation
Baron Haversham (1696)	John Thompson, 1st Baron Haversham	1696	1710	New creation
Baron Somers (1697)	John Somers, 1st Baron Somers	1697	1716	New creation
Baron Barnard (1698)	Christopher Vane, 1st Baron Barnard	1698	1723	New creation

== Peerage of Scotland ==
Title	Holder	Date gained	Date lost	Notes
Duke of Rothesay (1398)	James Stuart, Duke of Rothesay	1688	1702	
Duke of Hamilton (1643)	Anne Hamilton, 3rd Duchess of Hamilton	1651	1698	Died
Duke of Hamilton (1643)	James Hamilton, 4th Duke of Hamilton	1698	1712	
Duke of Buccleuch (1663)	Anne Scott, 1st Duchess of Buccleuch	1663	1732	
Duke of Lennox (1675)	Charles Lennox, 1st Duke of Lennox	1675	1723	
Duke of Queensberry (1684)	William Douglas, 1st Duke of Queensberry	1684	1695	Died
Duke of Queensberry (1684)	James Douglas, 2nd Duke of Queensberry	1695	1711	
Duke of Gordon (1684)	George Gordon, 1st Duke of Gordon	1684	1716	
Marquess of Douglas (1633)	James Douglas, 2nd Marquess of Douglas	1660	1700	
Marquess of Montrose (1644)	James Graham, 4th Marquess of Montrose	1684	1742	
Marquess of Atholl (1676)	John Murray, 1st Marquess of Atholl	1676	1703	
Marquess of Tweeddale (1694)	John Hay, 1st Marquess of Tweeddale	1694	1697	New creation, died
Marquess of Tweeddale (1694)	John Hay, 2nd Marquess of Tweeddale	1697	1713	
Earl of Argyll (1457)	Archibald Campbell, 10th Earl of Argyll	1685	1703	
Earl of Crawford (1398)	William Lindsay, 18th Earl of Crawford	1678	1698	Died
Earl of Crawford (1398)	John Lindsay, 19th Earl of Crawford	1698	1713	
Earl of Erroll (1452)	John Hay, 12th Earl of Erroll	1674	1704	
Earl Marischal (1458)	George Keith, 8th Earl Marischal	1671	1694	Died
Earl Marischal (1458)	William Keith, 9th Earl Marischal	1694	1712	
Earl of Sutherland (1235)	George Gordon, 15th Earl of Sutherland	1679	1703	
Earl of Mar (1114)	John Erskine, Earl of Mar	1689	1732	
Earl of Rothes (1458)	Margaret Leslie, 8th Countess of Rothes	1681	1700	
Earl of Morton (1458)	James Douglas, 11th Earl of Morton	1686	1715	
Earl of Menteith (1427)	William Graham, 8th Earl of Menteith	1661	1694	Died; peerage either extinct or dormant on his death
Earl of Glencairn (1488)	John Cunningham, 11th Earl of Glencairn	1670	1703	
Earl of Eglinton (1507)	Alexander Montgomerie, 8th Earl of Eglinton	1669	1701	
Earl of Cassilis (1509)	John Kennedy, 7th Earl of Cassilis	1668	1701	
Earl of Caithness (1455)	George Sinclair, 7th Earl of Caithness	1681	1698	Died
Earl of Caithness (1455)	John Sinclair, 8th Earl of Caithness	1698	1705	
Earl of Buchan (1469)	William Erskine, 8th Earl of Buchan	1664	1695	Died
Earl of Buchan (1469)	David Erskine, 9th Earl of Buchan	1695	1745	
Earl of Moray (1562)	Alexander Stuart, 5th Earl of Moray	1653	1701	
Earl of Linlithgow (1600)	George Livingston, 3rd Earl of Linlithgow	1650	1690	Died
Earl of Linlithgow (1600)	George Livingston, 4th Earl of Linlithgow	1690	1695	
Earl of Linlithgow (1600)	James Livingston, 5th Earl of Linlithgow	1695	1716	
Earl of Winton (1600)	George Seton, 4th Earl of Winton	1650	1704	
Earl of Home (1605)	Charles Home, 6th Earl of Home	1687	1706	
Earl of Perth (1605)	James Drummond, 4th Earl of Perth	1675	1716	
Earl of Dunfermline (1605)	James Seton, 4th Earl of Dunfermline	1677	1690	Title forfeited
Earl of Wigtown (1606)	John Fleming, 6th Earl of Wigtown	1681	1744	
Earl of Abercorn (1606)	Claud Hamilton, 4th Earl of Abercorn	1680	1691	
Earl of Abercorn (1606)	Charles Hamilton, 5th Earl of Abercorn	1691	1701	
Earl of Strathmore and Kinghorne (1606)	Patrick Lyon, 3rd Earl of Strathmore and Kinghorne	1646	1695	Died
Earl of Strathmore and Kinghorne (1606)	John Lyon, 4th Earl of Strathmore and Kinghorne	1695	1712	
Earl of Roxburghe (1616)	Robert Ker, 4th Earl of Roxburghe	1682	1696	Died
Earl of Roxburghe (1616)	John Ker, 5th Earl of Roxburghe	1696	1741	
Earl of Kellie (1619)	Alexander Erskine, 4th Earl of Kellie	1677	1710	
Earl of Haddington (1619)	Thomas Hamilton, 6th Earl of Haddington	1685	1735	
Earl of Nithsdale (1620)	Robert Maxwell, 4th Earl of Nithsdale	1677	1696	Died
Earl of Nithsdale (1620)	William Maxwell, 5th Earl of Nithsdale	1696	1716	
Earl of Galloway (1623)	Alexander Stewart, 3rd Earl of Galloway	1671	1690	Died
Earl of Galloway (1623)	Alexander Stewart, 4th Earl of Galloway	1690	1694	Died
Earl of Galloway (1623)	James Stewart, 5th Earl of Galloway	1694	1746	
Earl of Seaforth (1623)	Kenneth Mackenzie, 4th Earl of Seaforth	1678	1701	
Earl of Lauderdale (1624)	Charles Maitland, 3rd Earl of Lauderdale	1682	1691	Died
Earl of Lauderdale (1624)	Richard Maitland, 4th Earl of Lauderdale	1691	1695	Died
Earl of Lauderdale (1624)	John Maitland, 5th Earl of Lauderdale	1695	1710	
Earl of Lothian (1631)	Robert Kerr, 2nd Earl of Lothian	1675	1703	
Earl of Airth (1633)	William Graham, 2nd Earl of Airth	1661	1694	Died, title dormant
Earl of Loudoun (1633)	Hugh Campbell, 3rd Earl of Loudoun	1684	1731	
Earl of Kinnoull (1633)	William Hay, 6th Earl of Kinnoull	1687	1709	
Earl of Dumfries (1633)	William Crichton, 2nd Earl of Dumfries	1643	1691	Died
Earl of Dumfries (1633)	William Crichton, 3rd Earl of Dumfries	1691	1694	Died
Earl of Dumfries (1633)	Penelope Crichton, 4th Countess of Dumfries	1694	1742	
Earl of Stirling (1633)	Henry Alexander, 4th Earl of Stirling	1644	1691	Died
Earl of Stirling (1633)	Henry Alexander, 5th Earl of Stirling	1691	1739	
Earl of Elgin (1633)	Thomas Bruce, 3rd Earl of Elgin	1685	1741	
Earl of Southesk (1633)	Charles Carnegie, 4th Earl of Southesk	1688	1699	Died
Earl of Southesk (1633)	James Carnegie, 5th Earl of Southesk	1699	1716	
Earl of Traquair (1633)	Charles Stewart, 4th Earl of Traquair	1673	1741	
Earl of Ancram (1633)	Charles Kerr, 2nd Earl of Ancram	1654	1690	Died; Title succeeded by the Earl of Lothian, see above
Earl of Wemyss (1633)	Margaret Wemyss, 3rd Countess of Wemyss	1679	1705	
Earl of Dalhousie (1633)	George Ramsay, 4th Earl of Dalhousie	1682	1696	Died
Earl of Dalhousie (1633)	William Ramsay, 5th Earl of Dalhousie	1696	1710	
Earl of Findlater (1638)	James Ogilvy, 3rd Earl of Findlater	1658	1711	
Earl of Airlie (1639)	James Ogilvy, 2nd Earl of Airlie	1665	1703	
Earl of Carnwath (1639)	John Dalzell, 4th Earl of Carnwath	1683	1702	
Earl of Callendar (1641)	Alexander Livingston, 3rd Earl of Callendar	1685	1692	Died
Earl of Callendar (1641)	James Livingston, 4th Earl of Callendar	1692	1716	
Earl of Leven (1641)	David Leslie, 3rd Earl of Leven	1676	1728	
Earl of Dysart (1643)	Elizabeth Tollemache, 2nd Countess of Dysart	1654	1698	Died
Earl of Dysart (1643)	Lionel Tollemache, 3rd Earl of Dysart	1698	1727	
Earl of Panmure (1646)	James Maule, 4th Earl of Panmure	1686	1716	
Earl of Selkirk (1646)	William Hamilton, 1st Earl of Selkirk	1646	1694	Died
Earl of Selkirk (1646)	Charles Douglas, 2nd Earl of Selkirk	1694	1739	
Earl of Tweeddale (1646)	John Hay, 2nd Earl of Tweeddale	1653	1697	Created Marquess of Tweeddale, see above
Earl of Northesk (1647)	David Carnegie, 4th Earl of Northesk	1688	1729	
Earl of Kincardine (1647)	Alexander Bruce, 3rd Earl of Kincardine	1680	1705	
Earl of Balcarres (1651)	Colin Lindsay, 3rd Earl of Balcarres	1662	1722	
Earl of Tarras (1660)	Walter Scott, Earl of Tarras	1660	1693	Died; peerage was for life only
Earl of Aboyne (1660)	Charles Gordon, 2nd Earl of Aboyne	1681	1702	
Earl of Middleton (1660)	Charles Middleton, 2nd Earl of Middleton	1674	1695	Attainted
Earl of Newburgh (1660)	Charles Livingston, 2nd Earl of Newburgh	1670	1755	
Earl of Annandale and Hartfell (1661)	William Johnstone, 2nd Earl of Annandale and Hartfell	1672	1721	
Earl of Kilmarnock (1661)	William Boyd, 1st Earl of Kilmarnock	1661	1692	Died
Earl of Kilmarnock (1661)	William Boyd, 2nd Earl of Kilmarnock	1692	1692	Died
Earl of Kilmarnock (1661)	William Boyd, 3rd Earl of Kilmarnock	1692	1717	
Earl of Forfar (1661)	Archibald Douglas, 1st Earl of Forfar	1661	1712	
Earl of Dundonald (1669)	John Cochrane, 2nd Earl of Dundonald	1685	1690	Died
Earl of Dundonald (1669)	William Cochrane, 3rd Earl of Dundonald	1690	1705	
Earl of Dumbarton (1675)	George Douglas, 1st Earl of Dumbarton	1675	1692	Died
Earl of Dumbarton (1675)	George Douglas, 2nd Earl of Dumbarton	1692	1749	
Earl of Kintore (1677)	John Keith, 1st Earl of Kintore	1677	1714	
Earl of Breadalbane and Holland (1677)	John Campbell, 1st Earl of Breadalbane and Holland	1677	1717	
Earl of Aberdeen (1682)	George Gordon, 1st Earl of Aberdeen	1682	1720	
Earl of Melfort (1686)	John Drummond, 1st Earl of Melfort	1686	1695	Attainted; peerage remained under attainder until 1853
Earl of Dunmore (1686)	Charles Murray, 1st Earl of Dunmore	1686	1710	
Earl of Melville (1690)	George Melville, 1st Earl of Melville	1690	1707	New creation
Earl of Orkney (1696)	George Hamilton, 1st Earl of Orkney	1696	1737	New creation
Earl of Tullibardine (1696)	John Murray, 1st Earl of Tullibardine	1696	1724	New creation
Earl of Ruglen (1697)	John Hamilton, 1st Earl of Ruglen	1697	1744	New creation
Earl of March (1697)	William Douglas, 1st Earl of March	1697	1705	New creation
Earl of Marchmont (1697)	Patrick Hume, 1st Earl of Marchmont	1697	1724	New creation; cr. Lord Polwarth in 1690
Viscount of Falkland (1620)	Anthony Cary, 5th Viscount of Falkland	1663	1694	Died
Viscount of Falkland (1620)	Lucius Henry Cary, 6th Viscount of Falkland	1694	1730	
Viscount of Dunbar (1620)	Robert Constable, 3rd Viscount of Dunbar	1668	1714	
Viscount of Stormont (1621)	David Murray, 5th Viscount of Stormont	1668	1731	
Viscount of Kenmure (1633)	Alexander Gordon, 5th Viscount of Kenmure	1663	1698	Died
Viscount of Kenmure (1633)	William Gordon, 6th Viscount of Kenmure	1698	1715	
Viscount of Arbuthnott (1641)	Robert Arbuthnot, 3rd Viscount of Arbuthnott	1682	1694	Died
Viscount of Arbuthnott (1641)	Robert Arbuthnot, 4th Viscount of Arbuthnott	1694	1710	
Viscount of Frendraught (1642)	Lewis Crichton, 4th Viscount of Frendraught	1686	1690	Title forfeited
Viscount of Oxfuird (1651)	Robert Makgill, 2nd Viscount of Oxfuird	1663	1706	
Viscount of Kingston (1651)	Alexander Seton, 1st Viscount of Kingston	1651	1691	Died
Viscount of Kingston (1651)	Archibald Seton, 2nd Viscount of Kingston	1691	1713	
Viscount of Irvine (1661)	Arthur Ingram, 3rd Viscount of Irvine	1668	1702	
Viscount of Kilsyth (1661)	James Livingston, 2nd Viscount of Kilsyth	1661	1706	
Viscount Preston (1681)	Richard Graham, 1st Viscount Preston	1681	1695	Died
Viscount Preston (1681)	Edward Graham, 2nd Viscount Preston	1695	1710	
Viscount of Newhaven (1681)	Charles Cheyne, 1st Viscount Newhaven	1681	1698	Died
Viscount of Newhaven (1681)	William Cheyne, 2nd Viscount Newhaven	1698	1728	
Viscount of Teviot (1685)	Robert Spencer, 1st Viscount Teviot	1685	1694	Died, title extinct
Viscount of Tarbat (1685)	George Mackenzie, 1st Viscount of Tarbat	1685	1714	
Viscount of Strathallan (1686)	William Drummond, 2nd Viscount Strathallan	1688	1702	
Viscount of Dundee (1688)	David Graham, 3rd Viscount of Dundee	1689	1690	Title forfeited
Viscount of Stair (1690)	James Dalrymple, 1st Viscount of Stair	1690	1695	New creation; died
Viscount of Stair (1690)	John Dalrymple, 2nd Viscount of Stair	1697	1707	
Viscount of Teviot (1696)	Thomas Livingston, 1st Viscount Teviot	1696	1711	New creation
Viscount Seafield (1698)	James Ogilvy, 1st Viscount Seafield	1698	1730	New creation
Lord Somerville (1430)	James Somerville, 11th Lord Somerville	1677	1693	Died
Lord Somerville (1430)	James Somerville, 12th Lord Somerville	1693	1709	
Lord Forbes (1442)	William Forbes, 11th Lord Forbes	1672	1697	Died
Lord Forbes (1442)	William Forbes, 12th Lord Forbes	1697	1716	
Lord Saltoun (1445)	Alexander Fraser, 11th Lord Saltoun	1669	1693	Died
Lord Saltoun (1445)	William Fraser, 12th Lord Saltoun	1693	1715	
Lord Gray (1445)	Patrick Gray, 8th Lord Gray	1663	1711	
Lord Sinclair (1449)	Henry St Clair, 10th Lord Sinclair	1676	1723	
Lord Oliphant (1455)	Charles Oliphant, 7th Lord Oliphant	1680	1709	
Lord Cathcart (1460)	Alan Cathcart, 6th Lord Cathcart	1628	1709	
Lord Lovat (1464)	Hugh Fraser, 9th Lord Lovat	1672	1696	Died
Lord Lovat (1464)	Thomas Fraser, 10th Lord Lovat	1696	1699	Died
Lord Lovat (1464)	Simon Fraser, 11th Lord Lovat	1699	1746	
Lord Sempill (1489)	Anne Abercromby, 9th Lady Sempill	1684	1695	Died
Lord Sempill (1489)	Francis Sempill, 10th Lord Sempill	1695	1716	
Lord Ross (1499)	William Ross, 12th Lord Ross	1682	1738	
Lord Elphinstone (1509)	John Elphinstone, 8th Lord Elphinstone	1669	1718	
Lord Torphichen (1564)	Walter Sandilands, 6th Lord Torphichen	1649	1696	Died
Lord Torphichen (1564)	James Sandilands, 7th Lord Torphichen	1696	1753	
Lord Lindores (1600)	John Leslie, 4th Lord Lindores	1666	1706	
Lord Colville of Culross (1604)	Alexander Colville, 5th Lord Colville of Culross	1680	1717	
Lord Balmerinoch (1606)	John Elphinstone, 3rd Lord Balmerino	1649	1704	
Lord Blantyre (1606)	Alexander Stuart, 5th Lord Blantyre	1670	1704	
Lord Balfour of Burleigh (1607)	Robert Balfour, 4th Lord Balfour of Burleigh	1688	1713	
Lord Cranstoun (1609)	William Cranstoun, 5th Lord Cranstoun	1688	1727	
Lord Dingwall (1609)	James Butler, 3rd Lord Dingwall	1684	1715	
Lord Cardross (1610)	Henry Erskine, 3rd Lord Cardross	1671	1693	Died
Lord Cardross (1610)	David Erskine, 4th Lord Cardross	1693	1745	Succeeded to the Earldom of Buchan in 1695, see above
Lord Melville of Monymaill (1616)	George Melville, 4th Lord Melville	1643	1707	Created Earl of Melville, see above
Lord Jedburgh (1622)	Robert Ker, 4th Lord Jedburgh	1670	1692	Died
Lord Jedburgh (1622)	William Ker, 5th Lord Jedburgh	1692	1722	
Lord Aston of Forfar (1627)	Walter Aston, 3rd Lord Aston of Forfar	1678	1714	
Lord Fairfax of Cameron (1627)	Thomas Fairfax, 5th Lord Fairfax of Cameron	1688	1710	
Lord Napier (1627)	Margaret Brisbane, 5th Lady Napier	1683	1706	
Lord Reay (1628)	George Mackay, 3rd Lord Reay	1681	1748	
Lord Cramond (1628)	Henry Richardson, 3rd Lord Cramond	1674	1701	
Lord Forbes of Pitsligo (1633)	Alexander Forbes, 2nd Lord Forbes of Pitsligo	1636	1690	Died
Lord Forbes of Pitsligo (1633)	Alexander Forbes, 3rd Lord Forbes of Pitsligo	1690	1690	Died
Lord Forbes of Pitsligo (1633)	Alexander Forbes, 4th Lord Forbes of Pitsligo	1690	1746	
Lord Kirkcudbright (1633)	James Maclellan, 6th Lord Kirkcudbright	1678	1730	
Lord Fraser (1633)	Charles Fraser, 4th Lord Fraser	Abt 1680	1715	
Lord Forrester (1633)	William Forrester, 4th Lord Forrester	1681	1705	
Lord Bargany (1641)	John Hamilton, 2nd Lord Bargany	1658	1693	Died
Lord Bargany (1641)	William Hamilton, 3rd Lord Bargany	1693	1712	
Lord Banff (1642)	George Ogilvy, 3rd Lord Banff	1668	1713	
Lord Elibank (1643)	Alexander Murray, 4th Lord Elibank	1687	1736	
Lord Dunkeld (1645)	James Galloway, 3rd Lord Dunkeld	1684	1690	Title forfeited
Lord Falconer of Halkerton (1646)	David Falconer, 3rd Lord Falconer of Halkerton	1684	1724	
Lord Belhaven and Stenton (1647)	John Hamilton, 2nd Lord Belhaven and Stenton	1679	1708	
Lord Carmichael (1647)	John Carmichael, 2nd Lord Carmichael	1672	1710	
Lord Duffus (1650)	James Sutherland, 2nd Lord Duffus	1674	1705	
Lord Rollo (1651)	Andrew Rollo, 3rd Lord Rollo	1669	1700	
Lord Ruthven of Freeland (1650)	David Ruthven, 2nd Lord Ruthven of Freeland	1673	1701	
Lord Rutherfurd (1661)	Robert Rutherfurd, 4th Lord Rutherfurd	1685	1724	
Lord Bellenden (1661)	John Bellenden, 2nd Lord Bellenden	1671	1707	
Lord Newark (1661)	David Leslie, 2nd Lord Newark	1682	1694	Died, title extinct
Lord Nairne (1681)	William Murray, 2nd Lord Nairne	1683	1716	
Lord Kinnaird (1682)	Patrick Kinnaird, 2nd Lord Kinnaird	1689	1701	
Lord Glasford (1685)	Francis Abercromby, Lord Glasford	1685	1703	
Lord Boyle of Kelburn, Stewartoun, Cumbrae, Finnick, Largs and Dalry (1699)	David Boyle, 1st Lord Boyle of Kelburn, Stewartoun, Cumbrae, Finnick, Largs and Dalry	1699	1733	New creation
Lord Portmore and Blackness (1699)	David Colyear, 1st Lord Portmore and Blackness	1699	1730	New creation

== Peerage of Ireland ==
Title	Holder	Date gained	Date lost	Notes
Duke of Ormonde (1661)	James Butler, 2nd Duke of Ormonde	1688	1715	
Duke of Leinster (1691)	Meinhard Schomberg, 1st Duke of Leinster	1691	1719	New creation
Earl of Kildare (1316)	John FitzGerald, 18th Earl of Kildare	1664	1707	
Earl of Waterford (1446)	Charles Talbot, 12th Earl of Waterford	1667	1718	
Earl of Clanricarde (1543)	Richard Burke, 8th Earl of Clanricarde	1687	1708	
Earl of Thomond (1543)	Henry O'Brien, 7th Earl of Thomond	1657	1691	Died
Earl of Thomond (1543)	Henry O'Brien, 8th Earl of Thomond	1691	1741	
Earl of Castlehaven (1616)	James Tuchet, 5th Earl of Castlehaven	1686	1700	
Earl of Cork (1620)	Richard Boyle, 2nd Earl of Cork	1643	1698	Died
Earl of Cork (1620)	Charles Boyle, 3rd Earl of Cork	1698	1703	
Earl of Antrim (1620)	Alexander MacDonnell, 3rd Earl of Antrim	1682	1699	Died
Earl of Antrim (1620)	Randal MacDonnell, 4th Earl of Antrim	1699	1721	
Earl of Westmeath (1621)	Richard Nugent, 3rd Earl of Westmeath	1684	1714	
Earl of Roscommon (1622)	Robert Dillon, 6th Earl of Roscommon	1689	1715	
Earl of Londonderry (1622)	Robert Ridgeway, 4th Earl of Londonderry	1672	1714	
Earl of Meath (1627)	Edward Brabazon, 4th Earl of Meath	1685	1707	
Earl of Barrymore (1628)	Richard Barry, 2nd Earl of Barrymore	1642	1694	Died
Earl of Barrymore (1628)	Laurence Barry, 3rd Earl of Barrymore	1694	1699	Died
Earl of Barrymore (1628)	James Barry, 4th Earl of Barrymore	1699	1747	
Earl of Carbery (1628)	John Vaughan, 3rd Earl of Carbery	1687	1713	
Earl of Fingall (1628)	Peter Plunkett, 4th Earl of Fingall	1684	1718	
Earl of Desmond (1628)	Basil Feilding, 3rd Earl of Desmond	1685	1717	
Earl of Donegall (1647)	Arthur Chichester, 3rd Earl of Donegall	1678	1706	
Earl of Cavan (1647)	Richard Lambart, 2nd Earl of Cavan	1660	1690	Died
Earl of Cavan (1647)	Charles Lambart, 3rd Earl of Cavan	1690	1702	
Earl of Inchiquin (1654)	William O'Brien, 2nd Earl of Inchiquin	1674	1692	
Earl of Clancarty (1658)	Donough MacCarthy, 4th Earl of Clancarty	1676	1691	Peerage attainted
Earl of Orrery (1660)	Lionel Boyle, 3rd Earl of Orrery	1682	1703	
Earl of Mountrath (1660)	Charles Coote, 3rd Earl of Mountrath	1672	1709	
Earl of Drogheda (1661)	Henry Hamilton-Moore, 3rd Earl of Drogheda	1679	1714	
Earl of Carlingford (1661)	Nicholas Taaffe, 2nd Earl of Carlingford	1677	1690	Died
Earl of Carlingford (1661)	Francis Taaffe 3rd Earl of Carlingford	1690	1704	
Earl of Mount Alexander (1661)	Hugh Montgomery, 2nd Earl of Mount Alexander	1663	1717	
Earl of Castlemaine (1661)	Roger Palmer, 1st Earl of Castlemaine	1661	1705	
Earl of Tyrone (1673)	Richard Power, 1st Earl of Tyrone	1673	1690	Died
Earl of Tyrone (1673)	John Power, 2nd Earl of Tyrone	1690	1693	Died
Earl of Tyrone (1673)	James Power, 3rd Earl of Tyrone	1693	1704	
Earl of Longford (1677)	Francis Aungier, 1st Earl of Longford	1677	1700	
Earl of Ranelagh (1677)	Richard Jones, 1st Earl of Ranelagh	1677	1711	
Earl of Granard (1684)	Arthur Forbes, 1st Earl of Granard	1684	1695	Died
Earl of Granard (1684)	Arthur Forbes, 2nd Earl of Granard	1695	1734	
Earl of Tyrconnell (1685)	Richard Talbot, 1st Earl of Tyrconnell	1685	1691	Peerage forfeit
Earl of Limerick (1686)	William Dongan, 1st Earl of Limerick	1686	1698	Died
Earl of Limerick (1686)	Thomas Dongan, 2nd Earl of Limerick	1698	1715	
Earl of Bellomont (1689)	Richard Coote, 1st Earl of Bellomont	1683	1701	
Earl of Athlone (1692)	Godert de Ginkell, 1st Earl of Athlone	1692	1703	New creation
Earl of Arran (1693)	Charles Butler, 1st Earl of Arran	1693	1758	New creation
Earl of Galway (1697)	Henri de Massue, Earl of Galway	1697	1720	New creation; also created Viscount Galway in 1692
Viscount Gormanston (1478)	Jenico Preston, 7th Viscount Gormanston	1643	1691	Declared an outlaw
Viscount Mountgarret (1550)	Richard Butler, 5th Viscount Mountgarret	1679	1706	
Viscount Grandison (1621)	George Villiers, 4th Viscount Grandison	1661	1699	Died
Viscount Grandison (1621)	John Villiers, 5th Viscount Grandison	1699	1766	
Viscount Valentia (1622)	James Annesley, 3rd Viscount Valentia	1686	1690	Died
Viscount Valentia (1622)	James Annesley, 4th Viscount Valentia	1690	1702	
Viscount Dillon (1622)	Theobald Dillon, 7th Viscount Dillon	1682	1690	Died
Viscount Dillon (1622)	Henry Dillon, 8th Viscount Dillon	1690	1713	
Viscount Loftus (1622)	Arthur Loftus, 3rd Viscount Loftus	1680	1725	
Viscount Beaumont of Swords (1622)	Thomas Beaumont, 3rd Viscount Beaumont of Swords	1658	1702	
Viscount Netterville (1622)	John Netterville, 4th Viscount Netterville	1689	1727	
Viscount Magennis (1623)	Bryan Magennis, 5th Viscount Magennis	1684	1692	Died
Viscount Magennis (1623)	Phelim Magennis, 6th Viscount Magennis	1692	1693	Peerage attainted
Viscount Kilmorey (1625)	Robert Needham, 7th Viscount Kilmorey	1687	1710	
Viscount Castleton (1627)	George Saunderson, 5th Viscount Castleton	1650	1714	
Viscount Mayo (1627)	Theobald Bourke, 6th Viscount Mayo	1681	1741	
Viscount Sarsfield (1627)	Dominick Sarsfield, 4th Viscount Sarsfield	1687	1691	Peerage forfeit
Viscount Chaworth (1628)	Patrick Chaworth, 3rd Viscount Chaworth	1644	1693	Died, title extinct
Viscount Lumley (1628)	Richard Lumley, 2nd Viscount Lumley	1663	1721	
Viscount Molyneux (1628)	Caryll Molyneux, 3rd Viscount Molyneux	1654	1699	Died
Viscount Molyneux (1628)	William Molyneux, 4th Viscount Molyneux	1699	1717	
Viscount Strangford (1628)	Philip Smythe, 2nd Viscount Strangford	1635	1708	
Viscount Scudamore (1628)	John Scudamore, 2nd Viscount Scudamore	1671	1697	Died
Viscount Scudamore (1628)	James Scudamore, 3rd Viscount Scudamore	1697	1716	
Viscount Wenman (1628)	Richard Wenman, 4th Viscount Wenman	1686	1690	Died
Viscount Wenman (1628)	Richard Wenman, 5th Viscount Wenman	1690	1728	
Viscount FitzWilliam (1629)	Thomas FitzWilliam, 4th Viscount FitzWilliam	1670	1704	
Viscount Fairfax of Emley (1629)	Charles Fairfax, 5th Viscount Fairfax of Emley	1651	1711	
Viscount Ikerrin (1629)	Pierce Butler, 4th Viscount Ikerrin	1688	1711	
Viscount Clanmalier (1631)	Maximilian O'Dempsey, 3rd Viscount Clanmalier	1683	1691	Attainted, peerage forfeited
Viscount Cullen (1642)	Charles Cokayne, 4th Viscount Cullen	1687	1716	
Viscount Carrington (1643)	Francis Smith, 2nd Viscount Carrington	1665	1701	
Viscount Tracy (1643)	William Tracy, 4th Viscount Tracy	1687	1712	
Viscount Bulkeley (1644)	Richard Bulkeley, 3rd Viscount Bulkeley	1688	1704	
Viscount Barnewall (1646)	Nicholas Barnewall, 3rd Viscount Barnewall	1688	1725	
Viscount Galmoye (1646)	Piers Butler, 3rd Viscount of Galmoye	1667	1697	Attainted, peerage forfeited
Viscount Massereene (1660)	John Skeffington, 2nd Viscount Massereene	1665	1695	Died
Viscount Massereene (1660)	Clotworthy Skeffington, 3rd Viscount Massereene	1695	1714	
Viscount Shannon (1660)	Francis Boyle, 1st Viscount Shannon	1660	1699	Died
Viscount Shannon (1660)	Richard Boyle, 2nd Viscount Shannon	1699	1740	
Viscount Fanshawe (1661)	Charles Fanshawe, 4th Viscount Fanshawe	1687	1710	
Viscount Cholmondeley (1661)	Hugh Cholmondeley, 2nd Viscount Cholmondeley	1681	1725	
Viscount Dungannon (1662)	Lewis Trevor, 2nd Viscount Dungannon	1670	1693	Died
Viscount Dungannon (1662)	Marcus Trevor, 3rd Viscount Dungannon	1693	1706	
Viscount Clare (1662)	Daniel O'Brien, 3rd Viscount Clare	1670	1691	Attainted
Viscount Fitzhardinge (1663)	Maurice Berkeley, 3rd Viscount Fitzhardinge	1668	1690	Died
Viscount Fitzhardinge (1663)	John Berkeley, 4th Viscount Fitzhardinge	1690	1712	
Viscount Charlemont (1665)	William Caulfeild, 2nd Viscount Charlemont	1671	1726	
Viscount Powerscourt (1665)	Folliott Wingfield, 1st Viscount Powerscourt	1665	1717	
Viscount Blesington (1673)	Murrough Boyle, 1st Viscount Blesington	1673	1718	
Viscount Lanesborough (1676)	James Lane, 2nd Viscount Lanesborough	1683	1724	
Viscount Downe (1680)	John Dawnay, 1st Viscount Downe	1680	1695	Died
Viscount Downe (1680)	Henry Dawnay, 2nd Viscount Downe	1695	1741	
Viscount Rosse (1681)	Richard Parsons, 1st Viscount Rosse	1681	1703	
Viscount Mountjoy (1683)	William Stewart, 1st Viscount Mountjoy	1683	1692	Died
Viscount Mountjoy (1683)	William Stewart, 2nd Viscount Mountjoy	1692	1728	
Viscount Lisburne (1685)	Adam Loftus, 1st Viscount Lisburne	1685	1691	Died, title extinct
Viscount Galway (1687)	Ulick Bourke, 1st Viscount Galway	1687	1691	Died, title extinct
Viscount Lisburne (1695)	John Vaughan, 1st Viscount Lisburne	1695	1721	New creation
Viscount Windsor (1699)	Thomas Windsor, 1st Viscount Windsor	1699	1738	New creation
Baron Athenry (1172)	Edward Bermingham, 13th Baron Athenry	1677	1709	
Baron Kingsale (1223)	Almericus de Courcy, 23rd Baron Kingsale	1669	1720	
Baron Kerry (1223)	William Fitzmaurice, 20th Baron Kerry	1661	1697	Died
Baron Kerry (1223)	Thomas Fitzmaurice, 21st Baron Kerry	1697	1741	
Baron Slane (1370)	Christopher Fleming, 17th Baron Slane	1676	1691	Attainted, peerage forfeited
Baron Howth (1425)	Thomas St Lawrence, 13th Baron Howth	1671	1727	
Baron Trimlestown (1461)	Matthias Barnewall, 10th Baron Trimlestown	1689	1692	Died
Baron Trimlestown (1461)	John Barnewall, 11th Baron Trimlestown	1692	1746	
Baron Dunsany (1462)	Christopher Plunkett, 10th Baron of Dunsany	1668	1690	Died
Baron Dunsany (1462)	Randall Plunkett, 11th Baron of Dunsany	1690	1735	
Baron Dunboyne (1541)	Pierce Butler, 5th/15th Baron Dunboyne	1662	1690	Died
Baron Dunboyne (1541)	James Butler, 6th/16th Baron Dunboyne	1690	1701	
Baron Upper Ossory (1541)	Barnaby Fitzpatrick, 7th Baron Upper Ossory	1666	1691	Attainted, peerage forfeited
Baron Bourke of Castleconnell (1580)	William Bourke, 8th Baron Bourke of Connell	1680	1691	Attainted, peerage forfeited
Baron Cahir (1583)	Theobald Butler, 5th Baron Cahir	1676	1700	
Baron Hamilton (1617)	Claud Hamilton, 5th Baron Hamilton of Strabane	1668	1691	Attainted
Baron Hamilton (1617)	Charles Hamilton, 6th Baron Hamilton of Strabane	1691	1701	Restored
Baron Bourke of Brittas (1618)	Theobald Bourke, 3rd Baron Bourke of Brittas	1668	1691	Attainted, title forfeited
Baron Folliot (1620)	Thomas Folliott, 2nd Baron Folliott	1622	1697	Died
Baron Folliot (1620)	Henry Folliott, 3rd Baron Folliott	1697	1716	
Baron Maynard (1620)	William Maynard, 2nd Baron Maynard	1640	1699	Died
Baron Maynard (1620)	Banastre Maynard, 3rd Baron Maynard	1699	1718	
Baron Gorges of Dundalk (1620)	Richard Gorges, 2nd Baron Gorges of Dundalk	1650	1712	
Baron Digby (1620)	William Digby, 5th Baron Digby	1685	1752	
Baron Fitzwilliam (1620)	William Fitzwilliam, 3rd Baron Fitzwilliam	1658	1719	
Baron Blayney (1621)	William Blayney, 6th Baron Blayney	1689	1705	
Baron Brereton (1624)	John Brereton, 4th Baron Brereton	1680	1718	
Baron Herbert of Castle Island (1624)	Henry Herbert, 4th Baron Herbert of Castle Island	1678	1691	Died, title extinct
Baron Baltimore (1625)	Charles Calvert, 3rd Baron Baltimore	1675	1715	
Baron Coleraine (1625)	Henry Hare, 2nd Baron Coleraine	1667	1708	
Baron Sherard (1627)	Bennet Sherard, 2nd Baron Sherard	1640	1700	
Baron Alington (1642)	Giles Alington, 4th Baron Alington	1685	1691	Died
Baron Alington (1642)	Hildebrand Alington, 5th Baron Alington	1691	1723	
Baron Hawley (1646)	Francis Hawley, 2nd Baron Hawley	1684	1743	
Baron Kingston (1660)	Robert King, 2nd Baron Kingston	1676	1693	Died
Baron Kingston (1660)	John King, 3rd Baron Kingston	1693	1728	
Baron Barry of Santry (1661)	Richard Barry, 2nd Baron Barry of Santry	1673	1694	Died
Baron Barry of Santry (1661)	Henry Barry, 3rd Baron Barry of Santry	1694	1734	
Baron Altham (1681)	Altham Annesley, 1st Baron Altham	1681	1699	Died
Baron Altham (1681)	James George Annesley, 2nd Baron Altham	1699	1700	
Baron Bellew of Duleek (1686)	John Bellew, 1st Baron Bellew of Duleek	1686	1693	Died
Baron Bellew of Duleek (1686)	Walter Bellew, 2nd Baron Bellew of Duleek	1693	1694	Died
Baron Bellew of Duleek (1686)	Richard Bellew, 3rd Baron Bellew of Duleek	1694	1715	
Baron Shelburne (1688)	Elizabeth Petty, Baroness Shelburne	1688	1708	
Baron Shelburne (1688)	Charles Petty, 1st Baron Shelburne	1688	1696	Died, title extinct
Baron Cutts of Gowran (1690)	John Cutts, 1st Baron Cutts	1690	1707	New creation
Baron Coningsby (1692)	Thomas Coningsby, 1st Baron Coningsby	1692	1729	New creation
Baron Shelburne (1699)	Henry Petty, 1st Baron Shelburne	1699	1751	New creation

Preceded by List of peers 1680–1689	Lists of peers by decade 1690–1699	Succeeded by List of peers 1700–1707
