= List of peers 1700–1707 =

This page lists all peers who held extant titles between 1700 and 30 April 1707.

== Peerage of England ==
Title	Holder	Date gained	Date lost	Notes
Duke of Cornwall (1337)	Prince James Francis Edward	1688	1702	Attainted, whereby all his honours became forfeited
Duke of Cornwall (1337)	none	1702	1714	
Duke of Norfolk (1483)	Henry Howard, 7th Duke of Norfolk	1684	1701	Died
Duke of Norfolk (1483)	Thomas Howard, 8th Duke of Norfolk	1701	1732	
Duke of Somerset (1547)	Charles Seymour, 6th Duke of Somerset	1678	1748	
Duke of Cleveland (1670)	Barbara Palmer, 1st Duchess of Cleveland	1670	1709	
Duke of Portsmouth (1673)	Louise de Kérouaille, Duchess of Portsmouth	1673	1734	
Duke of Richmond (1675)	Charles Lennox, 1st Duke of Richmond	1675	1723	
Duke of Southampton (1675)	Charles Fitzroy, 1st Duke of Southampton	1675	1730	
Duke of Grafton (1675)	Charles FitzRoy, 2nd Duke of Grafton	1690	1757	
Duke of Ormonde (1682)	James Butler, 1st Duke of Ormonde	1682	1715	
Duke of Beaufort (1682)	Henry Somerset, 1st Duke of Beaufort	1682	1700	Died
Duke of Beaufort (1682)	Henry Somerset, 2nd Duke of Beaufort	1700	1714	
Duke of Northumberland (1683)	George FitzRoy, 1st Duke of Northumberland	1683	1716	
Duke of St Albans (1684)	Charles Beauclerk, 1st Duke of St Albans	1684	1726	
Duke of Cumberland (1689)	Prince George, Duke of Cumberland	1689	1708	
Duke of Bolton (1689)	Charles Paulet, 2nd Duke of Bolton	1699	1722	
Duke of Schomberg (1689)	Meinhardt Schomberg, 3rd Duke of Schomberg	1693	1719	
Duke of Shrewsbury (1694)	Charles Talbot, 1st Duke of Shrewsbury	1694	1718	
Duke of Leeds (1694)	Thomas Osborne, 1st Duke of Leeds	1694	1712	
Duke of Bedford (1694)	William Russell, 1st Duke of Bedford	1694	1700	Died
Duke of Bedford (1694)	Wriothesley Russell, 2nd Duke of Bedford	1700	1711	
Duke of Devonshire (1694)	William Cavendish, 1st Duke of Devonshire	1694	1707	
Duke of Newcastle upon Tyne (1694)	John Holles, 1st Duke of Newcastle-upon-Tyne	1694	1711	
Duke of Marlborough (1702)	John Churchill, 1st Duke of Marlborough	1702	1722	New creation
Duke of Buckingham and Normanby (1703)	John Sheffield, 1st Duke of Buckingham and Normanby	1703	1721	New creation for the 1st Marquess of Normanby
Duke of Rutland (1703)	John Manners, 1st Duke of Rutland	1703	1711	New creation
Duke of Montagu (1705)	Ralph Montagu, 1st Duke of Montagu	1705	1709	New creation
Duke of Cambridge (1706)	Prince George, Duke of Cambridge	1706	1727	New creation
Marquess of Halifax (1682)	William Savile, 2nd Marquess of Halifax	1695	1700	Died, title extinct
Marquess of Powis (1687)	William Herbert, 2nd Marquess of Powis	1696	1745	
Marquess of Kent (1706)	Henry Grey, 1st Marquess of Kent	1706	1740	New creation
Marquess of Lindsey (1706)	Robert Bertie, 1st Marquess of Lindsey	1706	1723	New creation
Marquess of Dorchester (1706)	Evelyn Pierrepont, 1st Marquess of Dorchester	1706	1726	New creation
Earl of Oxford (1142)	Aubrey de Vere, 20th Earl of Oxford	1632	1703	Died,
Earl of Kent (1465)	Anthony Grey, 11th Earl of Kent	1651	1702	Died
Earl of Kent (1465)	Henry Grey, 12th Earl of Kent	1702	1740	Created Marquess of Kent in 1706, see above
Earl of Derby (1485)	William Stanley, 9th Earl of Derby	1672	1702	Died
Earl of Derby (1485)	James Stanley, 10th Earl of Derby	1702	1736	
Earl of Rutland (1525)	John Manners, 9th Earl of Rutlan	1679	1711	Created Duke of Rutland, see above
Earl of Huntingdon (1529)	Theophilus Hastings, 7th Earl of Huntingdon	1656	1701	Died
Earl of Huntingdon (1529)	George Hastings, 8th Earl of Huntingdon	1701	1705	Died
Earl of Huntingdon (1529)	Theophilus Hastings, 9th Earl of Huntingdon	1705	1746	
Earl of Pembroke (1551)	Thomas Herbert, 8th Earl of Pembroke	1683	1733	
Earl of Devon (1553)	William Courtenay, de jure 5th Earl of Devon	1638	1702	Died
Earl of Devon (1553)	William Courtenay, de jure 6th Earl of Devon	1702	1735	
Earl of Lincoln (1572)	Henry Clinton, 7th Earl of Lincoln	1693	1728	
Earl of Suffolk (1603)	Henry Howard, 5th Earl of Suffolk	1691	1709	
Earl of Dorset (1604)	Charles Sackville, 6th Earl of Dorset	1677	1706	Died
Earl of Dorset (1604)	Lionel Sackville, 7th Earl of Dorset	1706	1765	
Earl of Exeter (1605)	John Cecil, 5th Earl of Exeter	1678	1700	Died
Earl of Exeter (1605)	John Cecil, 6th Earl of Exeter	1700	1721	
Earl of Salisbury (1605)	James Cecil, 5th Earl of Salisbury	1694	1728	
Earl of Bridgewater (1617)	John Egerton, 3rd Earl of Bridgewater	1686	1701	
Earl of Bridgewater (1617)	Scroop Egerton, 4th Earl of Bridgewater	1701	1744	
Earl of Northampton (1618)	George Compton, 4th Earl of Northampton	1681	1727	
Earl of Leicester (1618)	Robert Sidney, 4th Earl of Leicester	1698	1702	Died
Earl of Leicester (1618)	Philip Sidney, 5th Earl of Leicester	1702	1705	
Earl of Leicester (1618)	John Sidney, 6th Earl of Leicester	1705	1737	
Earl of Warwick (1618)	Edward Rich, 6th Earl of Warwick	1675	1701	Died
Earl of Warwick (1618)	Edward Rich, 7th Earl of Warwick	1702	1721	
Earl of Denbigh (1622)	Basil Feilding, 4th Earl of Denbigh	1685	1717	
Earl of Bolingbroke (1624)	Paulet St John, 3rd Earl of Bolingbroke	1688	1711	
Earl of Westmorland (1624)	Thomas Fane, 6th Earl of Westmorland	1699	1736	
Earl of Manchester (1626)	Charles Montagu, 4th Earl of Manchester	1683	1722	
Earl of Berkshire (1626)	Thomas Howard, 3rd Earl of Berkshire	1679	1706	Died
Earl of Berkshire (1626)	Henry Howard, 4th Earl of Berkshire	1706	1757	
Earl Rivers (1626)	Richard Savage, 4th Earl Rivers	1694	1712	
Earl of Lindsey (1626)	Robert Bertie, 3rd Earl of Lindsey	1666	1701	Died
Earl of Lindsey (1626)	Robert Bertie, 4th Earl of Lindsey	1701	1723	Created Marquess of Lindsey, see above
Earl of Peterborough (1628)	Charles Mordaunt, 3rd Earl of Peterborough	1697	1735	
Earl of Stamford (1628)	Thomas Grey, 2nd Earl of Stamford	1673	1720	
Earl of Winchilsea (1628)	Charles Finch, 4th Earl of Winchilsea	1689	1712	
Earl of Kingston-upon-Hull (1628)	Evelyn Pierrepont, 5th Earl of Kingston-upon-Hull	1690	1726	Created Marquess of Dorchester, see above
Earl of Carnarvon (1628)	Charles Dormer, 2nd Earl of Carnarvon	1643	1709	
Earl of Chesterfield (1628)	Philip Stanhope, 2nd Earl of Chesterfield	1656	1714	
Earl of Thanet (1628)	Thomas Tufton, 6th Earl of Thanet	1684	1729	
Earl of Sunderland (1643)	Robert Spencer, 2nd Earl of Sunderland	1643	1702	Died
Earl of Sunderland (1643)	Charles Spencer, 3rd Earl of Sunderland	1702	1722	
Earl of Scarsdale (1645)	Robert Leke, 3rd Earl of Scarsdale	1681	1707	
Earl of Sandwich (1660)	Edward Montagu, 3rd Earl of Sandwich	1688	1729	
Earl of Anglesey (1661)	James Annesley, 3rd Earl of Anglesey	1690	1702	Died
Earl of Anglesey (1661)	John Annesley, 4th Earl of Anglesey	1702	1710	
Earl of Bath (1661)	John Granville, 1st Earl of Bath	1661	1701	Died
Earl of Bath (1661)	Charles Granville, 2nd Earl of Bath	1701	1701	Died
Earl of Bath (1661)	William Granville, 3rd Earl of Bath	1701	1711	
Earl of Cardigan (1661)	Robert Brudenell, 2nd Earl of Cardigan	1663	1703	Died
Earl of Cardigan (1661)	George Brudenell, 3rd Earl of Cardigan	1703	1732	
Earl of Clarendon (1661)	Henry Hyde, 2nd Earl of Clarendon	1674	1709	
Earl of Essex (1661)	Algernon Capell, 2nd Earl of Essex	1683	1710	
Earl of Carlisle (1661)	Charles Howard, 3rd Earl of Carlisle	1692	1738	
Earl of Ailesbury (1664)	Thomas Bruce, 2nd Earl of Ailesbury	1685	1741	Earl of Elgin in the Peerage of Scotland
Earl of Burlington (1664)	Charles Boyle, 2nd Earl of Burlington	1698	1704	Earl of Cork in the Peerage of Ireland; died
Earl of Burlington (1664)	Richard Boyle, 3rd Earl of Burlington	1704	1753	Earl of Cork in the Peerage of Ireland
Earl of Arlington (1672)	Isabella Fitzroy, 2nd Countess of Arlington	1685	1723	
Earl of Shaftesbury (1672)	Anthony Ashley-Cooper, 3rd Earl of Shaftesbury	1699	1713	
Earl of Lichfield (1674)	Edward Lee, 1st Earl of Lichfield	1674	1716	
Earl of Sussex (1674)	Thomas Lennard, 1st Earl of Sussex	1674	1715	
Earl of Feversham (1676)	Louis de Duras, 2nd Earl of Feversham	1677	1709	
Earl of Radnor (1679)	Charles Robartes, 2nd Earl of Radnor	1685	1723	
Earl of Macclesfield (1679)	Charles Gerard, 2nd Earl of Macclesfield	1695	1701	Died
Earl of Macclesfield (1679)	Fitton Gerard, 3rd Earl of Macclesfield	1701	1702	Died, title extinct
Earl of Yarmouth (1679)	William Paston, 2nd Earl of Yarmouth	1683	1732	
Earl of Berkeley (1679)	Charles Berkeley, 2nd Earl of Berkeley	1698	1710	
Earl of Nottingham (1681)	Daniel Finch, 2nd Earl of Nottingham	1682	1730	
Earl of Rochester (1682)	Laurence Hyde, 1st Earl of Rochester	1682	1711	
Earl of Abingdon (1682)	Montagu Venables-Bertie, 2nd Earl of Abingdon	1699	1743	
Earl of Gainsborough (1682)	Baptist Noel, 3rd Earl of Gainsborough	1690	1714	
Earl of Plymouth (1682)	Other Windsor, 2nd Earl of Plymouth	1687	1727	
Earl of Holderness (1682)	Robert Darcy, 3rd Earl of Holderness	1692	1721	
Earl of Dorchester (1686)	Catherine Sedley, Countess of Dorchester	1686	1717	
Earl of Derwentwater (1688)	Edward Radclyffe, 2nd Earl of Derwentwater	1697	1705	
Earl of Derwentwater (1688)	James Radclyffe, 3rd Earl of Derwentwater	1705	1716	
Earl of Stafford (1688)	Henry Stafford Howard, 1st Earl of Stafford	1688	1719	
Earl of Fauconberg (1689)	Thomas Belasyse, 1st Earl Fauconberg	1689	1700	Died, title extinct; Viscountcy Fauconberg succeeded by nephew, see below
Earl of Marlborough (1689)	John Churchill, 1st Earl of Marlborough	1689	1722	Created Duke of Marlborough, see above
Earl of Montagu (1689)	Ralph Montagu, 1st Earl of Montagu	1689	1709	Created Duke of Montagu, see above
Earl of Portland (1689)	William Bentinck, 1st Earl of Portland	1689	1709	
Earl of Torrington (1689)	Arthur Herbert, 1st Earl of Torrington	1689	1716	
Earl of Warrington (1690)	George Booth, 2nd Earl of Warrington	1694	1758	
Earl of Scarbrough (1690)	Richard Lumley, 1st Earl of Scarbrough	1721	1694	
Earl of Bradford (1694)	Francis Newport, 1st Earl of Bradford	1694	1708	
Earl of Romney (1694)	Henry Sydney, 1st Earl of Romney	1694	1704	Died, title extinct
Earl of Rochford (1695)	William Nassau de Zuylestein, 1st Earl of Rochford	1695	1708	
Earl of Tankerville (1695)	Ford Grey, 1st Earl of Tankerville	1695	1701	Died, title extinct
Earl of Albemarle (1697)	Arnold van Keppel, 1st Earl of Albemarle	1697	1718	
Earl of Coventry (1697)	Thomas Coventry, 2nd Earl of Coventry	1699	1710	
Earl of Orford (1697)	Edward Russell, 1st Earl of Orford	1697	1727	
Earl of Jersey (1697)	Edward Villiers, 1st Earl of Jersey	1697	1711	
Earl of Grantham (1698)	Henry de Nassau d'Auverquerque, 1st Earl of Grantham	1698	1754	
Earl of Wharton (1706)	Thomas Wharton, 1st Earl of Wharton	1706	1715	New creation
Earl Poulett (1706)	John Poulett, 1st Earl Poulett	1706	1743	New creation
Earl of Godolphin (1706)	Sidney Godolphin, 1st Earl of Godolphin	1706	1712	New creation
Earl of Cholmondeley (1706)	Hugh Cholmondeley, 1st Earl of Cholmondeley	1706	1725	New creation
Earl of Bindon (1706)	Henry Howard, 1st Earl of Bindon	1706	1718	New creation
Viscount Hereford (1550)	Edward Devereux, 8th Viscount Hereford	1683	1700	Died
Viscount Hereford (1550)	Price Devereux, 9th Viscount Hereford	1700	1740	
Viscount Montagu (1554)	Francis Browne, 4th Viscount Montagu	1682	1708	
Viscount Saye and Sele (1624)	Nathaniel Fiennes, 4th Viscount Saye and Sele	1698	1710	
Viscount Fauconberg (1643)	Thomas Belasyse, 3rd Viscount Fauconberg	1700	1718	
Viscount Hatton (1682)	Christopher Hatton, 1st Viscount Hatton	1682	1706	Died
Viscount Hatton (1682)	William Seton Hatton, 2nd Viscount Hatton	1706	1760	
Viscount Townshend (1682)	Charles Townshend, 2nd Viscount Townshend	1687	1738	
Viscount Weymouth (1682)	Thomas Thynne, 1st Viscount Weymouth	1682	1714	
Viscount de Longueville (1690)	Henry Yelverton, 1st Viscount Longueville	1690	1704	Died
Viscount de Longueville (1690)	Talbot Yelverton, 2nd Viscount de Longueville	1704	1731	
Viscount Lonsdale (1690)	John Lowther, 1st Viscount Lonsdale	1699	1700	Died
Viscount Lonsdale (1690)	Richard Lowther, 2nd Viscount Lonsdale	1700	1713	
Baron FitzWalter (1295)	Charles Mildmay, 18th Baron FitzWalter	1679	1728	
Baron Ferrers of Chartley (1299)	Robert Shirley, 14th Baron Ferrers of Chartley	1677	1717	
Baron Dudley (1440)	Edward Ward, 7th Baron Dudley	1697	1701	Died
Baron Dudley (1440)	Edward Ward, 8th Baron Dudley	1701	1704	Died
Baron Dudley (1440)	Edward Ward, 9th Baron Dudley	1704	1731	
Baron Stourton (1448)	Edward Stourton, 13th Baron Stourton	1685	1720	
Baron Willoughby de Broke (1491)	Richard Verney, 11th Baron Willoughby de Broke	1683	1711	
Baron Wentworth (1529)	Martha Johnson, 8th Baroness Wentworth	1697	1745	
Baron Mordaunt (1532)	Mary Howard, 7th Baroness Mordaunt	1697	1705	Died, Barony succeeded by the Earl of Peterborough, see above
Baron Eure (1544)	Ralph Eure, 7th Baron Eure	1672	1707	Died, title extinct
Baron Wharton (1545)	Thomas Wharton, 5th Baron Wharton	1695	1715	Created Earl of Wharton in 1706, see above
Baron Willoughby of Parham (1547)	Henry Willoughby, de jure 12th Baron Willoughby of Parham	1685	1722	
Baron Paget (1552)	William Paget, 6th Baron Paget	1678	1713	
Baron North (1554)	William North, 6th Baron North	1691	1734	
Baron Howard of Effingham (1554)	Thomas Howard, 6th Baron Howard of Effingham	1695	1725	
Baron Chandos (1554)	James Brydges, 8th Baron Chandos	1676	1714	
Baron Hunsdon (1559)	Robert Carey, 7th Baron Hunsdon	1692	1702	Died
Baron Hunsdon (1559)	William Ferdinand Carey, 8th Baron Hunsdon	1702	1765	
Baron De La Warr (1570)	John West, 6th Baron De La Warr	1687	1723	
Baron Gerard (1603)	Charles Gerard, 6th Baron Gerard	1684	1707	Died
Baron Gerard (1603)	Philip Gerard, 7th Baron Gerard	1707	1733	
Baron Petre (1603)	Thomas Petre, 6th Baron Petre	1684	1706	Died
Baron Petre (1603)	Robert Petre, 7th Baron Petre	1706	1713	
Baron Arundell of Wardour (1605)	Thomas Arundell, 4th Baron Arundell of Wardour	1694	1712	
Baron Clifton (1608)	Katherine O'Brien, 7th Baroness Clifton	1672	1702	Died
Baron Clifton (1608)	Katherine Hyde, 8th Baroness Clifton	1702	1706	Died
Baron Clifton (1608)	Edward Hyde, 9th Baron Clifton	1706	1713	
Baron Teynham (1616)	Henry Roper, 8th Baron Teynham	1699	1723	
Baron Brooke (1621)	Fulke Greville, 5th Baron Brooke	1677	1710	
Baron Grey of Warke (1624)	Ralph Grey, 4th Baron Grey of Werke	1701	1706	Title previously held by the Earl of Tankerville; died, title extinct
Baron Craven (1627)	William Craven, 2nd Baron Craven	1697	1711	
Baron Lovelace (1627)	John Lovelace, 4th Baron Lovelace	1693	1709	
Baron Poulett (1627)	John Poulett, 4th Baron Poulett	1679	1743	Created Earl Poulett, see above
Baron Maynard (1628)	Banastre Maynard, 3rd Baron Maynard	1699	1718	
Baron Mohun of Okehampton (1628)	Charles Mohun, 4th Baron Mohun of Okehampton	1677	1712	
Baron Herbert of Chirbury (1641)	Thomas Wentworth, 3rd Baron Raby	1695	1739	
Baron Leigh (1643)	Thomas Leigh, 2nd Baron Leigh	1672	1710	
Baron Jermyn (1643)	Thomas Jermyn, 2nd Baron Jermyn	1684	1703	Died
Baron Jermyn (1643)	Henry Jermyn, 3rd Baron Jermyn	1703	1708	
Baron Byron (1643)	William Byron, 4th Baron Byron	1695	1736	
Baron Widdrington (1643)	William Widdrington, 4th Baron Widdrington	1695	1716	
Baron Colepeper (1644)	John Colepeper, 3rd Baron of Colepeper	1689	1719	
Baron Lucas of Shenfield (1645)	Robert Lucas, 3rd Baron Lucas of Shenfield	1688	1705	Died, title extinct
Baron Rockingham (1645)	Lewis Watson, 3rd Baron Rockingham	1689	1724	
Baron Lexinton (1645)	Robert Sutton, 2nd Baron Lexinton	1668	1723	
Baron Langdale (1658)	Marmaduke Langdale, 2nd Baron Langdale	1661	1703	Died
Baron Langdale (1658)	Marmaduke Langdale, 3rd Baron Langdale	1703	1718	
Baron Berkeley of Stratton (1658)	William Berkeley, 4th Baron Berkeley of Stratton	1697	1741	
Baron Cornwallis (1661)	Charles Cornwallis, 4th Baron Cornwallis	1698	1722	
Baron Crew (1661)	Nathaniel Crew, 3rd Baron Crew	1697	1721	
Baron Lucas of Crudwell (1663)	Mary Grey, 1st Baroness Lucas	1663	1702	Died; Title succeeded by the Earl of Kent, see above
Baron Arundell of Trerice (1664)	John Arundell, 3rd Baron Arundell of Trerice	1698	1706	Died
Baron Arundell of Trerice (1664)	John Arundell, 4th Baron Arundell of Trerice	1706	1768	
Baron Clifford of Chudleigh (1672)	Hugh Clifford, 2nd Baron Clifford of Chudleigh	1673	1730	
Baron Belasyse of Osgodby (1674)	Susan Belasyse, Baroness Belasyse	1674	1713	
Baron Willoughby of Parham (1680)	Hugh Willoughby, 12th Baron Willoughby of Parham	1692	1712	
Baron Carteret (1681)	John Carteret, 2nd Baron Carteret	1695	1763	
Baron Ossulston (1682)	Charles Bennet, 2nd Baron Ossulston	1695	1722	
Baron Dartmouth (1682)	William Legge, 2nd Baron Dartmouth	1691	1750	
Baron Stawell (1683)	William Stawell, 3rd Baron Stawell	1692	1742	
Baron Guilford (1683)	Francis North, 2nd Baron Guilford	1685	1729	
Baron Godolphin (1684)	Sidney Godolphin, 1st Baron Godolphin	1684	1712	Created Earl of Godolphin, see above
Baron Jeffreys (1685)	John Jeffreys, 2nd Baron Jeffreys	1689	1702	Died, title extinct
Baron Waldegrave (1686)	James Waldegrave, 2nd Baron Waldegrave	1689	1741	
Baron Griffin (1688)	Edward Griffin, 1st Baron Griffin	1688	1710	
Baron Ashburnham (1689)	John Ashburnham, 1st Baron Ashburnham	1689	1710	
Baron Cholmondeley (1689)	Hugh Cholmondeley, 1st Baron Cholmondeley	1689	1725	Created Earl of Cholmondeley, see above
Baron Leominster (1692)	William Fermor, 1st Baron Leominster	1692	1711	
Baron Herbert of Chirbury (1694)	Henry Herbert, 1st Baron Herbert of Chirbury	1694	1709	
Baron Abergavenny (1695)	George Nevill, 13th Baron Bergavenny	1695	1721	
Baron Haversham (1696)	John Thompson, 1st Baron Haversham	1696	1710	
Baron Somers (1697)	John Somers, 1st Baron Somers	1697	1716	
Baron Barnard (1698)	Christopher Vane, 1st Baron Barnard	1698	1723	
Baron Halifax (1700)	Charles Montagu, 1st Baron Halifax	1700	1715	New creation
Baron Granville of Potheridge (1703)	John Granville, 1st Baron Granville of Potheridge	1703	1707	New creation
Baron Guernsey (1703)	Heneage Finch, 1st Baron Guernsey	1703	1719	New creation
Baron Gower (1703)	John Leveson-Gower, 1st Baron Gower	1703	1709	New creation
Baron Conway (1703)	Francis Seymour-Conway, 1st Baron Conway	1703	1732	New creation
Baron Hervey (1703)	John Hervey, 1st Baron Hervey	1703	1751	New creation
Baron Cowper (1706)	William Cowper, 1st Baron Cowper	1706	1723	New creation
Baron Pelham of Stanmer (1706)	Thomas Pelham, 1st Baron Pelham	1706	1712	New creation

== Peerage of Scotland ==
Title	Holder	Date gained	Date lost	Notes
Duke of Rothesay (1398)	James Stuart, Duke of Rothesay	1688	1702	Attainted
Duke of Hamilton (1643)	James Hamilton, 4th Duke of Hamilton	1698	1712	
Duke of Buccleuch (1663)	Anne Scott, 1st Duchess of Buccleuch	1663	1732	
Duke of Lennox (1675)	Charles Lennox, 1st Duke of Lennox	1675	1723	
Duke of Queensberry (1684)	James Douglas, 2nd Duke of Queensberry	1695	1711	
Duke of Gordon (1684)	George Gordon, 1st Duke of Gordon	1684	1716	
Duke of Argyll (1701)	Archibald Campbell, 1st Duke of Argyll	1701	1703	New creation; died
Duke of Argyll (1701)	John Campbell, 2nd Duke of Argyll	1703	1743	
Duke of Atholl (1703)	John Murray, 1st Duke of Atholl	1703	1724	New creation
Duke of Douglas (1703)	Archibald Douglas, 1st Duke of Douglas	1703	1761	New creation
Duke of Montrose (1707)	James Graham, 1st Duke of Montrose	1707	1742	New creation
Duke of Roxburghe (1707)	John Ker, 1st Duke of Roxburghe	1707	1741	New creation
Marquess of Douglas (1633)	James Douglas, 2nd Marquess of Douglas	1660	1700	Died
Marquess of Douglas (1633)	Archibald Douglas, 3rd Marquess of Douglas	1660	1700	Created Duke of Douglas, see above
Marquess of Montrose (1644)	James Graham, 4th Marquess of Montrose	1684	1742	Created Duke of Montrose, see above
Marquess of Atholl (1676)	John Murray, 1st Marquess of Atholl	1676	1703	Died
Marquess of Atholl (1676)	John Murray, 2nd Marquess of Atholl	1676	1703	Created Duke of Atholl, see above
Marquess of Tweeddale (1694)	John Hay, 2nd Marquess of Tweeddale	1697	1713	
Marquess of Lothian (1701)	Robert Kerr, 1st Marquess of Lothian	1701	1703	New creation; died
Marquess of Lothian (1701)	William Kerr, 2nd Marquess of Lothian	1703	1722	
Marquess of Annandale (1701)	William Johnstone, 1st Marquess of Annandale	1701	1721	New creation
Earl of Argyll (1457)	Archibald Campbell, 10th Earl of Argyll	1685	1703	Created Duke of Argyll, see above
Earl of Crawford (1398)	John Lindsay, 19th Earl of Crawford	1698	1713	
Earl of Erroll (1452)	John Hay, 12th Earl of Erroll	1674	1704	Died
Earl of Erroll (1452)	Charles Hay, 13th Earl of Erroll	1704	1717	
Earl Marischal (1458)	William Keith, 9th Earl Marischal	1694	1712	
Earl of Sutherland (1235)	George Gordon, 15th Earl of Sutherland	1679	1703	Died
Earl of Sutherland (1235)	John Gordon, 16th Earl of Sutherland	1703	1733	
Earl of Mar (1114)	John Erskine, Earl of Mar	1689	1732	
Earl of Rothes (1458)	Margaret Leslie, 8th Countess of Rothes	1681	1700	Died
Earl of Rothes (1458)	John Hamilton-Leslie, 9th Earl of Rothes	1700	1722	
Earl of Morton (1458)	James Douglas, 11th Earl of Morton	1686	1715	
Earl of Glencairn (1488)	John Cunningham, 11th Earl of Glencairn	1670	1703	Died
Earl of Glencairn (1488)	William Cunningham, 12th Earl of Glencairn	1703	1734	
Earl of Eglinton (1507)	Alexander Montgomerie, 8th Earl of Eglinton	1669	1701	Died
Earl of Eglinton (1507)	Alexander Montgomerie, 9th Earl of Eglinton	1701	1729	
Earl of Cassilis (1509)	John Kennedy, 7th Earl of Cassilis	1668	1701	Died
Earl of Cassilis (1509)	John Kennedy, 8th Earl of Cassilis	1701	1759	
Earl of Caithness (1455)	John Sinclair, 8th Earl of Caithness	1698	1705	
Earl of Caithness (1455)	Alexander Sinclair, 9th Earl of Caithness	1705	1765	
Earl of Buchan (1469)	David Erskine, 9th Earl of Buchan	1695	1745	
Earl of Moray (1562)	Alexander Stuart, 5th Earl of Moray	1653	1701	Died
Earl of Moray (1562)	Charles Stuart, 6th Earl of Moray	1701	1735	
Earl of Linlithgow (1600)	James Livingston, 5th Earl of Linlithgow	1695	1716	
Earl of Winton (1600)	George Seton, 4th Earl of Winton	1650	1704	Died
Earl of Winton (1600)	George Seton, 5th Earl of Winton	1704	1716	
Earl of Home (1605)	Charles Home, 6th Earl of Home	1687	1706	Died
Earl of Home (1605)	Alexander Home, 7th Earl of Home	1706	1720	
Earl of Perth (1605)	James Drummond, 4th Earl of Perth	1675	1716	
Earl of Wigtown (1606)	John Fleming, 6th Earl of Wigtown	1681	1744	
Earl of Abercorn (1606)	Charles Hamilton, 5th Earl of Abercorn	1691	1701	Died
Earl of Abercorn (1606)	James Hamilton, 6th Earl of Abercorn	1701	1734	
Earl of Strathmore and Kinghorne (1606)	John Lyon, 4th Earl of Strathmore and Kinghorne	1695	1712	
Earl of Roxburghe (1616)	John Ker, 5th Earl of Roxburghe	1696	1741	Create Duke of Roxburghe, see above
Earl of Kellie (1619)	Alexander Erskine, 4th Earl of Kellie	1677	1710	
Earl of Haddington (1619)	Thomas Hamilton, 6th Earl of Haddington	1685	1735	
Earl of Nithsdale (1620)	William Maxwell, 5th Earl of Nithsdale	1696	1716	
Earl of Galloway (1623)	James Stewart, 5th Earl of Galloway	1694	1746	
Earl of Seaforth (1623)	Kenneth Mackenzie, 4th Earl of Seaforth	1678	1701	Died
Earl of Seaforth (1623)	William Mackenzie, 5th Earl of Seaforth	1701	1716	
Earl of Lauderdale (1624)	John Maitland, 5th Earl of Lauderdale	1695	1710	
Earl of Lauderdale (1624)	John Maitland, 5th Earl of Lauderdale	1695	1710	
Earl of Lothian (1631)	Robert Kerr, 2nd Earl of Lothian	1675	1703	Created Marquess of Lothian, see above
Earl of Loudoun (1633)	Hugh Campbell, 3rd Earl of Loudoun	1684	1731	
Earl of Kinnoull (1633)	William Hay, 6th Earl of Kinnoull	1687	1709	
Earl of Dumfries (1633)	Penelope Crichton, 4th Countess of Dumfries	1694	1742	
Earl of Stirling (1633)	Henry Alexander, 5th Earl of Stirling	1691	1739	
Earl of Elgin (1633)	Thomas Bruce, 3rd Earl of Elgin	1685	1741	
Earl of Southesk (1633)	James Carnegie, 5th Earl of Southesk	1699	1716	
Earl of Traquair (1633)	Charles Stewart, 4th Earl of Traquair	1673	1741	
Earl of Wemyss (1633)	Margaret Wemyss, 3rd Countess of Wemyss	1679	1705	Died
Earl of Wemyss (1633)	David Wemyss, 4th Earl of Wemyss	1705	1720	
Earl of Dalhousie (1633)	William Ramsay, 5th Earl of Dalhousie	1696	1710	
Earl of Findlater (1638)	James Ogilvy, 3rd Earl of Findlater	1658	1711	
Earl of Airlie (1639)	James Ogilvy, 2nd Earl of Airlie	1665	1703	Died
Earl of Airlie (1639)	David Ogilvy, 3rd Earl of Airlie	1703	1717	
Earl of Carnwath (1639)	John Dalzell, 4th Earl of Carnwath	1683	1702	Died
Earl of Carnwath (1639)	Robert Dalzell, 5th Earl of Carnwath	1683	1737	
Earl of Callendar (1641)	James Livingston, 4th Earl of Callendar	1692	1716	
Earl of Leven (1641)	David Leslie, 3rd Earl of Leven	1676	1728	
Earl of Dysart (1643)	Lionel Tollemache, 3rd Earl of Dysart	1698	1727	
Earl of Panmure (1646)	James Maule, 4th Earl of Panmure	1686	1716	
Earl of Selkirk (1646)	Charles Douglas, 2nd Earl of Selkirk	1694	1739	
Earl of Northesk (1647)	David Carnegie, 4th Earl of Northesk	1688	1729	
Earl of Kincardine (1647)	Alexander Bruce, 3rd Earl of Kincardine	1680	1705	Died
Earl of Kincardine (1647)	Alexander Bruce, 4th Earl of Kincardine	1705	1706	Died
Earl of Kincardine (1647)	Robert Bruce, 5th Earl of Kincardine	1706	1718	
Earl of Balcarres (1651)	Colin Lindsay, 3rd Earl of Balcarres	1662	1722	
Earl of Aboyne (1660)	Charles Gordon, 2nd Earl of Aboyne	1681	1702	Died
Earl of Aboyne (1660)	John Gordon, 3rd Earl of Aboyne	1702	1732	
Earl of Newburgh (1660)	Charles Livingston, 2nd Earl of Newburgh	1670	1755	
Earl of Annandale and Hartfell (1661)	William Johnstone, 2nd Earl of Annandale and Hartfell	1672	1721	Created Marquess of Annandale, see above
Earl of Kilmarnock (1661)	William Boyd, 3rd Earl of Kilmarnock	1692	1717	
Earl of Forfar (1661)	Archibald Douglas, 1st Earl of Forfar	1661	1712	
Earl of Dundonald (1669)	William Cochrane, 3rd Earl of Dundonald	1690	1705	Died
Earl of Dundonald (1669)	John Cochrane, 4th Earl of Dundonald	1705	1720	
Earl of Dumbarton (1675)	George Douglas, 2nd Earl of Dumbarton	1692	1749	
Earl of Kintore (1677)	John Keith, 1st Earl of Kintore	1677	1714	
Earl of Breadalbane and Holland (1677)	John Campbell, 1st Earl of Breadalbane and Holland	1677	1717	
Earl of Aberdeen (1682)	George Gordon, 1st Earl of Aberdeen	1682	1720	
Earl of Dunmore (1686)	Charles Murray, 1st Earl of Dunmore	1686	1710	
Earl of Melville (1690)	George Melville, 1st Earl of Melville	1690	1707	
Earl of Orkney (1696)	George Hamilton, 1st Earl of Orkney	1696	1737	
Earl of Tullibardine (1696)	John Murray, 1st Earl of Tullibardine	1696	1724	Created Duke of Atholl, see above
Earl of Ruglen (1697)	John Hamilton, 1st Earl of Ruglen	1697	1744	
Earl of March (1697)	William Douglas, 1st Earl of March	1697	1705	Died
Earl of March (1697)	William Douglas, 2nd Earl of March	1705	1731	
Earl of Marchmont (1697)	Patrick Hume, 1st Earl of Marchmont	1697	1724	
Earl of Seafield (1701)	James Ogilvy, 1st Earl of Seafield	1701	1730	New creation
Earl of Hyndford (1701)	John Carmichael, 1st Earl of Hyndford	1701	1710	New creation
Earl of Cromartie (1703)	George Mackenzie, 1st Earl of Cromartie	1703	1714	New creation
Earl of Stair (1703)	John Dalrymple, 1st Earl of Stair	1703	1707	New creation; died
Earl of Stair (1703)	John Dalrymple, 2nd Earl of Stair	1707	1747	
Earl of Rosebery (1703)	Archibald Primrose, 1st Earl of Rosebery	1703	1723	New creation, also created Viscount of Rosebery in 1700
Earl of Glasgow (1703)	David Boyle, 1st Earl of Glasgow	1703	1733	New creation
Earl of Portmore (1703)	David Colyear, 1st Earl of Portmore	1703	1730	New creation
Earl of Bute (1703)	James Stuart, 1st Earl of Bute	1703	1710	New creation
Earl of Hopetoun (1703)	Charles Hope, 1st Earl of Hopetoun	1703	1742	New creation
Earl of Deloraine (1706)	Henry Scott, 1st Earl of Deloraine	1706	1730	New creation
Earl of Solway (1706)	Charles Douglas, 1st Earl of Solway	1706	1778	New creation
Earl of Ilay (1706)	Archibald Campbell, 1st Earl of Ilay	1706	1761	New creation
Viscount of Falkland (1620)	Lucius Henry Cary, 6th Viscount of Falkland	1694	1730	
Viscount of Dunbar (1620)	Robert Constable, 3rd Viscount of Dunbar	1668	1714	
Viscount of Stormont (1621)	David Murray, 5th Viscount of Stormont	1668	1731	
Viscount of Kenmure (1633)	William Gordon, 6th Viscount of Kenmure	1698	1715	
Viscount of Arbuthnott (1641)	Robert Arbuthnot, 4th Viscount of Arbuthnott	1694	1710	
Viscount of Oxfuird (1651)	Robert Makgill, 2nd Viscount of Oxfuird	1663	1706	Died, title dormant until 1977
Viscount of Kingston (1651)	Archibald Seton, 2nd Viscount of Kingston	1691	1713	
Viscount of Irvine (1661)	Arthur Ingram, 3rd Viscount of Irvine	1668	1702	Died
Viscount of Irvine (1661)	Edward Machel Ingram, 4th Viscount of Irvine	1702	1714	
Viscount of Kilsyth (1661)	James Livingston, 2nd Viscount of Kilsyth	1661	1706	Died
Viscount of Kilsyth (1661)	William Livingston, 3rd Viscount of Kilsyth	1706	1716	
Viscount Preston (1681)	Edward Graham, 2nd Viscount Preston	1695	1710	
Viscount of Newhaven (1681)	William Cheyne, 2nd Viscount Newhaven	1698	1728	
Viscount of Tarbat (1685)	George Mackenzie, 1st Viscount of Tarbat	1685	1714	Created Earl of Cromartie, see above
Viscount of Strathallan (1686)	William Drummond, 2nd Viscount Strathallan	1688	1702	Died
Viscount of Strathallan (1686)	William Drummond, 3rd Viscount Strathallan	1702	1711	
Viscount of Stair (1690)	John Dalrymple, 2nd Viscount of Stair	1695	1707	Created Earl of Stair, see above
Viscount of Teviot (1696)	Thomas Livingston, 1st Viscount Teviot	1696	1711	
Viscount Seafield (1698)	James Ogilvy, 1st Viscount Seafield	1698	1730	Created Earl of Seafield, see above
Viscount of Garnock (1703)	John Lindsay-Crawford, 1st Viscount of Garnock	1703	1708	New creation
Viscount of Primrose (1703)	James Primrose, 1st Viscount of Primrose	1703	1706	New creation; died
Viscount of Primrose (1703)	Archibald Primrose, 2nd Viscount of Primrose	1706	1716	
Lord Somerville (1430)	James Somerville, 12th Lord Somerville	1693	1709	
Lord Forbes (1442)	William Forbes, 12th Lord Forbes	1697	1716	
Lord Saltoun (1445)	William Fraser, 12th Lord Saltoun	1693	1715	
Lord Gray (1445)	Patrick Gray, 8th Lord Gray	1663	1711	
Lord Sinclair (1449)	Henry St Clair, 10th Lord Sinclair	1676	1723	
Lord Oliphant (1455)	Charles Oliphant, 7th Lord Oliphant	1680	1709	
Lord Cathcart (1460)	Alan Cathcart, 6th Lord Cathcart	1628	1709	
Lord Lovat (1464)	Simon Fraser, 11th Lord Lovat	1699	1746	
Lord Sempill (1489)	Francis Sempill, 10th Lord Sempill	1695	1716	
Lord Ross (1499)	William Ross, 12th Lord Ross	1682	1738	
Lord Elphinstone (1509)	John Elphinstone, 8th Lord Elphinstone	1669	1718	
Lord Torphichen (1564)	James Sandilands, 7th Lord Torphichen	1696	1753	
Lord Lindores (1600)	John Leslie, 4th Lord Lindores	1666	1706	Died
Lord Lindores (1600)	David Leslie, 5th Lord Lindores	1706	1719	
Lord Colville of Culross (1604)	Alexander Colville, 5th Lord Colville of Culross	1680	1717	
Lord Balmerinoch (1606)	John Elphinstone, 3rd Lord Balmerino	1649	1704	Died
Lord Balmerinoch (1606)	John Elphinstone, 4th Lord Balmerino	1704	1736	
Lord Blantyre (1606)	Alexander Stuart, 5th Lord Blantyre	1670	1704	Died
Lord Blantyre (1606)	Walter Stuart, 6th Lord Blantyre	1704	1713	
Lord Balfour of Burleigh (1607)	Robert Balfour, 4th Lord Balfour of Burleigh	1688	1713	
Lord Cranstoun (1609)	William Cranstoun, 5th Lord Cranstoun	1688	1727	
Lord Dingwall (1609)	James Butler, 3rd Lord Dingwall	1684	1715	
Lord Jedburgh (1622)	William Ker, 5th Lord Jedburgh	1692	1722	Succeeded to the Marquessate of Lothian, see above
Lord Aston of Forfar (1627)	Walter Aston, 3rd Lord Aston of Forfar	1678	1714	
Lord Fairfax of Cameron (1627)	Thomas Fairfax, 5th Lord Fairfax of Cameron	1688	1710	
Lord Napier (1627)	Margaret Brisbane, 5th Lady Napier	1683	1706	Died
Lord Napier (1627)	Francis Napier, 6th Lord Napier	1706	1773	
Lord Reay (1628)	George Mackay, 3rd Lord Reay	1681	1748	
Lord Cramond (1628)	Henry Richardson, 3rd Lord Cramond	1674	1701	Died
Lord Cramond (1628)	William Richardson, 4th Lord Cramond	1701	1719	
Lord Forbes of Pitsligo (1633)	Alexander Forbes, 4th Lord Forbes of Pitsligo	1690	1746	
Lord Kirkcudbright (1633)	James Maclellan, 6th Lord Kirkcudbright	1678	1730	
Lord Fraser (1633)	Charles Fraser, 4th Lord Fraser	Abt 1680	1715	
Lord Forrester (1633)	William Forrester, 4th Lord Forrester	1681	1705	Died
Lord Forrester (1633)	George Forrester, 5th Lord Forrester	1705	1727	
Lord Bargany (1641)	William Hamilton, 3rd Lord Bargany	1693	1712	
Lord Banff (1642)	George Ogilvy, 3rd Lord Banff	1668	1713	
Lord Elibank (1643)	Alexander Murray, 4th Lord Elibank	1687	1736	
Lord Falconer of Halkerton (1646)	David Falconer, 3rd Lord Falconer of Halkerton	1684	1724	
Lord Belhaven and Stenton (1647)	John Hamilton, 2nd Lord Belhaven and Stenton	1679	1708	
Lord Carmichael (1647)	John Carmichael, 2nd Lord Carmichael	1672	1710	Created Earl of Hyndford, see above
Lord Duffus (1650)	James Sutherland, 2nd Lord Duffus	1674	1705	Died
Lord Duffus (1650)	Kenneth Sutherland, 3rd Lord Duffus	1705	1734	
Lord Rollo (1651)	Andrew Rollo, 3rd Lord Rollo	1669	1700	Died
Lord Rollo (1651)	Robert Rollo, 4th Lord Rollo	1700	1758	
Lord Ruthven of Freeland (1650)	David Ruthven, 2nd Lord Ruthven of Freeland	1673	1701	Died
Lord Ruthven of Freeland (1650)	Jean Ruthven, 3rd Lady Ruthven of Freeland	1701	1722	
Lord Rutherfurd (1661)	Robert Rutherfurd, 4th Lord Rutherfurd	1685	1724	
Lord Bellenden (1661)	John Bellenden, 2nd Lord Bellenden	1671	1707	Died
Lord Bellenden (1661)	John Bellenden, 3rd Lord Bellenden	1707	1741	
Lord Nairne (1681)	William Murray, 2nd Lord Nairne	1683	1716	
Lord Kinnaird (1682)	Patrick Kinnaird, 2nd Lord Kinnaird	1689	1701	Died
Lord Kinnaird (1682)	Patrick Kinnaird, 3rd Lord Kinnaird	1701	1715	
Lord Glasford (1685)	Francis Abercromby, Lord Glasford	1685	1703	Died, title extinct
Lord Boyle of Kelburn, Stewartoun, Cumbrae, Finnick, Largs and Dalry (1699)	David Boyle, 1st Lord Boyle of Kelburn, Stewartoun, Cumbrae, Finnick, Largs and Dalry	1699	1733	Created Earl of Glasgow, see above
Lord Portmore and Blackness (1699)	David Colyear, 1st Lord Portmore and Blackness	1699	1730	Created Earl of Portmore, see above

== Peerage of Ireland ==
Title	Holder	Date gained	Date lost	Notes
Duke of Ormonde (1661)	James Butler, 2nd Duke of Ormonde	1688	1715	
Duke of Leinster (1691)	Meinhard Schomberg, 1st Duke of Leinster	1691	1719	
Earl of Kildare (1316)	John FitzGerald, 18th Earl of Kildare	1664	1707	
Earl of Waterford (1446)	Charles Talbot, 12th Earl of Waterford	1667	1718	
Earl of Clanricarde (1543)	Richard Burke, 8th Earl of Clanricarde	1687	1708	
Earl of Thomond (1543)	Henry O'Brien, 8th Earl of Thomond	1691	1741	
Earl of Castlehaven (1616)	James Tuchet, 5th Earl of Castlehaven	1686	1700	Died
Earl of Castlehaven (1616)	James Tuchet, 6th Earl of Castlehaven	1700	1740	
Earl of Cork (1620)	Charles Boyle, 3rd Earl of Cork	1698	1703	Died
Earl of Cork (1620)	Richard Boyle, 4th Earl of Cork	1703	1753	
Earl of Antrim (1620)	Randal MacDonnell, 4th Earl of Antrim	1699	1721	
Earl of Westmeath (1621)	Richard Nugent, 3rd Earl of Westmeath	1684	1714	
Earl of Roscommon (1622)	Robert Dillon, 6th Earl of Roscommon	1689	1715	
Earl of Londonderry (1622)	Robert Ridgeway, 4th Earl of Londonderry	1672	1714	
Earl of Meath (1627)	Edward Brabazon, 4th Earl of Meath	1685	1707	Died
Earl of Meath (1627)	Chambre Brabazon, 5th Earl of Meath	1707	1715	
Earl of Barrymore (1628)	James Barry, 4th Earl of Barrymore	1699	1747	
Earl of Carbery (1628)	John Vaughan, 3rd Earl of Carbery	1687	1713	
Earl of Fingall (1628)	Peter Plunkett, 4th Earl of Fingall	1684	1718	
Earl of Desmond (1628)	Basil Feilding, 3rd Earl of Desmond	1685	1717	
Earl of Donegall (1647)	Arthur Chichester, 3rd Earl of Donegall	1678	1706	Died
Earl of Donegall (1647)	Arthur Chichester, 4th Earl of Donegall	1706	1757	
Earl of Cavan (1647)	Charles Lambart, 3rd Earl of Cavan	1690	1702	Died
Earl of Cavan (1647)	Richard Lambart, 4th Earl of Cavan	1702	1742	
Earl of Inchiquin (1654)	William O'Brien, 2nd Earl of Inchiquin	1674	1692	Died
Earl of Inchiquin (1654)	William O'Brien, 3rd Earl of Inchiquin	1692	1719	
Earl of Orrery (1660)	Lionel Boyle, 3rd Earl of Orrery	1682	1703	Died
Earl of Orrery (1660)	Charles Boyle, 4th Earl of Orrery	1703	1731	
Earl of Mountrath (1660)	Charles Coote, 3rd Earl of Mountrath	1672	1709	
Earl of Drogheda (1661)	Henry Hamilton-Moore, 3rd Earl of Drogheda	1679	1714	
Earl of Carlingford (1661)	Francis Taaffe, 3rd Earl of Carlingford	1690	1704	Died
Earl of Carlingford (1661)	Theobald Taaffe, 4th Earl of Carlingford	1704	1738	
Earl of Mount Alexander (1661)	Hugh Montgomery, 2nd Earl of Mount Alexander	1663	1717	
Earl of Castlemaine (1661)	Roger Palmer, 1st Earl of Castlemaine	1661	1705	Died, title extinct
Earl of Tyrone (1673)	James Power, 3rd Earl of Tyrone	1693	1704	Died, title extinct
Earl of Longford (1677)	Francis Aungier, 1st Earl of Longford	1677	1700	Died
Earl of Longford (1677)	Ambrose Aungier, 2nd Earl of Longford	1700	1706	Died, title extinct
Earl of Ranelagh (1677)	Richard Jones, 1st Earl of Ranelagh	1677	1711	
Earl of Granard (1684)	Arthur Forbes, 2nd Earl of Granard	1695	1734	
Earl of Limerick (1686)	Thomas Dongan, 2nd Earl of Limerick	1698	1715	
Earl of Bellomont (1689)	Richard Coote, 1st Earl of Bellomont	1683	1701	Died
Earl of Bellomont (1689)	Nanfan Coote, 2nd Earl of Bellomont	1701	1708	
Earl of Athlone (1692)	Godert de Ginkel, 1st Earl of Athlone	1692	1703	Died
Earl of Athlone (1692)	Frederick Christiaan van Reede, 2nd Earl of Athlone	1703	1719	
Earl of Arran (1693)	Charles Butler, 1st Earl of Arran	1693	1758	
Earl of Galway (1697)	Henri de Massue, Earl of Galway	1697	1720	
Viscount Mountgarret (1550)	Richard Butler, 5th Viscount Mountgarret	1679	1706	Died
Viscount Mountgarret (1550)	Edmund Butler, 6th Viscount Mountgarret	1706	1735	
Viscount Grandison (1621)	John Villiers, 5th Viscount Grandison	1699	1766	
Viscount Valentia (1622)	James Annesley, 4th Viscount Valentia	1690	1702	Died
Viscount Valentia (1622)	John Annesley, 5th Viscount Valentia	1702	1710	
Viscount Dillon (1622)	Henry Dillon, 8th Viscount Dillon	1690	1713	
Viscount Loftus (1622)	Arthur Loftus, 3rd Viscount Loftus	1680	1725	
Viscount Beaumont of Swords (1622)	Thomas Beaumont, 3rd Viscount Beaumont of Swords	1658	1702	Died, title extinct
Viscount Netterville (1622)	John Netterville, 4th Viscount Netterville	1689	1727	
Viscount Kilmorey (1625)	Robert Needham, 7th Viscount Kilmorey	1687	1710	
Viscount Castleton (1627)	George Saunderson, 5th Viscount Castleton	1650	1714	
Viscount Mayo (1627)	Theobald Bourke, 6th Viscount Mayo	1681	1741	
Viscount Lumley (1628)	Richard Lumley, 2nd Viscount Lumley	1663	1721	
Viscount Molyneux (1628)	William Molyneux, 4th Viscount Molyneux	1699	1717	
Viscount Strangford (1628)	Philip Smythe, 2nd Viscount Strangford	1635	1708	
Viscount Scudamore (1628)	James Scudamore, 3rd Viscount Scudamore	1697	1716	
Viscount Wenman (1628)	Richard Wenman, 5th Viscount Wenman	1690	1728	
Viscount FitzWilliam (1629)	Thomas FitzWilliam, 4th Viscount FitzWilliam	1670	1704	Died
Viscount FitzWilliam (1629)	Richard FitzWilliam, 5th Viscount FitzWilliam	1704	1743	
Viscount Fairfax of Emley (1629)	Charles Fairfax, 5th Viscount Fairfax of Emley	1651	1711	
Viscount Ikerrin (1629)	Pierce Butler, 4th Viscount Ikerrin	1688	1711	
Viscount Cullen (1642)	Charles Cokayne, 4th Viscount Cullen	1687	1716	
Viscount Carrington (1643)	Francis Smith, 2nd Viscount Carrington	1665	1701	Died
Viscount Carrington (1643)	Charles Smith, 3rd Viscount Carrington	1701	1706	Died, title extinct
Viscount Tracy (1643)	William Tracy, 4th Viscount Tracy	1687	1712	
Viscount Bulkeley (1644)	Richard Bulkeley, 3rd Viscount Bulkeley	1688	1704	Died
Viscount Bulkeley (1644)	Richard Bulkeley, 4th Viscount Bulkeley	1704	1724	
Viscount Barnewall (1646)	Nicholas Barnewall, 3rd Viscount Barnewall	1688	1725	
Viscount Massereene (1660)	Clotworthy Skeffington, 3rd Viscount Massereene	1695	1714	
Viscount Shannon (1660)	Richard Boyle, 2nd Viscount Shannon	1699	1740	
Viscount Fanshawe (1661)	Charles Fanshawe, 4th Viscount Fanshawe	1687	1710	
Viscount Cholmondeley (1661)	Hugh Cholmondeley, 2nd Viscount Cholmondeley	1681	1725	Created Earl of Cholmondeley, see above
Viscount Dungannon (1662)	Marcus Trevor, 3rd Viscount Dungannon	1693	1706	Died, title extinct
Viscount Fitzhardinge (1663)	John Berkeley, 4th Viscount Fitzhardinge	1690	1712	
Viscount Charlemont (1665)	William Caulfeild, 2nd Viscount Charlemont	1671	1726	
Viscount Powerscourt (1665)	Folliott Wingfield, 1st Viscount Powerscourt	1665	1717	
Viscount Blesington (1673)	Murrough Boyle, 1st Viscount Blesington	1673	1718	
Viscount Lanesborough (1676)	James Lane, 2nd Viscount Lanesborough	1683	1724	
Viscount Downe (1680)	Henry Dawnay, 2nd Viscount Downe	1695	1741	
Viscount Rosse (1681)	Richard Parsons, 1st Viscount Rosse	1681	1703	Died
Viscount Rosse (1681)	Richard Parsons, 2nd Viscount Rosse	1703	1741	
Viscount Mountjoy (1683)	William Stewart, 2nd Viscount Mountjoy	1692	1728	
Viscount Lisburne (1695)	John Vaughan, 1st Viscount Lisburne	1695	1721	
Viscount Windsor (1699)	Thomas Windsor, 1st Viscount Windsor	1699	1738	
Viscount Howe (1701)	Scrope Howe, 1st Viscount Howe	1701	1713	New creation
Viscount Fermanagh (1703)	John Verney, 1st Viscount Fermanagh	1703	1717	New creation
Viscount Doneraile (1703)	Arthur St Leger, 1st Viscount Doneraile	1703	1727	New creation
Viscount Mount Cashell (1706)	Paul Davys, 1st Viscount Mount Cashell	1706	1716	New creation
Baron Athenry (1172)	Edward Bermingham, 13th Baron Athenry	1677	1709	
Baron Kingsale (1223)	Almericus de Courcy, 23rd Baron Kingsale	1669	1720	
Baron Kerry (1223)	Thomas Fitzmaurice, 21st Baron Kerry	1697	1741	
Baron Howth (1425)	Thomas St Lawrence, 13th Baron Howth	1671	1727	
Baron Trimlestown (1461)	John Barnewall, 11th Baron Trimlestown	1692	1746	
Baron Dunsany (1462)	Randall Plunkett, 11th Baron of Dunsany	1690	1735	
Baron Dunboyne (1541)	James Butler, 6th/16th Baron Dunboyne	1690	1701	Died
Baron Dunboyne (1541)	Pierce Butler, 7th/17th Baron Dunboyne	1701	1718	
Baron Cahir (1583)	Theobald Butler, 5th Baron Cahir	1676	1700	Died
Baron Cahir (1583)	Thomas Butler, 6th Baron Cahir	1700	1744	
Baron Hamilton (1617)	Charles Hamilton, 6th Baron Hamilton of Strabane	1692	1701	Died
Baron Hamilton (1617)	James Hamilton, 7th Baron Hamilton of Strabane	1692	1701	
Baron Folliot (1620)	Henry Folliott, 3rd Baron Folliott	1697	1716	
Baron Maynard (1620)	Banastre Maynard, 3rd Baron Maynard	1699	1718	
Baron Gorges of Dundalk (1620)	Richard Gorges, 2nd Baron Gorges of Dundalk	1650	1712	
Baron Digby (1620)	William Digby, 5th Baron Digby	1685	1752	
Baron Fitzwilliam (1620)	William Fitzwilliam, 3rd Baron Fitzwilliam	1658	1719	
Baron Blayney (1621)	William Blayney, 6th Baron Blayney	1689	1705	Died
Baron Blayney (1621)	Cadwallader Blayney, 7th Baron Blayney	1705	1732	
Baron Brereton (1624)	John Brereton, 4th Baron Brereton	1680	1718	
Baron Baltimore (1625)	Charles Calvert, 3rd Baron Baltimore	1675	1715	
Baron Coleraine (1625)	Henry Hare, 2nd Baron Coleraine	1667	1708	
Baron Sherard (1627)	Bennet Sherard, 2nd Baron Sherard	1640	1700	
Baron Sherard (1627)	Bennet Sherard, 3rd Baron Sherard	1700	1732	
Baron Alington (1642)	Hildebrand Alington, 5th Baron Alington	1691	1723	
Baron Hawley (1646)	Francis Hawley, 2nd Baron Hawley	1684	1743	
Baron Kingston (1660)	John King, 3rd Baron Kingston	1693	1728	
Baron Barry of Santry (1661)	Henry Barry, 3rd Baron Barry of Santry	1694	1734	
Baron Altham (1681)	James George Annesley, 2nd Baron Altham	1699	1700	Died
Baron Altham (1681)	Richard Annesley, 3rd Baron Altham	1700	1701	Died
Baron Altham (1681)	Arthur Annesley, 4th Baron Altham	1701	1728	
Baron Bellew of Duleek (1686)	Richard Bellew, 3rd Baron Bellew of Duleek	1694	1715	
Baron Shelburne (1688)	Elizabeth Petty, Baroness Shelburne	1688	1708	
Baron Cutts of Gowran (1690)	John Cutts, 1st Baron Cutts	1690	1707	Died, title extinct
Baron Coningsby (1692)	Thomas Coningsby, 1st Baron Coningsby	1692	1729	
Baron Shelburne (1699)	Henry Petty, 1st Baron Shelburne	1699	1751	
Baron Pierrepont (1702)	Gervase Pierrepont, 1st Baron Pierrepont	1702	1715	New creation
Baron Tyrawley (1706)	Charles O'Hara, 1st Baron Tyrawley	1706	1724	New creation

Preceded by List of peers 1690–1699	Lists of peers by decade 1700–1707	Succeeded by List of peers 1707–1720
