= Thomas Gape =

Thomas Gape may refer to:

- Thomas Gape (Great Bedwyn MP), member of parliament for Great Bedwyn, 1660
- Thomas Gape (St Albans MP), member of parliament for St Albans, 1730–1732
