= John Hamilton, 1st Lord Bargany =

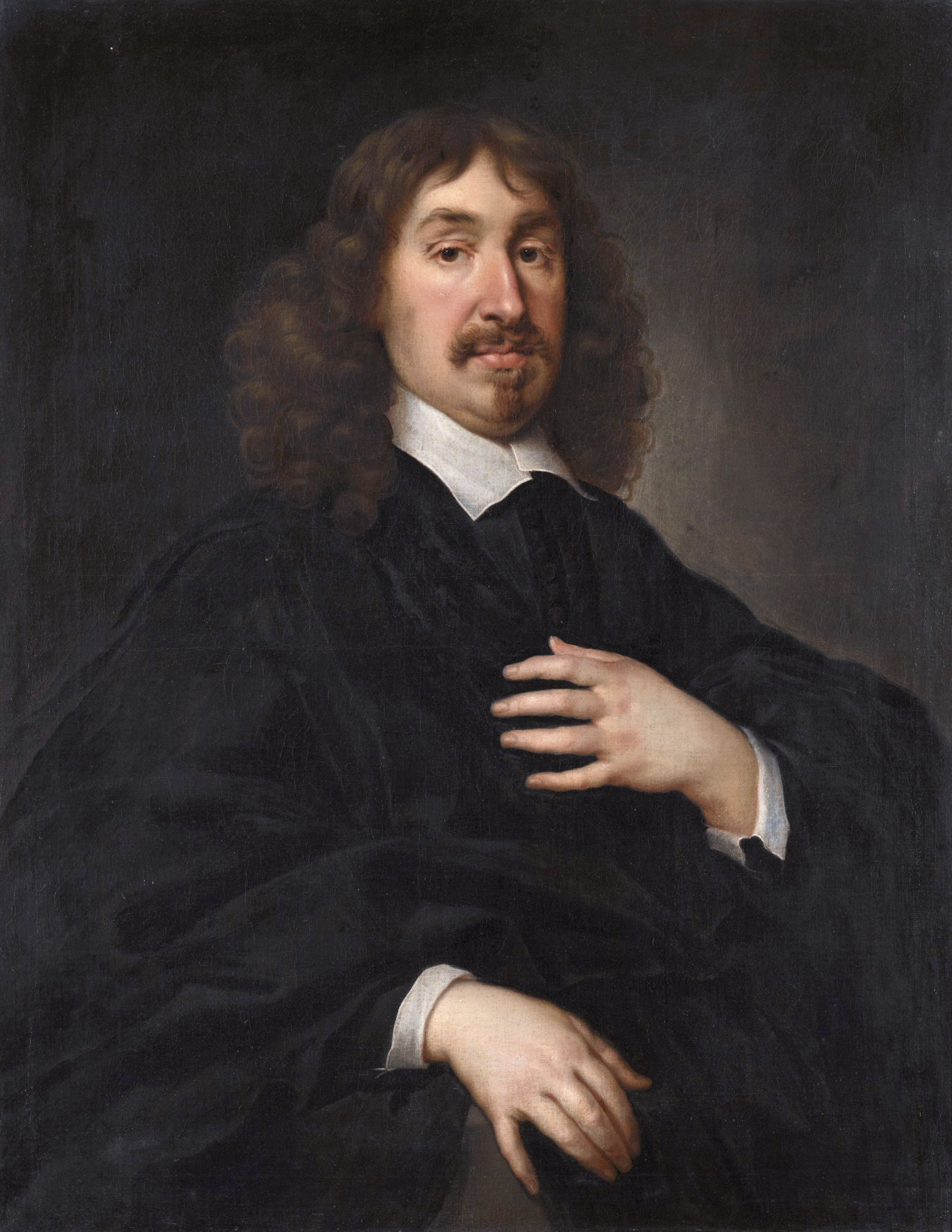
Portrait of Lord Bargany by Cornelis Johnson

John Hamilton, 1st Lord Bargany (died 1658) was a Scottish peer.

== Biography ==
He was the eldest son of Sir John Hamilton of Lettrick and his wife Jean, daughter of Alexander Campbell, Bishop of Brechin. His father, a natural son of John Hamilton, 1st Marquess of Hamilton, had a charter of the lands of Bargany in Ayrshire in 1624 and died soon after 1637; during his father's lifetime John was known as Hamilton of Carriden. In 1632 he married Jean, daughter of William Douglas, 1st Marquess of Douglas; they had two sons and five daughters.

Hamilton was created Lord Bargany in the Peerage of Scotland on 16 November 1641 and was served heir to his father on 23 April 1642. He sat in the Convention of Estates of 1643 and the Parliaments of 1644 and 1648. He supported King Charles I during the Civil War, and raised a regiment of foot for the Duke of Hamilton's expedition into England in 1648. After Hamilton's defeat at Preston Bargany was held prisoner for a year. He then joined King Charles II in the Netherlands, and during the 1651 invasion of England was sent to raise troops in the north of Scotland. After Charles was defeated at Worcester Bargany was again taken prisoner, and held in the Tower of London for about a year. He was excepted from Cromwell's Act of Grace in 1654. He died in April 1658, and his eldest son John was served heir after the Restoration. His widow died in 1669.

Peerage of Scotland
New creation	Lord Bargany; 1641–1658	Succeeded by John Hamilton
