= List of vice-admirals of Orkney and Shetland =

This is a list of the vice-admirals of Orkney and Shetland.

The Vice-Admiral of Orkney and Shetland was originally a heritable post, in the hands of the Earls of Morton, which conferred the power of judicature over the maritime affairs of the islands. In 1747 the Earl gave up his heritable rights to the crown in return for a cash payment. The post then became a commission granted by the Crown to a nobleman of the country.

== Vice-admirals of Orkney and Shetland ==
- 1707–1715 James Douglas, 11th Earl of Morton
- 1715–1728 John Sutherland, 16th Earl of Sutherland
- 1728–1730 Robert Douglas, 12th Earl of Morton
- 1730–1738 George Douglas, 13th Earl of Morton
- 1738–1767 James Douglas, 14th Earl of Morton
- 1767–1761 Sir Lawrence Dundas, 1st Baronet
- 1781–1820 Sir Thomas Dundas, 2nd Baronet
- 1823–?1845 James Allan Maconochie (died 1845) (also Sheriff-Depute of Orkney and Shetland 1822–?1845)
- 1845– Charles Neaves (also Sheriff-Depute 1845–1852)
- 1853– William Edmonstoune Aytoun (also Sheriff-Depute 1852–1865)
