= John Hamilton, 2nd Lord Bargany =

John Hamilton, 2nd Lord Bargany, (c. 1640 – 15 May 1693) was a Scottish peer whose family fortunes were deeply implicated in the struggles over Presbyterianism and the Church of England during the Interregnum and the Monmouth Rebellion. He was accused of treason and cleared of charges.

== Life ==
His family suffered during the English Civil War. His father, also John Hamilton (first Lord Bargany), took the Parliamentarian side before the Civil War but joined with his cousin William Hamilton, 2nd Duke of Hamilton, on the Cavalier side in 1648. Parliament seized his estates, fining him £2,000 for their return because of his royalist efforts. The eldest of seven children, John Hamilton assumed the title in 1662, after the death of his father. After the Restoration, the elder Bargany, and then the son, petitioned for the return of the fine, to no avail. Hamilton married Lady Margaret Cunningham, the daughter of the Lord Chancellor of Scotland the year he took his title. His family itself split in loyalties, with the women generally favoring Presbyterianism and the men generally the Established church, and this made him a figure of suspicion throughout his life.

Hamilton was aggressively anti-Puritan, and in 1666 he led a company in battle against the Presbyters at Rullion Green. The next year, his wife having died, he married again. This wife proved scandalous and disastrous for Hamilton. He made the match no doubt to try to get money, as he married Lady Alice, the widow of a man who had amassed a significant illicit fortune. She brought with her also a lover, Lord Berkeley. He, in turn, attempted to make her one of Charles II of England's mistresses in 1676. She died in 1677. Hamilton and she had apparently not been a very close couple, as he lost his suit for the monies left to her in her former husband's will, and he lost the £3,000 he had paid to settle her debts upon marriage.

In 1678, Hamilton moved into opposition. However, he was not a supporter of the Presbyterian Covenanters, and he led forces in the Battle of Bothwell Bridge against the Puritan rebels. However, he had a neighbor in Ayrshire named James Crawfuird. This man was responsible for hunting down and imprisoning rebel Covenanter forces. However, he and his sons were in the habit of accepting bribes from their prisoners, in money, bonds, and labor, and letting them escape. Crawfuird was sheltering Thomas Cunningham, a rebel leader, and he feared Hamilton's revealing this fact, and so he bribed numerous witnesses to get them to swear that Hamilton was a traitor. They accused him of corresponding with John Welsh, sponsoring the uprising at Bothwell Bridge, and of paying to have the Duke of Lauderdale assassinated. Hamilton was imprisoned, but James, Duke of York had the trial abridged. Hamilton was released on bond, and he began to investigate the perjury. However, the Duke of York put an end to that, as well.

In 1682, Hamilton accumulated evidence that Crawfiurd was again accepting bribes to release prisoners and moved to have him arrested. Crawfiurd (who was Lord Armillan) was arrested, but he and two of his sons fled the country in 1684. Hamilton was given Ardmillan's old job and was put in charge of rounding up rebels.

Also in 1684, Hamilton's lover, Sylvia Johnstone, sued him. She had had a child by him, a bastard that Hamilton acknowledged, and she wanted maintenance for herself and son. Therefore, she sued for seduction under promise of marriage. As Hamilton was in control of the courts, he had the venue changed to one favorable to himself, and so he prevailed in the lawsuit.

He was in favor of William of Orange in the Glorious Revolution and offered a regiment of infantry to William for his cause in Ireland. The soldiers were accepted and blended into another regiment. He died 15 May 1693.

== Family ==
By his first wife, Lady Margaret Cunningham, second daughter of William Cunningham, 9th Earl of Glencairn, lord high chancellor of Scotland, Bargany had two sons and one daughter:

- John, master of Bargany, who married Jean (daughter of Sir Robert Sinclair, 1st Baronet) but predeceased his father without a male heir
- William Hamilton, 3rd Lordy Bargany
- Nicolas, married, April 1690, to Sir Alexander Hope of Kerse, Bart., and had a son, Sir Alexander Hope of Kerse.

By his second wife, Lady Alice Moore, eldest daughter of Henry, first earl of Drogheda, dowager of Henry Hamilton, second earl of Clanbrassill, he had no issue.

Peerage of Scotland
Preceded by John Hamilton	Lord Bargany; 1662–1693	Succeeded by William Hamilton
