= Robert Spencer, 1st Viscount Teviot =

English politician (1629–1694)

Robert Spencer, 1st Viscount Teviot (baptised 2 February 1629 – 20 May 1694), styled The Honourable Robert Spencer until 1685, was an English politician from the Spencer family who sat in the House of Commons from 1660 to 1679.

== Biography ==
Spencer was born at Althorp, a younger son of William Spencer, 2nd Baron Spencer of Wormleighton, and his wife Lady Penelope Wriothesley, daughter of Henry Wriothesley, 3rd Earl of Southampton. Henry Spencer, 1st Earl of Sunderland was his elder brother. He studied at Christ Church, Oxford and was admitted at King's College, Cambridge in 1646. He also studied at the University of Padua in 1648 while travelling in France and Italy, returning to England in 1651. He was made Doctor of Civil Law (DCL) at Oxford in 1669.

In 1660, Spencer was elected Member of Parliament for Great Bedwyn in the Convention Parliament. In 1661, he was elected MP for Brackley in the Cavalier Parliament and sat until 1679.

He held a number of offices as: commissioner of assessment of taxes in Northamptonshire (1661–74) and Middlesex (1664–69); commissioner for excise appeals (1663–89), joint farmer of Barbados sugar duties (1670–77) and commissioner of the Privy Seal (1685–87).

He was created Viscount Teviot in the Peerage of Scotland on 10 October 1685.

Spencer married Jane Spencer, daughter of Sir Thomas Spencer of Yarnton, Oxon. Children include Elizabeth Long (née Spencer), Ann Rowland (née Spencer), James Henry Spencer, and Mary Spriggs (née Spencer).

Parliament of England
Preceded by Edmund Harvey; Vacant	Member of Parliament for Great Bedwyn; 1660–1661; With: Thomas Gape	Succeeded by Duke Stonehouse; Henry Clerke
Preceded by Sir Thomas Crew; William Lisle	Member of Parliament for Brackley; 1661–1679; With: Sir Thomas Crew	Succeeded by Sir Thomas Crew; William Lisle
Peerage of Scotland
New creation	Viscount Teviot; 1685–1694	Extinct
