= Thomas Gape (Great Bedwyn MP) =

Member of the Parliament of England

Thomas Gape (died 1678) was an English lawyer, administrator and politician who sat in the House of Commons in 1660.

Gape was the son of Hugh Gape, a weaver, of Dorchester, Dorset. He became servant to the Marquis of Hertford in 1646. He entered Middle Temple in 1648 and by 1660 he was steward of the manorial court of Great Bedwyn, Wiltshire. He was instructed by his employer to stand as member of parliament for Great Bedwyn in April 1660 and was blamed for the "hot contest" and double return that followed. He was allowed to sit in the Convention Parliament on the merits of the return. He was commissioner for assessment for Wiltshire from August 1660 to 1661, and clerk of the peace for Somerset from August 1660 to about 1673.

When the Duke of Somerset died in October 1660, Gape became servant to the dowager duchess. He was commissioner for assessment for Wiltshire from 1664 to 1669. He claimed penury from service to the Seymours. In 1666 he wrote that he did not dare to leave his employer's house in London for fear of a debtors' prison, and on 18 January 1667 he wrote "In above twenty years, I have not been able to make any considerable provision for my wife and children, notwithstanding my diligent performances in this noble family". He was called to the bar in 1667 and remained in the service of the duchess until 1674. She owed him £1,250 when she died and in 1677 he spent £3,750 on the purchase of land in Wiltshire.

When he died at Porton, Wiltshire in 1678, he left £1,000 portions to his two unmarried daughters, and his coach and horses to his wife. He had married Anne Backhouse, daughter of William Backhouse of London and had two sons (of whom one died young and the other was lunatic) and four daughters. His wife died on 29 April 1686.

Parliament of England
Preceded by Colonel Edmund Harvey	Member of Parliament for Great Bedwyn; 1660; With: Robert Spencer	Succeeded by Duke Stonehouse; Henry Clerke
