= Baron Griffin =

The title of Baron Griffin of Braybrooke was created in the Peerage of England by King James II on 3 December 1688 for the soldier Edward Griffin, son of Sir Edward Griffin whom he had succeeded as Treasurer of the Chamber in 1679. He was married to Lady Essex Howard, eldest daughter of James Howard, 3rd Earl of Suffolk, and later the senior co-heiress to the barony of Howard de Walden. At the Glorious Revolution Lord Griffin went into exile with James II, and was taken prisoner during the attempted invasion of Scotland in 1708. He died in the Tower of London two years later. His son James, a Catholic convert who had represented Brackley in the last Parliament of James II, did not assume the title, but James's son Edward conformed to the Church of England and took his seat in the House of Lords in 1727. He died in 1742, when the title became extinct. His nephew John Griffin Whitwell took the surname of Griffin in 1749 and inherited Audley End, Saffron Walden, from his aunt Elizabeth (sister of the 3rd Baron Griffin) in 1762. The abeyance of the barony of Howard de Walden was terminated in his favour in 1784 and the Braybrooke title was revived when he was created Baron Braybrooke in 1788.

== Barons Griffin of Braybrooke (1688) ==
- Edward Griffin, 1st Baron Griffin (c. 1630–1710)
- James Griffin, de jure 2nd Baron Griffin (1667–1715)
- Edward Griffin, 3rd Baron Griffin (1693–1742)
