= Viscount Teviot =

Viscount Teviot was a title that was created twice in the Peerage of Scotland. The first creation was on 20 October 1685 for the Honourable Robert Spencer of the Spencer family. He was the son of William Spencer, 2nd Baron Spencer of Wormleighton and younger brother of Henry Spencer, 1st Earl of Sunderland. It became extinct upon his suicide in 1694.

The second creation was for Sir Thomas Livingstone, Viscount Teviot, on 4 December 1696; he was at the same time created Lord Livingstone of Peebles. Lord William Douglas, son of the Duke of Queensberry) was created Earl of March and Viscount Peebles on 20 April 1697. Livingstone unsuccessfully protested and a second patent was issued on 19 June 1698, this time as Lord Livingstone of Hyndford. Both titles became extinct upon his death in 1711.

== Viscounts Teviot (1685) ==
- Robert Spencer, 1st Viscount Teviot (1629–1694)

== Viscounts Teviot (1696) ==
- Sir Thomas Livingstone, Viscount Teviot (1651–1711)

== Bibliography ==
- Paul, James Balfour (1904). The Scots Peerage: Founded on Wood's Edition of Sir Robert Douglas's Peerage of Scotland, Containing an Historical and Genealogical Account of the Nobility of That Kingdom. Vol. 8. Edinburgh: David Douglas.
