= William Douglas, 1st Earl of March =

William Douglas, 1st Earl of March (1673–1705) was the second son of the William Douglas, 1st Duke of Queensberry.

In 1697 the 4th creation of the Earldom of March was created for him. He was also created Lord Douglas of Neidpath, Lyne and Munard, and Viscount of Peebles, with remainder to heirs male of his body, failing which to his other heirs male and of tailzie.

His most significant public role came in 1702, when he was appointed Governor of Edinburgh Castle, a post that placed him at the centre of national security during the tense years preceding the debates that would lead to the Union of 1707.

In 1702 he oversaw the construction of the Manor Bridge, a single‑arch stone crossing of the Manor Water near Peebles. This improvement formed part of the wider development of the Neidpath estate, the seat of the March earls.

He was succeeded by his son, also William, who married Anne Hamilton, 2nd Countess of Ruglen.

They were both succeeded by their son, another William, who became 3rd Earl of March and 3rd Earl of Ruglen.

== Source ==
- McNeill, Ronald John (1911). "March, Earls of" . In Chisholm, Hugh (ed.). Encyclopædia Britannica. Vol. 17 (11th ed.). Cambridge University Press. pp. 685–688.
