= Lord Bargany =

Lord Bargany was a title created in the nobility of Scotland on 14 November 1639 for Sir John Hamilton of Carriden, only son of Sir John Hamilton of Letterick, natural son of John, first marquis of Hamilton.

This peerage was created with limitation to the heirs male of the first lord's body. The title became dormant or extinct after the death in 1736 of the 4th Lord Bargany, James Hamilton and the Bargany estate passed to John Dalrymple, who changed his name to Hamilton.

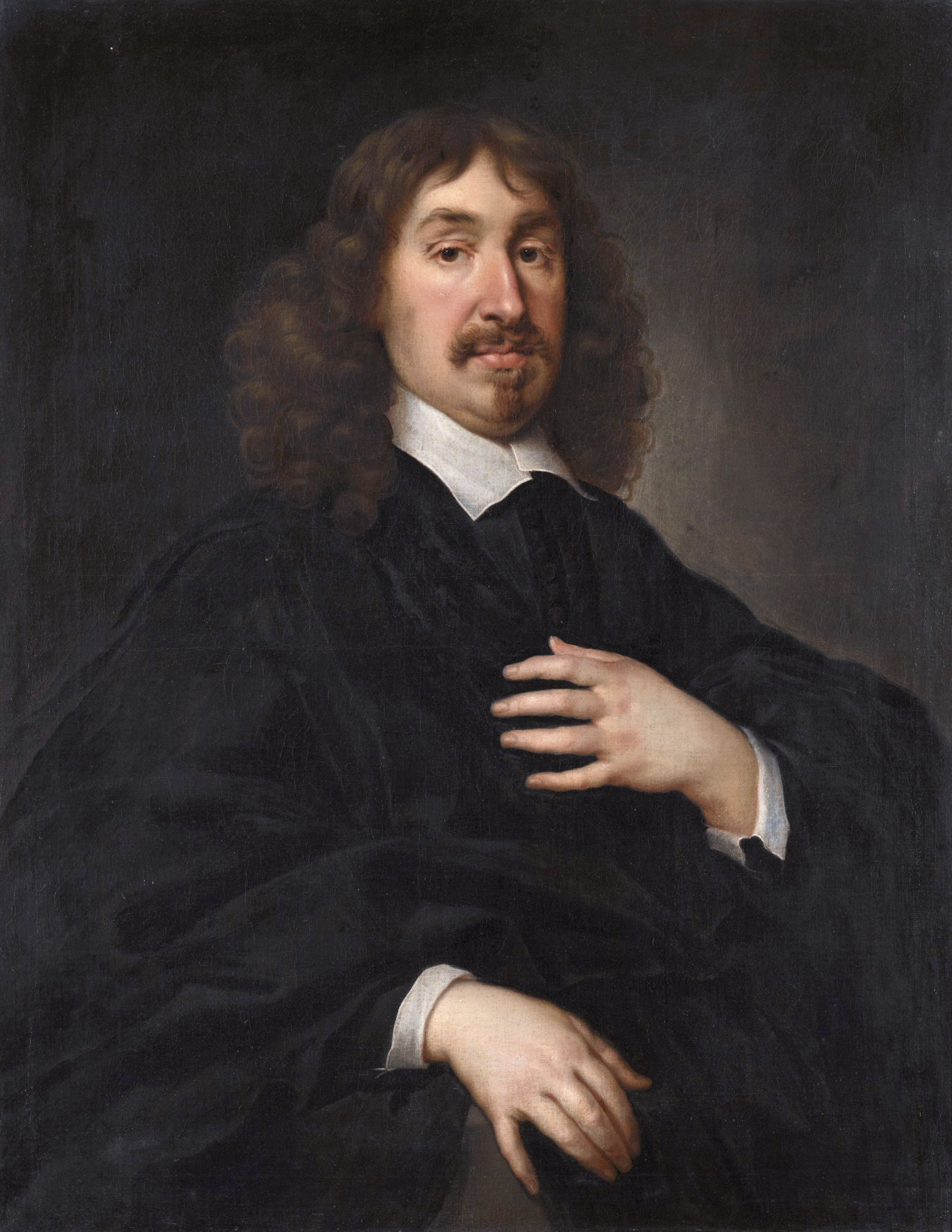
John Hamilton, 1st Lord Bargany (Cornelis Janssens van Ceulen)

== Lords Bargeny (1639) ==
- John Hamilton, 1st Lord Bargany (died 1658)
- John Hamilton, 2nd Lord Bargany (died 1693)
- William Hamilton, 3rd Lord Bargany (died 1712)
- James Hamilton, 4th Lord Bargany (born 1710, died 1736)
