= James Douglas, 11th Earl of Morton =

James Douglas was the 11th Earl of Morton (d. December 7, 1715)

He was a Lord Lieutenant of Orkney and Shetland and a Vice-Admiral of Orkney and Shetland.

He was the second son of Sir James Douglas, 10th Earl of Morton and succeeded his father in 1686.

He was one of the Commissioners who negotiated the Treaty of Union in 1707 and was a Privy Councillor for Queen Anne. He successfully recovered the islands of Orkney and Shetland for the Morton family, overturning an Act of 1669.

He campaigned for much of his life to restore his family's traditional holdings in Orkney and Shetland.

He died in 1715. As he was unmarried the titles passed to his younger brother.
