= Walter Warner =

Walter Warner (1563–1643) was an English mathematician and scientist.

== Life ==
He was born in Leicestershire and educated at Merton College, Oxford, graduating B.A. in 1578.

At the end of the sixteenth century he belonged to the circle round Henry Percy, 9th Earl of Northumberland, the 'Wizard Earl'. The Earl's ‘three magi’ were Warner, Thomas Harriot and Robert Hues. Percy paid Warner a retainer to help him with alchemical experiments (£20 per annum in 1595, rising to £40 in 1607). He also belonged to the overlapping group around Sir Walter Raleigh. At this time he was mainly known for chemical and medical interests. It has been argued by Jean Jacquot that this group of experimental researchers, sponsored by Percy and Raleigh, represents the transitional moment from the still-magical theories of Giordano Bruno to real science.

He may have been associated with Christopher Marlowe's study group on religion, branded atheists, but confusion is possible here with William Warner.

After Henry Percy's death, he was supported by Algernon Percy, 10th Earl of Northumberland, and then Sir Thomas Aylesbury. Warner edited Harriot's Artis Analyticae Praxis in 1631. He met Thomas Hobbes through Sir Charles Cavendish, who circulated Warner's works.

Warner was a friend of Robert Payne, chaplain to Cavendish; and this connection is frequently used to associate Warner with the Welbeck Academy. In 1634 Warner and Hobbes discussed refraction. This acquaintance was later brought up against Hobbes in the Hobbes-Wallis controversy.

With John Pell he computed the first table of antilogarithms in the 1630s. John Aubrey, relying on Pell's testimony, states that Warner had claimed to have anticipated William Harvey's discovery of the circulation of the blood, and that Harvey must have heard of it through a Mr Prothero. Pell also mentioned that Warner had been born without a left hand.

== Scientific work and legacy ==
Warner was unpublished in his lifetime, but well known, in particular to Marin Mersenne who published some of his optical work in Universae geometriae (1646). He was an atomist, and a believer in an infinite universe. He was both a theoretical and practical chemist, and wrote psychological works based on Bruno and Lullism. Many manuscripts of his survive, and show eclectic interests; they include works related to the circulation of the blood. Some of Warner's papers ended up in the Pell manuscripts collected by Richard Busby; after his death the bulk of his papers were seized in 1644 by superstitious sequestrators. George John Gray, writing in the Dictionary of National Biography, states that the table of 11-figure antilogarithms later published by James Dodson was believed to have passed to Herbert Thorndike, and then to Busby; Pell's account in 1644 was that Warner had been bankrupt, and the creditors were likely to destroy the work.
