= Ralph Montagu, 1st Duke of Montagu =

English courtier, diplomat, politician and peer (1638–1709)

His Grace Ralph Montagu
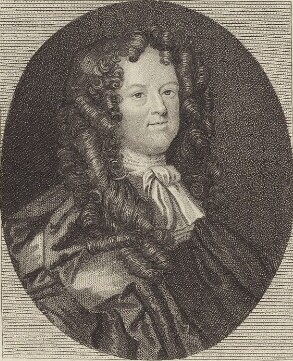
- Reign: 1705–1709
- Successor: John Montagu, 2nd Duke of Montagu
- Born: 24 December 1638
- Died: 9 March 1709 (aged 70)
- Noble family: Montagu
- Spouses: Elizabeth Percy, Countess of Northumberland; Elizabeth Monck, Duchess of Albemarle
- Issue: John Montagu, 2nd Duke of Montagu; Anne Montagu
- Father: Edward Montagu, 2nd Baron Montagu of Boughton
- Mother: Anne Winwood

Ralph Montagu, 1st Duke of Montagu (24 December 1638 – 9 March 1709) was an English courtier, diplomat and politician.

== Background ==
Ralph Montagu was the second son of Edward Montagu, 2nd Baron Montagu of Boughton (1616–1684), and Anne Winwood, daughter of the Secretary of State Ralph Winwood. The peerage of his father was one of several granted in the seventeenth century to different members of the Montagu family.

Sir Edward Montagu, Chief Justice of the King's Bench in the time of Henry VIII, was grandfather of the 1st Earl of Manchester, and of the 1st Baron Montagu of Boughton (1562–1644), who was imprisoned in the Tower by the Parliament on account of his loyalty to Charles I. The eldest son of the latter, Edward, who succeeded him as the 2nd Baron, took the side of the Parliament in the Civil War, and was one of the lords who conducted the king from Newark-on-Trent to Holmby House in January 1647, after he was handed over by the Scots, to whom he had initially surrendered, to the custody of Parliament. Sir Edward had two sons, Edward and Ralph.

== Career ==
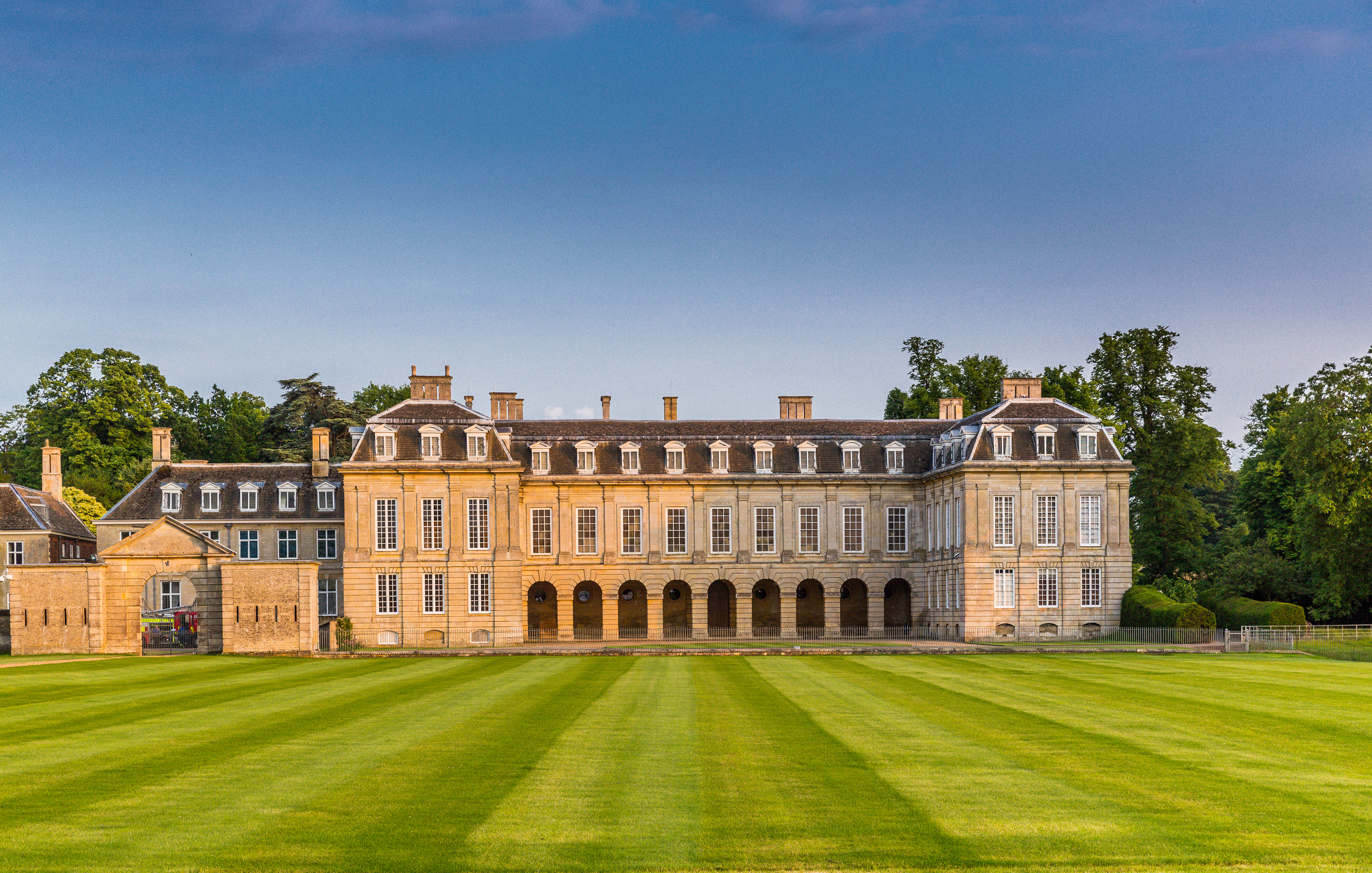
Boughton House – seat of the Dukes of Montagu

The elder son, Edward, was Master of the Horse to Queen Catherine, wife of Charles II, a post from which he is said to have been dismissed by the king for 'showing attention to the queen of too ardent a nature'. Catherine immediately appointed (in 1665) the younger brother, Ralph, to the vacant situation, and the latter soon acquired a reputation for gallantry at the court of Charles II. He took an active part in the negotiations in which Louis XIV purchased the neutrality or support of England in the war between France and the Netherlands. He was also appointed Master of the Great Wardrobe from 1671 to 1678 and from 1689 to his death.

Having quarrelled with Danby and the Duchess of Cleveland, who denounced him to the king, Montagu was elected member of Parliament for Northampton in 1678, with the intention of bringing about the fall of Danby; but, having produced letters seriously compromising the minister, the dissolution of Parliament placed him in such danger of arrest that he attempted to fly to France. Foiled in this design, he continued to intrigue against the government, supporting the movement for excluding the Duke of York from the succession and for recognizing the Duke of Monmouth as heir to the crown. After securing re-election to Parliament for Huntingdonshire in 1679 and again for Northampton in 1679 and 1681 his safety was then ensured by Parliamentary immunity. His elder brother having predeceased his father, Ralph became Baron Montagu of Boughton on the death of the latter in 1684.

Notwithstanding his former intrigues, Montagu gained the favour of King James II of England, on his accession to the throne; but this did not deter him from welcoming William of Orange, who created him Viscount Monthermer and Earl of Montagu later in 1689, on his accession to the English throne. Montagu was no less avaricious than unscrupulous. In 1673, he married Lady Elizabeth Wriothesley, the wealthy widow of Joceline Percy, 11th Earl of Northumberland and daughter of Thomas Wriothesley, 4th Earl of Southampton, who brought him a large fortune; and after her death in 1690, he remarried the still more wealthy Lady Elizabeth Cavendish, daughter of Henry Cavendish, 2nd Duke of Newcastle, and the widow of Christopher Monck, 2nd Duke of Albemarle.

Ralph Montagu's position was further strengthened in 1705 by the marriage of his son and heir to Mary, daughter of John Churchill, 1st Duke of Marlborough and Sarah Churchill, Duchess of Marlborough. In the same year he was created Duke of Montagu and Marquess of Monthermer. His London residence, Montagu House, Bloomsbury, was bought by the government in 1753 to hold the national collection of antiquities, and on its site was built the British Museum.

== Children ==
Montagu and his first wife Elizabeth Wriothesley were parents to two children:

- John Montagu, 2nd Duke of Montagu (c. 1690 – 5 July 1749).
- Anne Montagu, married Alexander Popham (grandson of Alexander Popham), and had a daughter, Elizabeth, (d. 20 March 1761), who married firstly Edward Montagu, Viscount Hinchingbrooke, and secondly Francis Seymour, of Sherborne, Dorset.

Montagu and his second wife Elizabeth Monck had no known children. However, through this marriage the 1st Duke of Montagu acquired the Lordship of Bowland, one of northern England's most powerful feudal lordships which on his death passed to John, the son of his first marriage.

== Royal Navy ==
The pre-dreadnought battleship HMS Montagu was named after him.

Court offices
| Preceded by The Earl of Sandwich | Master of the Great Wardrobe; 1671–1678 | Succeeded by The Viscount Preston |
| Preceded by The Viscount Preston | Master of the Great Wardrobe; 1689–1709 | Succeeded by The Duke of Montagu |
Parliament of England
| Preceded by Sir William Fermor; Lord Ibrackan | Member of Parliament for Northampton; 1678–1679; With: Sir William Fermor | Succeeded by Sir William Fermor; Sir Hugh Cholmeley |
| Preceded by Sir Nicholas Pedley; Robert Apreece | Member of Parliament for Huntingdonshire; 1679; With: Robert Apreece | Succeeded by Sir Thomas Proby, Bt; Silius Titus |
| Preceded by Sir William Fermor; Sir Hugh Cholmeley | Member of Parliament for Northampton; 1679–1683; With: Sir William Langham, Bt | Succeeded by Richard Rainsford; Sir Justinian Isham, Bt |
Peerage of England
| New creation | Duke of Montagu; 1705–1709 | Succeeded by John Montagu |
| New creation | Earl of Montagu; 1689–1709 | Succeeded by John Montagu |
| Preceded by Edward Montagu | Baron Montagu of Boughton; 1683–1709 | Succeeded by John Montagu |
