= James Dodson (mathematician) =

British mathematician and actuary (c. 1705 – 1757)

James Dodson FRS (c.1705–1757) was a British mathematician, actuary and innovator in the insurance industry.

== Life ==
Matthew Maty, in his Mémoire sur la vie et sur les écrits de M. A. de Moivre, wrote that Dodson was a pupil of Abraham de Moivre. He worked as an accountant and teacher. In 1752 George Parker, 2nd Earl of Macclesfield, a friend of Dodson, became President of the Royal Society, and Dodson was elected a Fellow on 16 January 1755. On 7 August of the same year he was elected master of the Royal Mathematical School, Christ's Hospital, and also of Stone's School there. Dodson died 23 November 1757, being then over fifty-two years of age. He lived at Bell Dock, Wapping.

== Actuarial legacy ==
Having been refused admission to the Amicable Life Assurance Society, because they took no one over 45, he decided to form a new society on a plan of assurance that would be more "equitable". Dodson built on the statistical mortality tables developed by Edmund Halley in 1693. Equitable Life, as it was to be, charged premiums aimed at correctly offsetting the risks of long term life assurance policies. But Dodson made only unsuccessful attempts to procure a charter. The Equitable Life Assurance Society was founded in 1762 to put the actuarial principles that Dodson had developed over the previous decade into practice, by a group of mathematicians and others including Edward Rowe Mores.

== Works ==
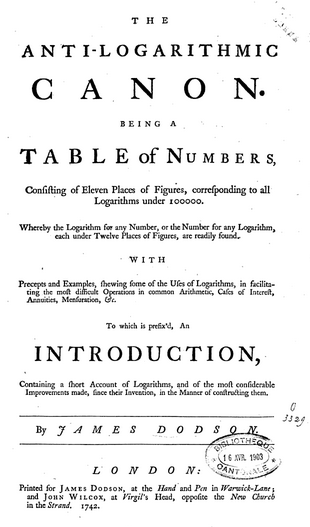

As a mathematician Dodson is known mainly for his work on The Anti-Logarithmic Canon and The Mathematical Miscellany.

In 1742 Dodson published The Anti-Logarithmic Canon. Being a table of numbers consisting of eleven places of figures, corresponding to all Logarithms under 100,000, with an Introduction containing a short account of Logarithms. This was a unique tabulation until 1849. The canon had been actually calculated, it is said, by Walter Warner and John Pell, in the period 1630 to 1640. Its provenance was that Warner had left it to Herbert Thorndike, at whose death it came to Richard Busby, and finally was bought for the Royal Society; but for some years it had been lost. In a letter of Pell's, 7 August 1644, written to Sir Charles Cavendish, it is said that Warner became bankrupt, and Pell surmises that the manuscript would be destroyed by the creditors in ignorance.

In 1747 Dodson published The Calculator … adapted to Science, Business, and Pleasure. It is a large collection of small tables, with some seven-figure logarithms. This he dedicated to William Jones. The same year he started the publication of The Mathematical Miscellany, containing analytical and algebraic solutions of a large number of problems in various branches of mathematics. His preface to vol. i is dated 14 January 1747, the title giving 1748. This volume is dedicated to Abraham de Moivre, and a second edition was issued by his publisher in 1775. Vol. ii (1753) is dedicated to David Papillon, and contains a contribution by de Moivre. Vol. iii (1755) he dedicated to Macclesfield and the Royal Society. This volume is devoted to problems relating to annuities, reversions, insurances, leases on lives, etc.. His Accountant, or a Method of Book-keeping, was published 1750, with a dedication to Macclesfield. In 1751 he edited Edmund Wingate's Arithmetic, which had previously been edited by John Kersey and then by George Shelley.

Another work, An Account of the Methods used to describe Lines on Dr. Halley's Chart of the terraqueous Globe, showing the variation of the magnetic needle about the year 1756 in all the known seas, &c. By Wm. Mountaine and James Dodson, about isogons, was published in 1758, after Dodson's death.

== Family ==
His three children were left unprovided for. At a meeting of the general court holden in Christ's Hospital 15 December 1757 a petition was read from William Mountaine, where it was stated that Dodson died 'in very mean circumstances, leaving three motherless children unprovided for, viz. James, aged 15, Thomas, aged 11 and three-quarters, and Elizabeth, aged 8.' The two youngest were admitted into the hospital. After the Equitable Society had started, and fifteen years or more after Dodson's death, a resolution was put in the minutes for giving £300 to the children of Dodson, as a recompense for the 'Tables of Lives' which their father had prepared for the society. Dodson's eldest son, James the younger (maternal grandfather of Augustus De Morgan), succeeded to the actuaryship of the society in 1764, but in 1767 left for the custom house.

== Bibliography ==
- Chatfield, Michael. "Dodson, James." In History of Accounting: An International Encyclopedia, edited by Michael Chatfield and Richard Vangermeersch. New York: Garland Publishing, 1996. pp. 211–212.
- James Dodson, The Mathematical Repository, Vol. III (1755)
- James Dodson, First Lectures on Insurance (1756)
- G. J. Gray, 'Dodson, James (c.1705–1757)', rev. Anita McConnell, Oxford Dictionary of National Biography, Oxford University Press, 2004. The first edition of this text is available at Wikisource: "Dodson, James" . Dictionary of National Biography. London: Smith, Elder & Co. 1885–1900.
