= Duchess of Montagu =

Duchess of Montagu is a title that was held by:

- Elizabeth Monck, Duchess of Albemarle (1654–1734)
- Mary Montagu, Duchess of Montagu (1689–1751)
- Mary Montagu, Duchess of Montagu (1711–1775)
