= Welbeck Academy =

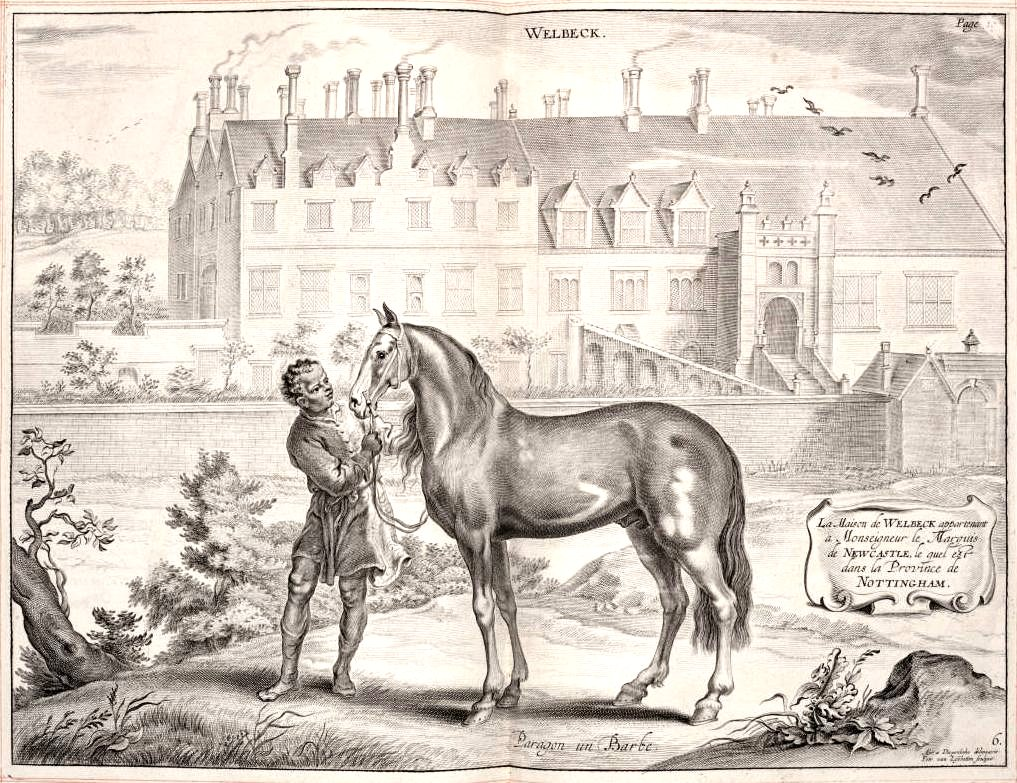
Welbeck Abbey as a background, from A General System of Horsemanship by Newcastle, engraving after Abraham van Diepenbeeck.

The Welbeck Academy or Welbeck Circle is a name that has been given to the loose intellectual grouping around William Cavendish, 1st Duke of Newcastle-upon-Tyne in the first half of the 17th century. It takes its name from Welbeck Abbey, a country house in Nottinghamshire that was a Cavendish family seat. Another term used is Newcastle Circle. The geographical connection is, however, more notional than real; and these terms have been regarded also as somewhat misleading. Cavendish was Viscount Mansfield in 1620, and moved up the noble ranks to Duke, step by step; "Newcastle" applies by 1628.

Newcastle was a royalist exile in continental Europe in the latter part of the First English Civil War and the Interregnum. He then returned to England and lived to 1676. His life shows many instances of cultural and intellectual patronage.

== Science and mathematics ==
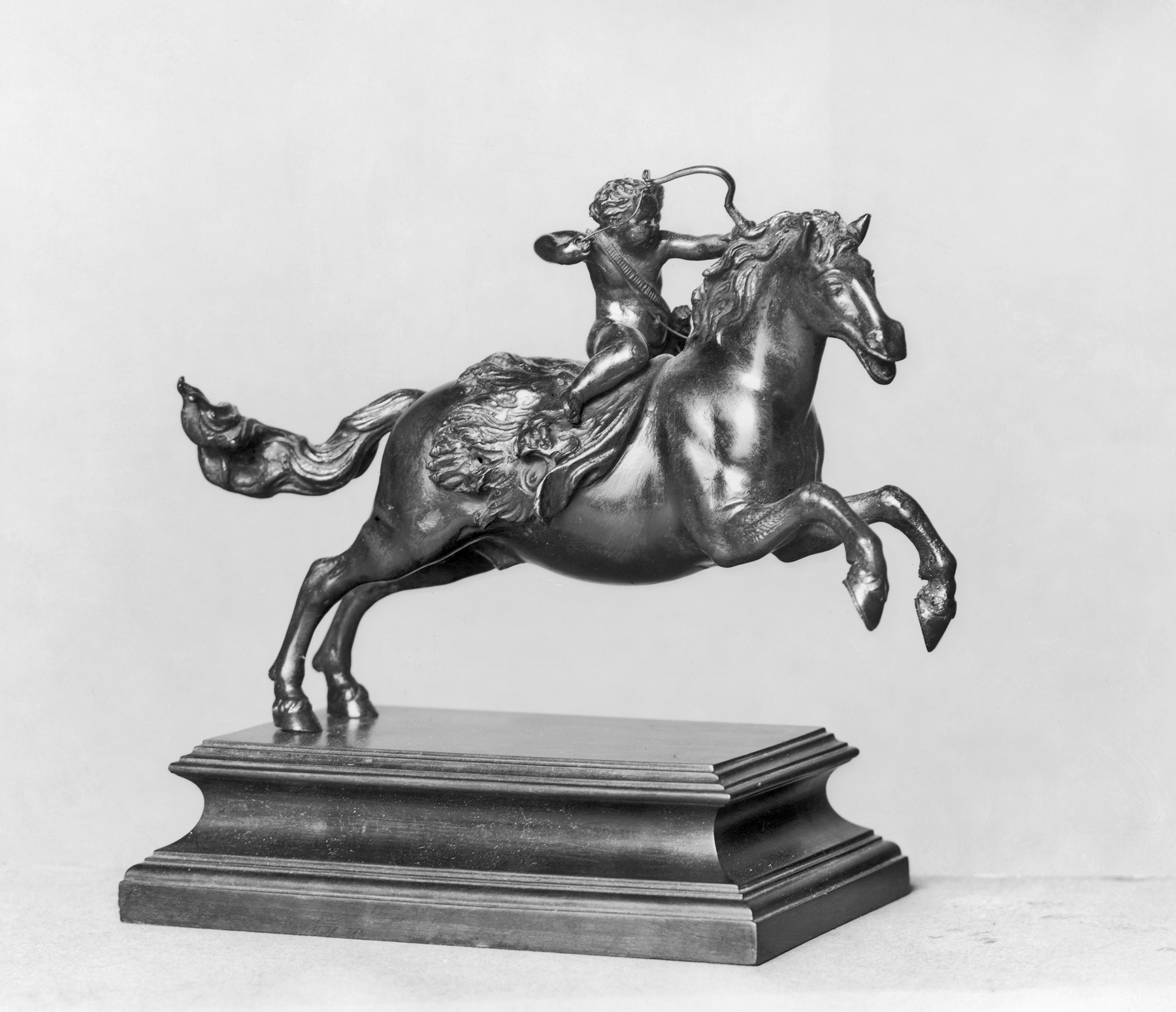
One of Francesco Fanelli's popular equestrian small bronzes

A scientific interest was optics. The group involved in these studies included Charles Cavendish (William's brother), Thomas Hobbes, Robert Payne and Walter Warner. This core "academy" group was disrupted when Newcastle took on responsibility for the Prince of Wales, in 1638. At a later point John Pell was in Newcastle's service.

Charles Cavendish's circle included Henry Bond, Richard Reeve or Reeves the instrument-maker, John Twysden and John Wallis. He was a patron of William Oughtred.

== Literature and the arts ==
Newcastle in the 1630s became a major patron to Ben Jonson. His second wife was Margaret Cavendish, née Lucas, the writer. Newcastle was called "our English Maecenas" by Gerard Langbaine the Younger; he was a patron after the Restoration to both John Dryden and Thomas Shadwell. Other writers he supported included William Davenant, William Sampson, James Shirley and John Suckling. He bought sculptures by Francesco Fanelli for Welbeck.

== In exile ==
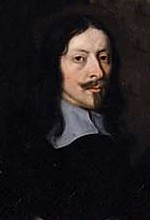
William Cavendish.

As a consequence of the royalist defeat at the Battle of Marston Moor in 1644, Newcastle and some of his entourage went into exile. He returned to England only with the Restoration of 1660. Initially he went to Hamburg. By 1645 Newcastle was in Paris: his circle had contacts in Marin Mersenne and Claude Mydorge, whom Charles Cavendish had met in France at least 15 years earlier. In France Newcastle met and married that year Margaret Lucas who was with the exiled court of Queen Henrietta Maria. She studied with Charles Cavendish, and became a writer on natural philosophy, initially a proponent of atomism. Besides Hobbes, who joined them in Paris, the Cavendishes knew at this period René Descartes, Kenelm Digby, and Christiaan Huygens. Much of the latter part of their exile was spent at Antwerp; there, though in debt, they lived in the Rubenshuis. Other associations were with Walter Charleton who came to know Margaret Cavendish (not necessarily abroad, since she returned to England for a time), and William Brereton, 3rd Baron Brereton.

== Relationship with Hobbes ==
Hobbes was employed by another branch of the Cavendish family (the Devonshire Cavendishes, who owned Chatsworth House). His association with Welbeck started at a date that is not completely clear. It was certainly by 1631, when he was tutor to a different Earl of the same name, William Cavendish, 3rd Earl of Devonshire. But possibly Hobbes had met Mansfield (as he then was) by 1627, on a tour of the Peak District, according to surviving poems (his own and by Richard Andrews), as related by Noel Malcolm. Hobbes himself claimed he had been in discussion with the Cavendish brothers by 1630; by 1636 he was engaging in a scientific correspondence with Newcastle. A manuscript work from the Cavendish group of this period, the so-called Short Tract on First Principles, is considered by Malcolm to be by Payne though very much influenced by the issues Hobbes was addressing at the time, and his approach. But the work has also been attributed to Hobbes himself, by scholars from Ferdinand Tönnies (who christened it) onwards.
