= Edward Montagu, 2nd Baron Montagu of Boughton =

English nobleman and politician

Edward Montagu, 2nd Baron Montagu of Boughton (11 July 1616 – 10 January 1684) of Boughton House, Northamptonshire was an English peer and politician.

== Life ==
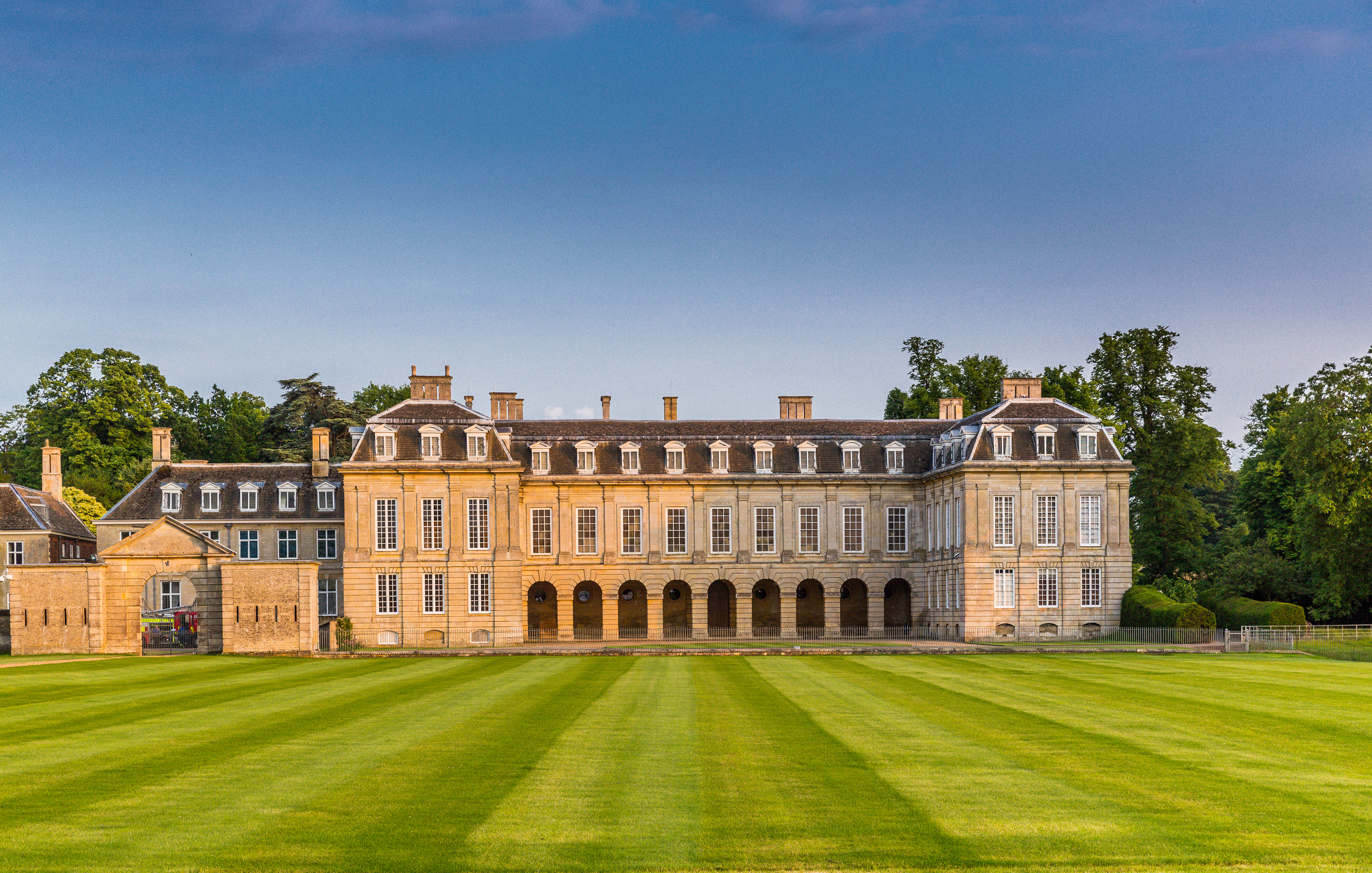
Boughton House, Northamptonshire

He was born at Weekley on 11 July 1616, the eldest son of Edward Montagu, 1st Baron Montagu of Boughton. He was educated at Oundle School and entered Sidney Sussex College, Cambridge, on 2 March 1631. He represented the borough of Huntingdon in the Long Parliament (elected 23 October 1640) until called to the House of Lords on the death of his father in 1644.

He took the engagement to the Commonwealth in October 1644, and was constantly in the House of Lords during the proceedings against Archbishop William Laud. On 18 July 1645 he was nominated by both houses of parliament one of the commissioners to reside with the Scottish army in England, and in that capacity treated for the surrender of Newark in May 1646. With Philip Herbert, 4th Earl of Pembroke and Basil Feilding, 2nd Earl of Denbigh he received the king's person from the Scots, and conducted him to Holmby. His report, read in the House of Lords on 10 June 1647, appeared in pamphlet form in London, 1647. He afterwards attended Charles till his escape in 1647. He took no part in the trial of the king, was summoned to sit as one of Oliver Cromwell's lords in December 1657, and welcomed the return of Charles II.

After the Restoration he resided chiefly at Boughton House, died on 10 January 1684 aged 67, and was buried at Weekley.

== Family ==
He married Anne, daughter, and eventually heir, of Sir Ralph Winwood of Ditton Park, Buckinghamshire, by whom he had two sons and one daughter; Edward, who predeceased him, Ralph, who succeeded him, and Elizabeth, who married Sir Daniel Harvey, ambassador at Constantinople.

== Notes ==
Attribution

This article incorporates text from a publication now in the public domain: Porter, Bertha (1894). "Montagu, Edward (1562-1644)". In Lee, Sidney (ed.). Dictionary of National Biography. Vol. 38. London: Smith, Elder & Co.

Peerage of England
Preceded by Edward Montagu	Baron Montagu of Boughton; 1644–1684	Succeeded by Ralph Montagu
