= Henry Cavendish, 2nd Duke of Newcastle =

English politician

His Grace The Duke of Newcastle upon Tyne KG PC MP
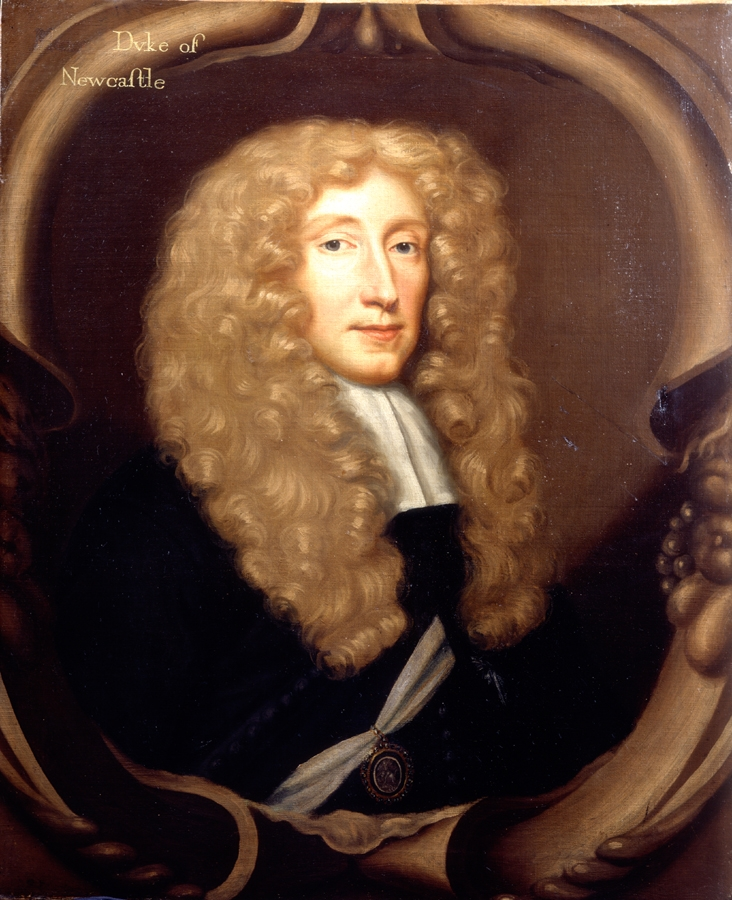
- Portrait attributed to Mary Beale

2nd Duke of Newcastle upon Tyne
- Tenure: 1676–1691
- Predecessor: William Cavendish, 1st Duke of Newcastle
- Born: 24 June 1630
- Died: 26 July 1691 (aged 61)
- Noble family: Cavendish
- Spouse: Frances Pierrepont (m. 1652)
- Issue: Elizabeth Monck, Duchess of Albemarle; Lady Frances Cavendish; Margaret Holles, Duchess of Newcastle-upon-Tyne; Henry Cavendish, Earl of Ogle; Lady Catherine Cavendish; Lady Arabella Cavendish
- Father: William Cavendish, 1st Duke of Newcastle
- Mother: Elizabeth Basset

Henry Cavendish, 2nd Duke of Newcastle upon Tyne, KG PC MP (24 June 1630 – 26 July 1691), styled Lord Henry Cavendish until 1659 and Viscount Mansfield from 1659 to 1676, was an English politician. He sat in the House of Commons from 1660 until 1676, when he inherited the dukedom. He was an adherent of James II and lost his public offices following the Glorious Revolution of 1688. He is also an 8th great-grandfather to King Charles III.

== Early life ==
Cavendish was the only surviving son of William Cavendish, 1st Duke of Newcastle, and his first wife, Elizabeth Basset. His maternal grandparents were William Basset and Judith Austen, daughter of Thomas Austen. During the English Civil War, he fought alongside his father as a Royalist. He later accompanied his father into exile, but returned to England in 1647 to help recover his family estates. His elder brother, Charles Cavendish, Viscount Mansfield, died in 1659, from which time Cavendish became heir to his father's titles and used the courtesy title of Lord Mansfield.

== Entry into politics ==
After the Restoration of the Monarchy, he was appointed Master of the Robes (June 1660–62) and a Gentleman of the Bedchamber (1662–68). In April 1660, Lord Mansfield was elected Member of Parliament (MP) for Derbyshire in the Convention Parliament. He was elected MP for Northumberland in 1661 for the Cavalier Parliament. He was generally inactive, but was appointed to 22 committees. By 1664 he was listed as a court dependent and he seconded the motion of Sir John Goodricke, 1st Baronet to gift £120,000 to James, Duke of York for his naval services.

He was a friend and political ally of Sir Thomas Osborne and was recorded as a supporter of the court in parliamentary lists complied 1669 and 1671. He was appointed to the Privy Council of England. This period also saw Lord Mansfield appointed to numerous local offices, including as a justice of the peace for Nottinghamshire (1660–1689) and a deputy lieutenant for Nottinghamshire (1660–1670) and Derbyshire (1662–1670). Lord Mansfield also served as a commissioner for the assessment of taxation, a commander of the local miliita in Cumbria, Westmorland and Northumerland, and as Lord Lieutenant of Northumberland from 1670 until 1689. During the Third Anglo-Dutch War from 1672 to 1674, he commanded a regiment of foot. From 1675 to 1686, he served as Governor of Berwick-upon-Tweed.

== Duke of Newcastle ==
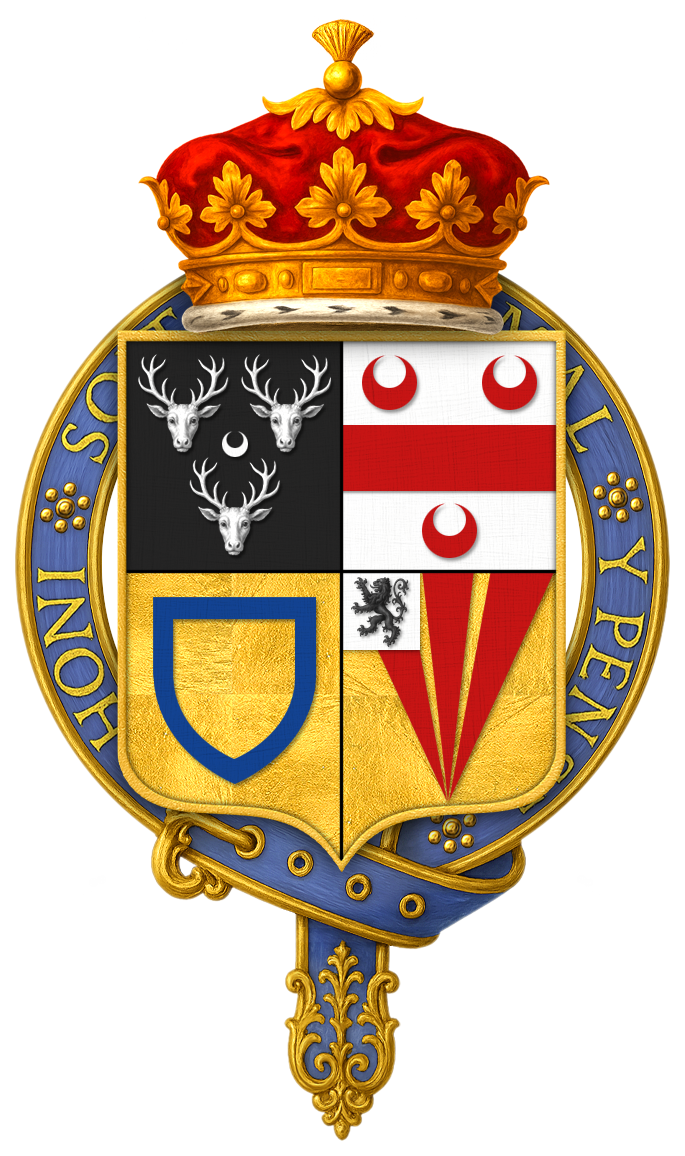
The arms of Henry Cavendish, 2nd Duke of Newcastle as a Knight of the Garter

In 1676, he inherited the title of Duke of Newcastle and the family seats of Welbeck Abbey, Bolsover Castle and Nottingham Castle on the death of his father. He was invested a Knight of the Garter in 1677. He remained a Tory in the House of Lords and in 1680 he voiced strong opposition to, voted against, the Exclusion Bill. After the accession of James II, Newcastle remained a loyal supporter of the king, despite his concern at James's policies favouring Roman Catholics.

During the Glorious Revolution of 1688, Newcastle attempted to maintain control over northern England for James II and refused to cooperate with Whig nobles who organised petitions against the king. After the revolution, he avoided taking the oaths to the new regime required under the Oaths of Allegiance and Supremacy Act 1688 on the grounds of ill health. As a result, he lost most of his public offices in 1689, including those of Justice in eyre, Lord Lieutenant of Nottinghamshire, Custos Rotulorum of Derbyshire and Lord Lieutenant of the North Riding of Yorkshire, although he took no known part in any subsequent Jacobite plots.

Newcastle died in 1691, leaving no surviving male heir, and thus the dukedom became extinct. Welbeck Abbey and other East Midlands estates passed to his favourite daughter Margaret, who had married John Holles, for whom the dukedom was recreated in 1694. The bequest was unsuccessfully contested by Cavendish's other daughters.

The department of Manuscripts and Special Collections, The University of Nottingham, holds a number of papers relating to the 2nd Duke of Newcastle – the Cavendish Papers (Pw 1), part of the Portland (Welbeck) Collection, includes some of his personal papers; and the Newcastle (Clumber) Collection (Ne) includes estate papers and family settlements from the time of the 2nd Duke.

== Marriage and issue ==
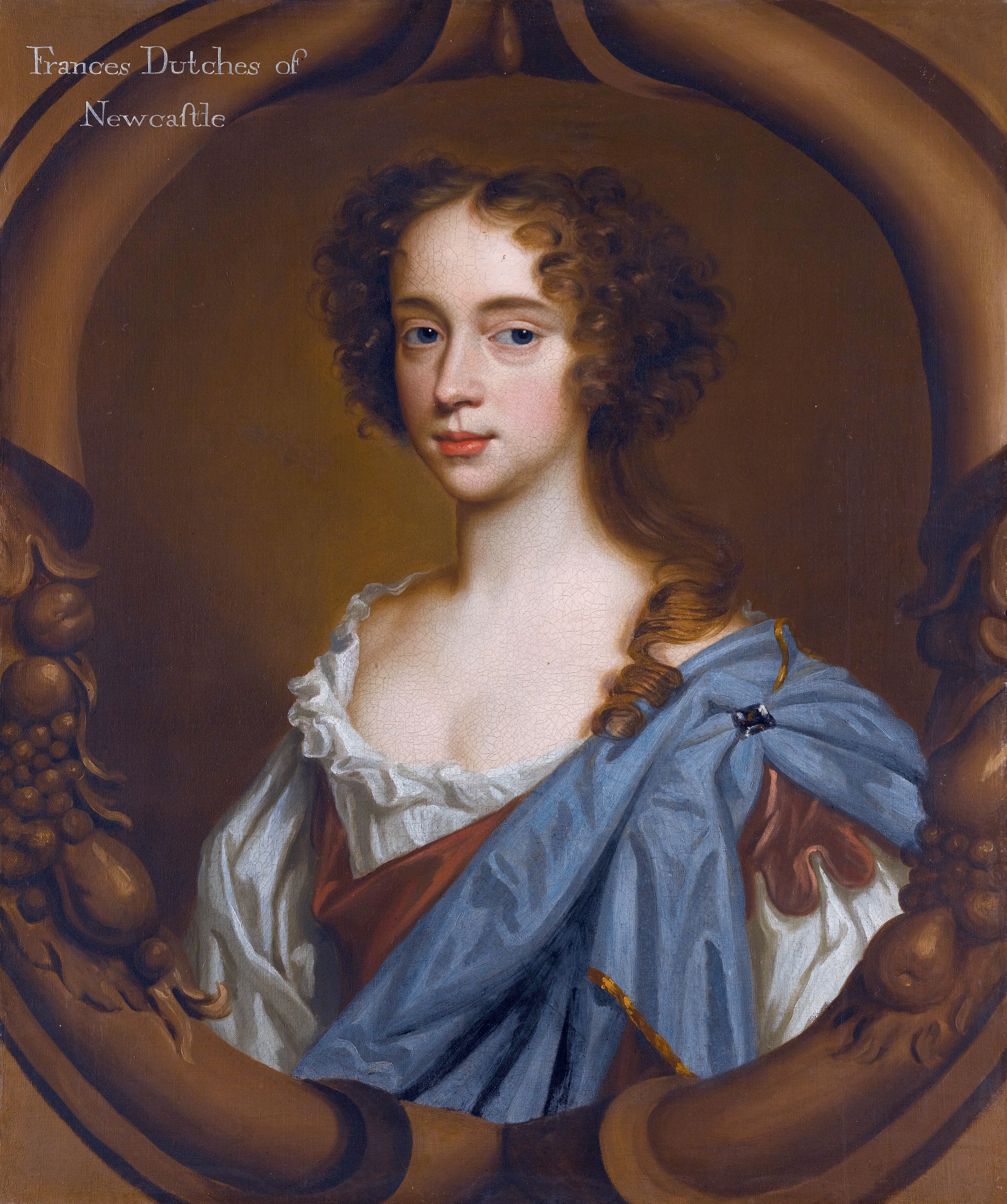
Frances Pierrepont, Duchess of Newcastle, by Mary Beale

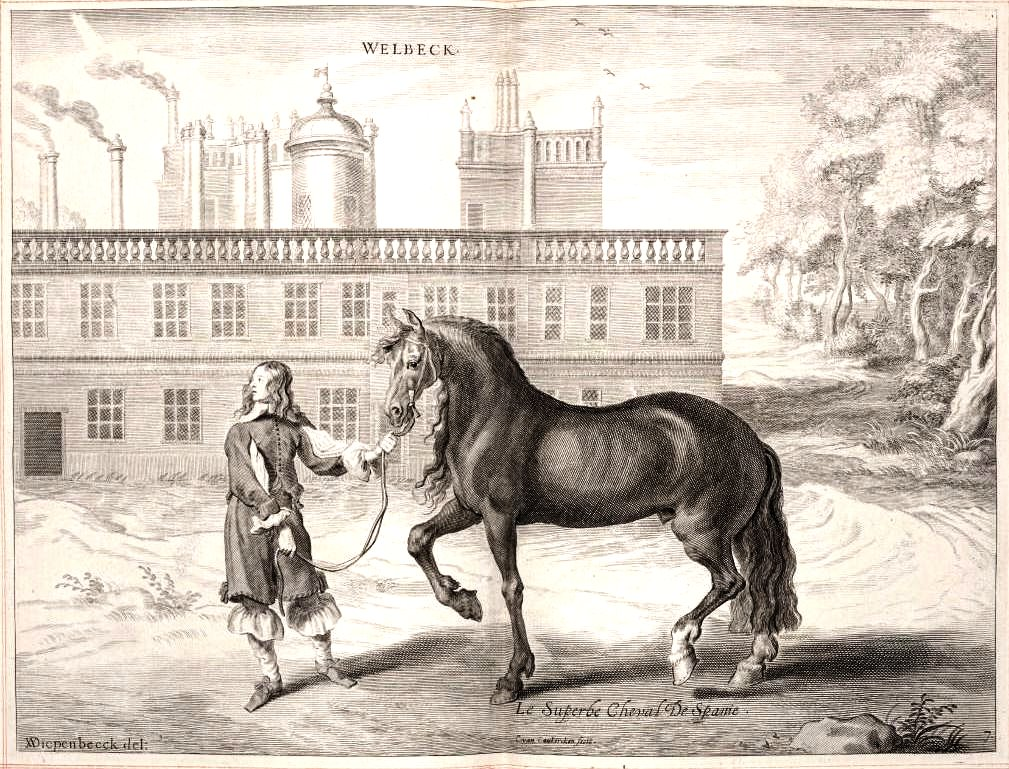
Welbeck Abbey, Nottinghamshire, in the 17th century

In 1652, Henry married Frances Pierrepont (b. 1 September 1630 in Thoresby, Nottinghamshire, d. 23 September 1695 in London), daughter of The Hon. William Pierrepont (who was the son of Robert Pierrepont, 1st Earl of Kingston-upon-Hull), and they had six children:

- Lady Elizabeth Cavendish (1654–1734), known as the 'Mad Duchess', who married firstly Christopher Monck, 2nd Duke of Albemarle; no issue. She married secondly Ralph Montagu, 1st Duke of Montagu; no issue.
- Lady Frances Cavendish (25 June 1660 – 4 February 1690), who married John Campbell, 2nd Earl of Breadalbane and Holland (19 November 1662 – 23 February 1752) before 1690; no issue.
- Lady Margaret Cavendish (22 October 1661 – 24 December 1716), who married John Holles, 1st Duke of Newcastle-upon-Tyne on 1 March 1690 and had issue. (This was the second creation of the dukedom in 1694 after the first became extinct in 1691).
- Henry Cavendish, Earl of Ogle (19 January 1663 – 1 November 1680), who married Lady Elizabeth Percy on 27 March 1679; no issue. In accordance with his marriage settlement, he adopted the surname of Percy in lieu of his patronymic. However he died the following year and was buried in the parish church at the Percy seat of Petworth.
- Lady Catherine Cavendish (14 January 1665 – 20 April 1712), who married Thomas Tufton, 6th Earl of Thanet on 14 August 1684 and had issue.
- Lady Arabella Cavendish (19 August 1673 – 4 June 1698), who married Charles Spencer, 3rd Earl of Sunderland on 12 January 1695 and had issue.

Through Henry, King Charles III and Queen Camilla are ninth cousins once removed.

== Coat of arms ==
Coat of arms of Henry Cavendish, 2nd Duke of Newcastle
Coronet A coronet of a Duke. Crest A serpent nowed proper. Escutcheon Sable three bucks' heads cabossed argent, with a crescent for different. Supporters Dexter, a bull or, ducally crowned gules; sinister, a lion ramp, guard, gules crined and ducally crowned or. Motto Cavendo tutus Safe through Caution

Parliament of England
Preceded by Not represented in the restored Rump	Member of Parliament for Derbyshire; 1660–1661; With: John Ferrers	Succeeded by Lord Cavendish; John Frescheville
Preceded by Sir William Fenwick, Bt; Ralph Delaval	Member of Parliament for Northumberland; 1661–1676; With: Sir William Fenwick, Bt	Succeeded by Sir Ralph Delaval, Bt; Sir John Fenwick, Bt
Court offices
Preceded by Protectorate	Master of the Robes; 1660–1662	Succeeded by Hon. Laurence Hyde
Military offices
Preceded by The Lord Widdrington	Governor of Berwick-upon-Tweed; 1675–1686	Succeeded by The Lord Widdrington
Honorary titles
Preceded by The Earl of Northumberland	Lord Lieutenant of Northumberland jointly with The Duke of Newcastle-upon-Tyne 1670–1676; 1670–1689	Succeeded by The Earl of Scarbrough
Preceded by The Lord Widdrington	Custos Rotulorum of Northumberland; 1675–1688	Succeeded by The Earl of Scarbrough
Preceded by The Duke of Newcastle-upon-Tyne	Custos Rotulorum of Derbyshire; 1677–1689	Succeeded by The Earl of Devonshire
Preceded by The Duke of Newcastle-upon-Tyne	Lord Lieutenant and Custos Rotulorum of Nottinghamshire; 1677–1689	Succeeded by The Earl of Kingston-upon-Hull
Preceded by The Earl of Mulgrave	Lord Lieutenant of the East Riding of Yorkshire; 1688–1689	Succeeded by The Earl of Kingston-upon-Hull
Preceded by The Viscount Fairfax of Emley	Lord Lieutenant of the North Riding of Yorkshire; 1688–1689	Succeeded by The Earl Fauconberg
Preceded by Lord Thomas Howard	Lord Lieutenant of the West Riding of Yorkshire; 1688–1689	Succeeded by The Marquess of Carmarthen
Legal offices
Preceded by The Duke of Newcastle-upon-Tyne	Justice in Eyre north of the Trent; 1677–1689	Succeeded by The Earl of Kingston-upon-Hull
Peerage of England
Preceded by William Cavendish	Duke of Newcastle-upon-Tyne; 1676–1691	Extinct
