= The Helmet (Oceanus Procellarum) =

Highland mass on the near side of the Moon

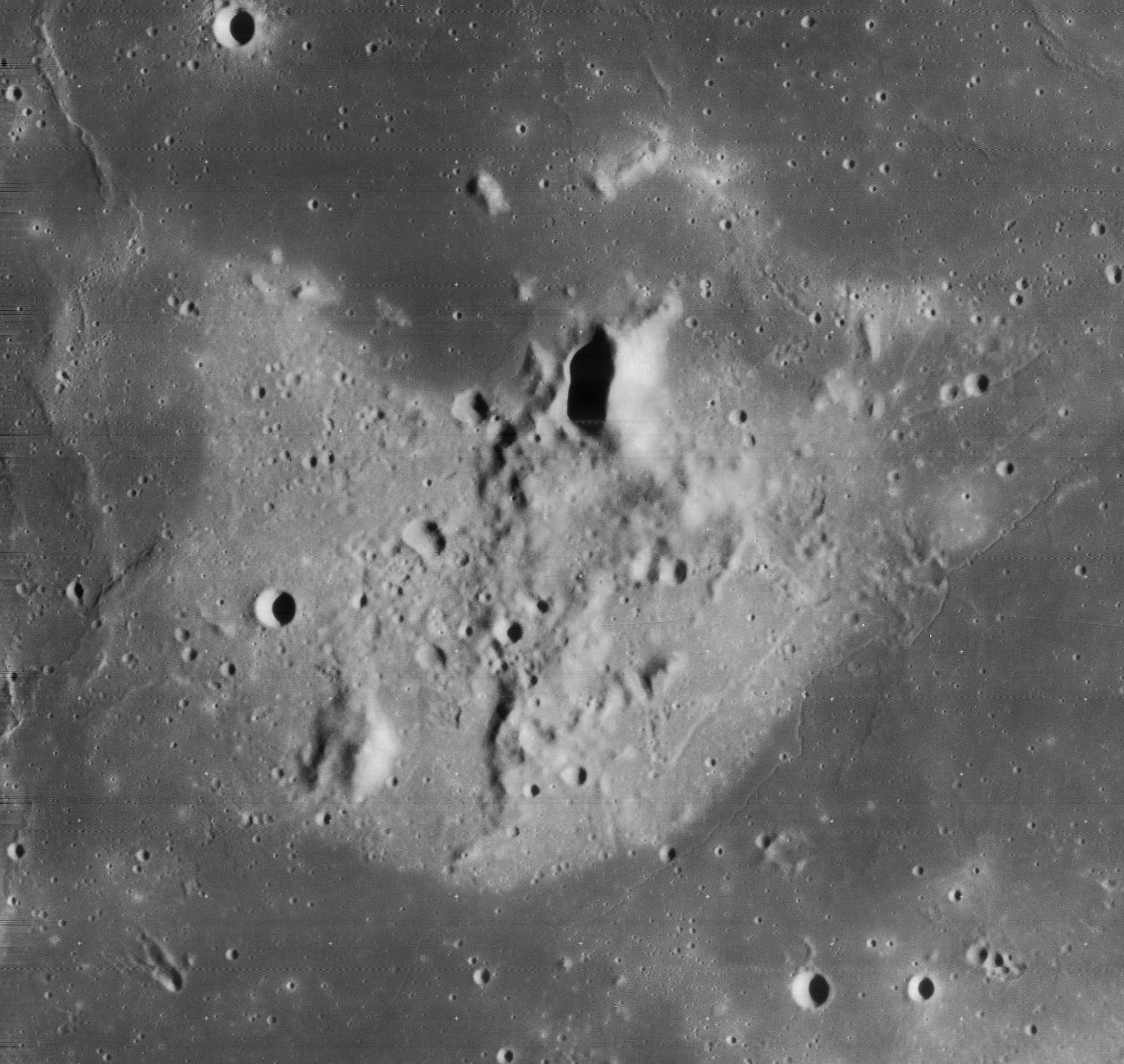
Lunar Orbiter 4 image of the helmet

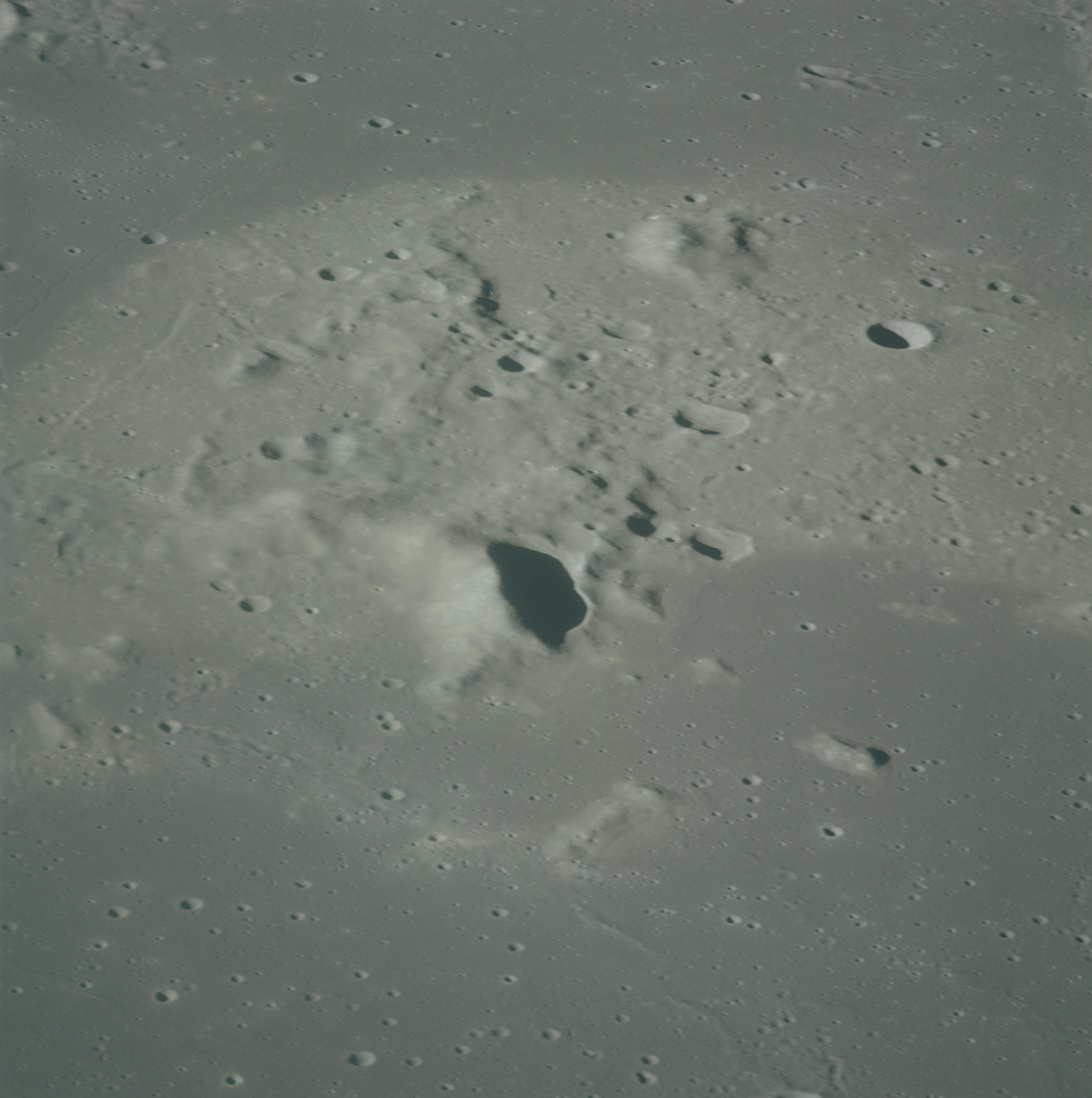
Apollo 16 image, facing south. This is Figure 28-10 of the Apollo 16 Preliminary Science Report, the caption of which is "Distinct color boundaries of highland mass in Oceanus Procellarum"

The Helmet is an informal term for a highland mass within southern Oceanus Procellarum on the near side of the Moon, southeast of the crater Herigonius. The astronauts of Apollo 16 used the term to refer to the feature during the mission. The name derives from the roughly semicircular shape of the border of the feature, resembling a helmet. The feature is topographically higher and of a higher albedo than the surrounding mare lava plain.

Two mountains within The Helmet are informally named Herigonius Eta (η) and Herigonius Pi (π). Eta is the larger mountain on the northern edge of the Helmet, and Pi is along the southwest edge.

The selenographic coordinates of this feature are 16.8° S, 31.6° W.

West of The Helmet and east of Gassendi, a group of hills and hillocks with satellite crater Herigonius F among them is called Andreus Hills on the greenish moonmap from Rand McNally. This name was never officially recognized by the International Astronomical Union (IAU). The name Andreus Hills is also seen on the same greenish moonmap in Atlas of the Universe (1983) from Patrick Moore.

The region called The Helmet by the astronauts of the Apollo program is the largest one of NASA's nicknamed formations. It is an easy target for telescopic observers of the full moon. It is also noticeable on the photographic version of chart LAC 93 (page 186) in The Clementine Atlas of the Moon.
