= Christopher Monck, 2nd Duke of Albemarle =

English Army officer, politician and colonial administrator

His Grace The Duke of Albemarle KG PC
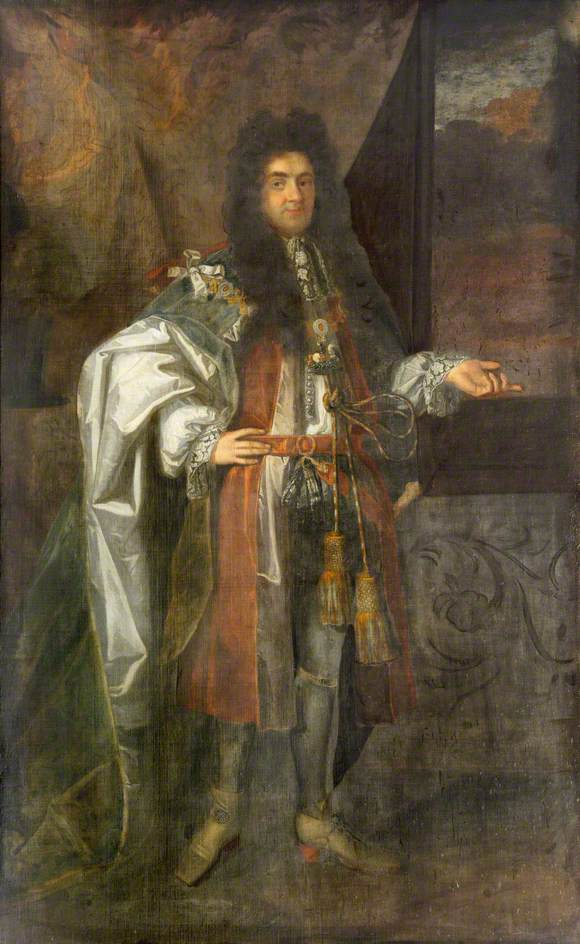
- Portrait of Albemarle

Member of Parliament for Devon
- In office 1667 – 3 January 1670
- Preceded by: Sir Hugh Pollard, Bt
- Succeeded by: Sir Coplestone Bampfylde, Bt

Member of the House of Lords Hereditary peer
- In office 3 January 1670 – 6 October 1688

Personal details
- Born: 14 August 1653
- Died: 6 October 1688 (aged 35) Jamaica
- Resting place: 4 July 1689; Westminster Abbey; 51°29′58″N 00°07′39″W
- Spouse: Lady Elizabeth Cavendish (m. 1669)
- Children: 1
- Parents: George Monck, 1st Duke of Albemarle (father); Anne Clarges (mother)
- Education: Gray's Inn
- Other titles: Earl of Torrington

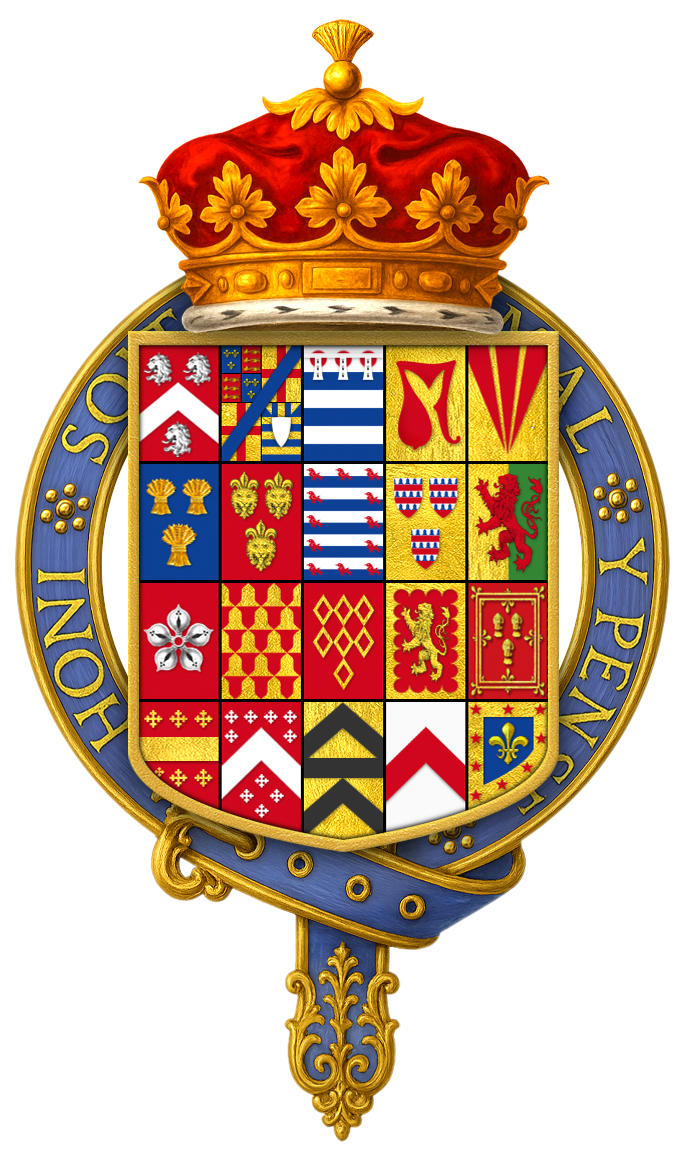
Quartered arms of Christopher Monck, 2nd Duke of Albemarle

Christopher Monck, 2nd Duke of Albemarle (14 August 1653 – 6 October 1688) was an English Army officer, politician and colonial administrator who sat in the House of Commons from 1667 to 1670 when he inherited his father's dukedom and sat in the House of Lords.

Monck briefly served as Lieutenant Governor of Jamaica and is credited with arranging the first boxing match in England.

== Life ==
=== Early life ===
Monck was the son and heir of George Monck, 1st Duke of Albemarle (1608–1670) by his wife Anne Clarges (d.1700), a daughter of John Clarges, "Farrier in the Savoy", of Drury Lane, Westminster. Anne's brother was Sir Thomas Clarges (c. 1618–1695), MP, who greatly assisted his brother-in-law, the then – before his elevation to the dukedom – General George Monck, in bringing about the Restoration of the Monarchy in 1660. She was the presumed widow of Thomas Radford, milliner, of New Exchange, Strand, Westminster, although it was said that her husband was still alive when her son was born. This left a question concerning Monck's legitimacy.

Monck was educated privately, and entered Gray's Inn in 1662. From 1660 until his father's death ten years later in 1670, he was known by the courtesy title of Earl of Torrington, one of his father's subsidiary titles.

=== Career ===
At the age of 13, Monck entered politics, having been elected Member of Parliament (MP) for Devon in January 1667. In 1670 he was elevated to the peerage following the death of his father, inheriting his father's peerage titles, and thus entered the House of Lords when he reached 21. He became a Gentleman of the Bedchamber and inherited his father's great feudal title, Lord of Bowland. He was created a Knight of the Garter, a Privy Councillor and in 1675 Lord Lieutenant of Devon, in which latter role he served for ten years. He became a titular colonel of several horse regiments of the English Army.

In 1673 he raised a regiment as part of the Blackheath Army under Marshal Schomberg. It was intended for service in the Dutch Republic, but was disbanded following the Treaty of Westminster before seeing any action.

On 6 January 1681, Monck arranged a boxing match between his butler and his butcher. This was the first recorded boxing match in England. The butcher won the match.

From 1682 until his death, Monck was Chancellor of the University of Cambridge. In 1685 he resigned the Lord Lieutenancy of Devon to fight against the Monmouth Rebellion, but was largely unsuccessful as a military leader. In 1686, Monck was a major investor in a treasure-seeking expedition headed by William Phips, who had located the wreck of the Spanish treasure ship Nuestra Señora de la Concepción in February 1687. Phips returned to London with more than £200,000 worth of treasure, of which Monck received a 25 percent share.

After serving in a few more minor positions, in 1687, Monck was appointed Lieutenant Governor of Jamaica.

=== Death and succession ===
Monck died in Jamaica on 6 October 1688, aged 35. He was buried in Westminster Abbey on 4 July 1689. As the Duke left no children, all his titles became extinct on his death.

== Legacy ==
Monck is credited with the first boxing match in England. English buccaneer Ambrose Cowley named the Duke of Albemarle's Island after him, the island in the Galapagos now known as Isabela.

== Residences ==
=== Potheridge, Devon ===
Arms of Monck of Potheridge, Devon: Gules, a chevron between three lion's heads erased argent

His Devonshire seat was Potheridge, three miles south-east of Great Torrington, a grand mansion rebuilt by his father circa 1660 on the site of the former manor house occupied by his family since, at the latest, 1287. It was mostly demolished after the death of the 2nd duchess in 1734; the surviving section forms the present Great Potheridge farmhouse – inside which, however, some remnants of the former mansion remain, including two massive 17th-century classical-style doorcases, a colossal overmantel with carved putti and trophies, and a grand staircase.

=== Clarendon House, London ===
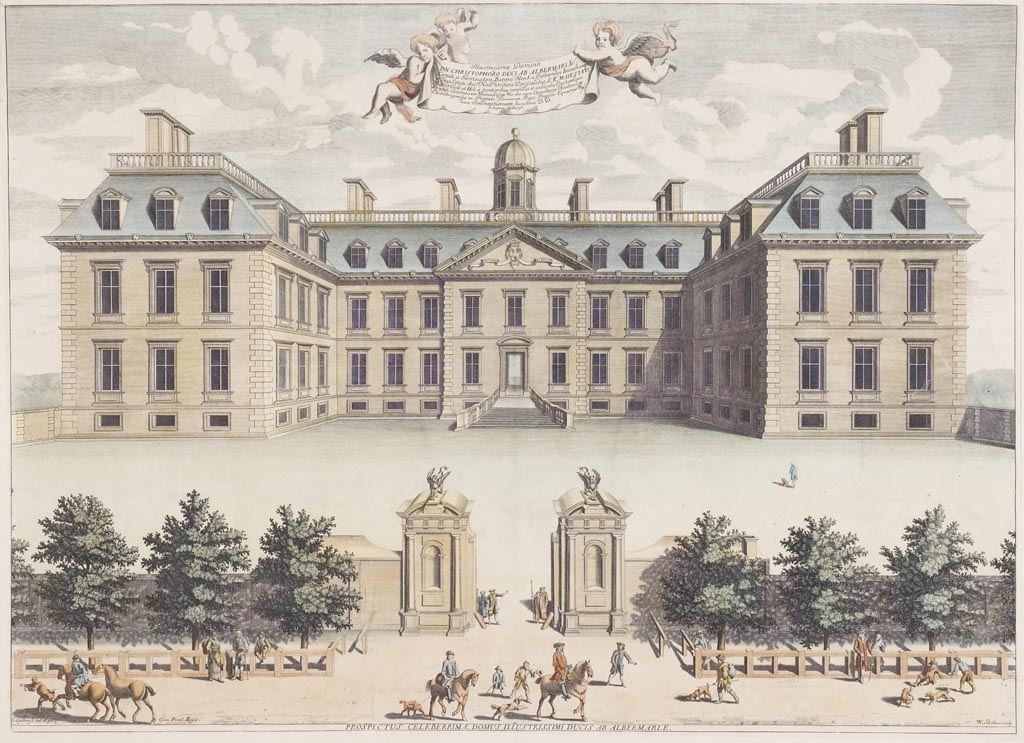
Clarendon House, circa 1680. Inscribed below: Prospectus Celeberrimae Domus Illustrissimi Ducis ab Albemarle ("Prospect of the most famous house of the illustrious Duke of Albemarle"). Engraving by William Skillman (fl.1660–1685) from painting by Johann Spilberg II (1619–1690)

In 1675 Monck purchased for £26,000 the very grand London townhouse Clarendon House from the heirs of its builder, Edward Hyde, 1st Earl of Clarendon (1609–1674). In 1683 he resold it to a consortium of investors led by Sir Thomas Bond, who demolished it and built on its site Albemarle Street, Bond Street and Dover Street.

== Family ==
At the royal Palace of Whitehall in London on 30 December 1669, shortly before his father's death, Monck married Lady Elizabeth Cavendish (d.1734), eldest daughter and co-heiress of Henry Cavendish, 2nd Duke of Newcastle. She gave birth to a son who died soon after his birth, and Monck left no further surviving children. In 1692 his widow remarried to Ralph Montagu, 1st Duke of Montagu (1638 – c. 1709). She was buried in Westminster Abbey on 11 September 1734.

Parliament of England
Preceded by Sir Hugh Pollard, Bt; Sir John Rolle	Member of Parliament for Devon; 1667–1670; With: Sir John Rolle	Succeeded by Sir John Rolle; Sir Coplestone Bampfylde
Military offices
New title	Colonel of the Queen's Regiment of Horse; 1678–1679	Regiment disbanded
Preceded by The Duke of Monmouth	Captain and Colonel of His Majesty's Own Troop of Horse Guards; 1679–1685	Succeeded by The Earl of Feversham
Honorary titles
Preceded by The Earl of Bath	Lord Lieutenant and Custos Rotulorum of Devon; 1675–1685	Succeeded by The Earl of Bath
Preceded by The Earl of Oxford	Lord Lieutenant of Essex jointly with The Earl of Oxford; 1675–1687	Succeeded by The Lord Petre
Government offices
Preceded by Hender Molesworth	Lieutenant Governor of Jamaica; 1687–1688	Succeeded by Hender Molesworth, acting
Peerage of England
Preceded by George Monck	Duke of Albemarle; 1670–1688	Extinct
