= Charles Cavendish (Nottingham MP) =

17th-century English soldier, courtier, and arts patron

Sir Charles Cavendish KG KB PC
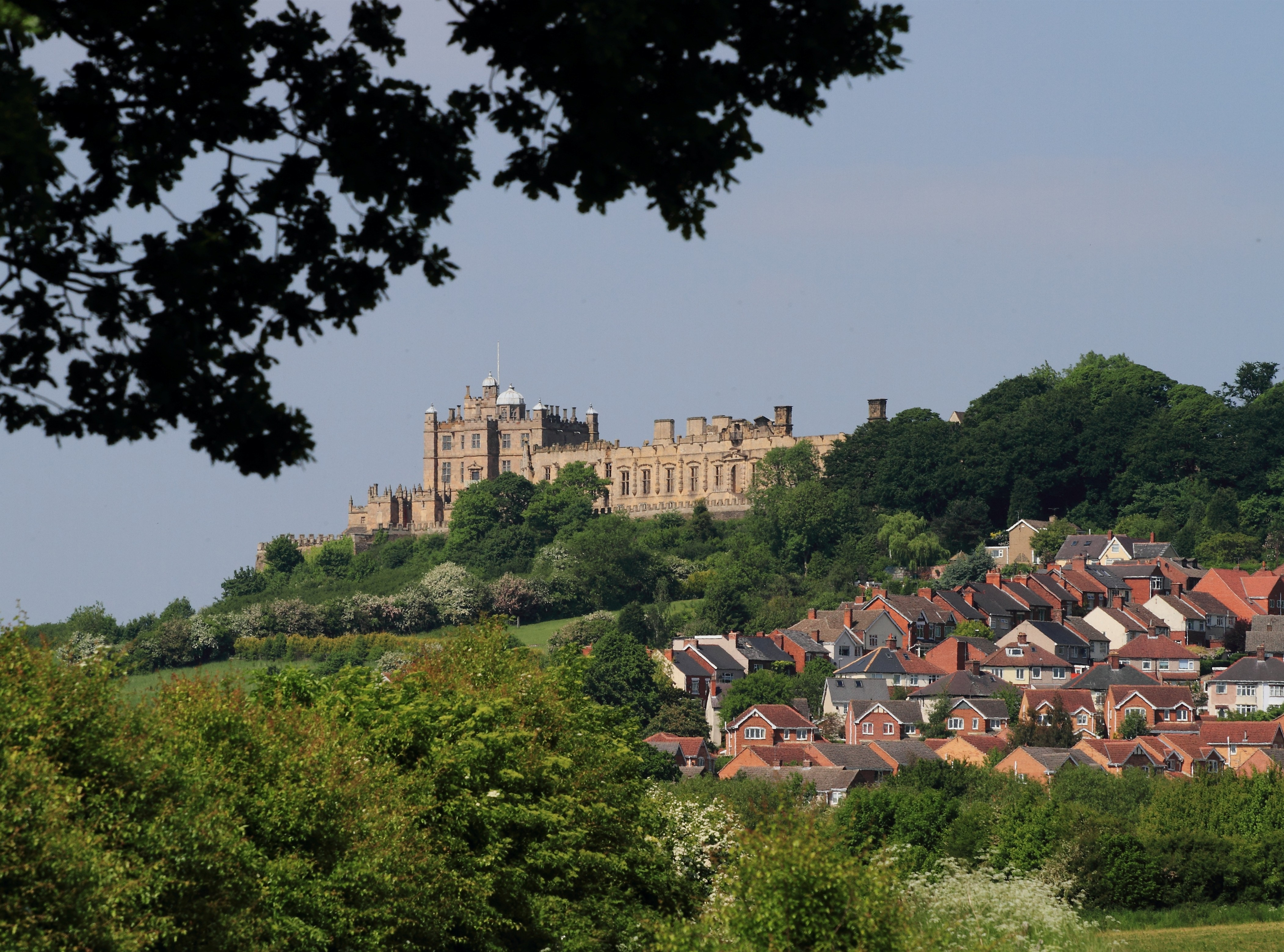
- Bolsover Castle

MP for Nottingham
- In office 1640–Suspended

MP for Nottingham
- In office 1628–1629

MP for Nottingham
- In office 1623–1625

Personal details
- Born: 1594 Handsworth, West Riding of Yorkshire, England
- Died: 4 February 1653 (aged 61) Welbeck, Nottinghamshire, England
- Resting place: Bolsover, Derbyshire
- Relations: William, Duke of Newcastle (1593–1676)
- Parent(s): Sir Charles and Lady Catherine Cavendish
- Occupation: Courtier, arts patron, and soldier

Military service
- Allegiance: England
- Branch/service: Cavalry
- Years of service: 1642 to 1644
- Rank: Lieutenant General
- Battles/wars: First English Civil War 1642–1646; Adwalton Moor Second Hull Marston Moor

Sir Charles Cavendish (1594 – 1654) was an English aristocrat, Member of Parliament for Nottingham, and patron.

Described as "a little, weak, crooked man" by John Aubrey, he studied mathematics himself, as well as supporting others, including Walter Warner, Robert Payne, and William Oughtred.

During the First English Civil War from 1642 to 1646, he became a Lieutenant General in the Royalist army in the north, under his brother, William, Earl of Newcastle. He accompanied him into exile after the defeat at Marston Moor in July 1644.

At the request of his brother, he returned to England in 1651, and managed to purchase Bolsover Castle and Welbeck Abbey, which had been confiscated by Parliament. He died at Bolsover in February 1654.

== Life ==
He was the younger brother of William Cavendish, 1st Duke of Newcastle-upon-Tyne. He built a mansion on the site of Bolsover Castle, bought by his father (also called Sir Charles Cavendish). His work on the house, to a design by John Smythson (son of Robert Smythson), was never completed.

He was knighted, at Welbeck on 10 August 1619, during a visit of the king to his brother. On 23 January 1623–4, he was returned to parliament for the borough of Nottingham. He was also returned for the same place to the third parliament of Charles I on 18 February 1627–8, and to the Short parliament on 30 March 1640.

On the outbreak of the civil war, Cavendish, with his brother Newcastle, entered the king's service, serving under his brother as lieutenant-general of the horse. He behaved with great gallantry in several actions, particularly distinguishing himself at the Battle of Marston Moor. He went into exile with his brother after the battle.

His group of intellectual acquaintances has been called the Welbeck Circle, after the family home Welbeck Abbey; it has also been called the "Newcastle Circle" after the elder brother's title. Because the Cavendishes were royalist émigrés of the 1640s, the centre of this circle moved to Paris, where it took on the form of a salon. It grew around Thomas Hobbes and John Pell, with Sir Kenelm Digby joining in Paris, and also included William Petty.

Cavendish knew Pell from the Welbeck period, along with the mathematicians Walter Warner and Robert Payne. He supported William Oughtred, and was a friend of John Wallis, Marin Mersenne and Claude Mydorge; he later met René Descartes, Gilles de Roberval and Pierre Gassendi.

As a royalist, Cavendish's estates were sequestered in 1649, preventing him settling land on his creditors as repayment, including Charles Moseley and the upholsterer Ralph Grynder.

Cavendish was disinclined to make any concession by returning to England, but as the revenue from his estates was serviceable to his family, his brother Newcastle induced Clarendon to persuade him to make his submission. He accordingly repaired to England in the beginning of November with Lady Newcastle. They stayed in Southwark and afterwards in lodgings at Covent Garden, in great poverty. He was finally admitted to compound, and succeeded in purchasing Welbeck and Bolsover which had been confiscated from his brother. The proceedings in regard to his estates were not completed at the time of his death.

He was buried at Bolsover in the family vault on 4 Feb. 1653–4.
