= Herigonius (crater) =

Small circular depression on the Moon

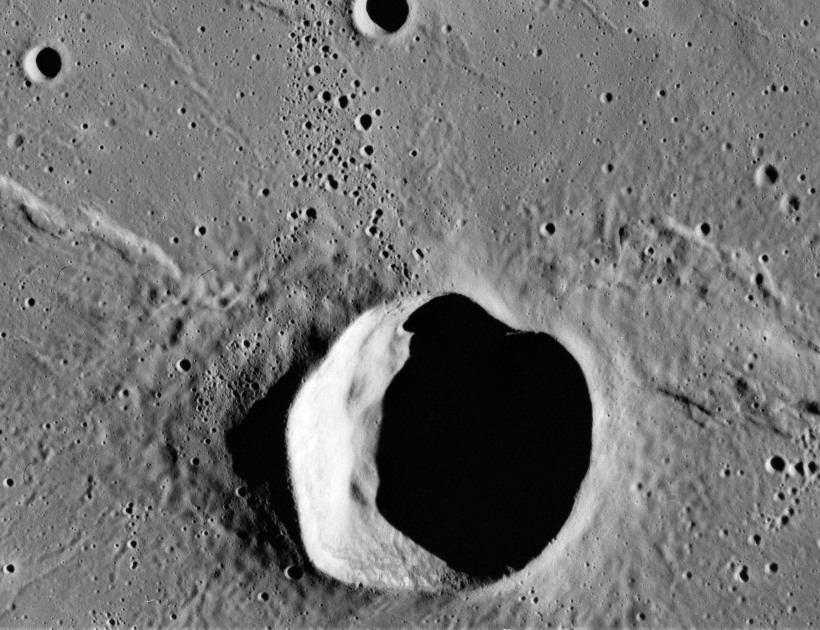
- Apollo 16 Mapping camera image
- Coordinates: 13.3°S 34.0°W
- Diameter: 15 km
- Depth: 2.1 km
- Colongitude: 34° at sunrise
- Eponym: Pierre Hérigone

Herigonius is a small lunar impact crater that is located in the southern part of the Oceanus Procellarum, to the northeast of the crater Gassendi. It was named after French mathematician and astronomer Pierre Hérigone. Herigonius is roughly circular, with an inward bulge and narrower inner wall along the northeast. In the interior of the sloping inner walls is a floor about half the diameter of the crater.

About 60 kilometers to the west of Herigonius is a sinuous rille designated Rimae Herigonius. This cleft is about 100 kilometers in length and runs generally in a north–south direction, while curving to the east at the north end.

Two mountains within a highland mass informally called "The Helmet" (by the Apollo 16 crew) are informally named Herigonius Eta (η) and Herigonius Pi (π). Eta is the larger mountain on the northern edge of the Helmet, and Pi is along the southwest edge. North and northwest of the crater is the wrinkle ridge Dorsa Ewing, which also contacts Rimae Herigonius.

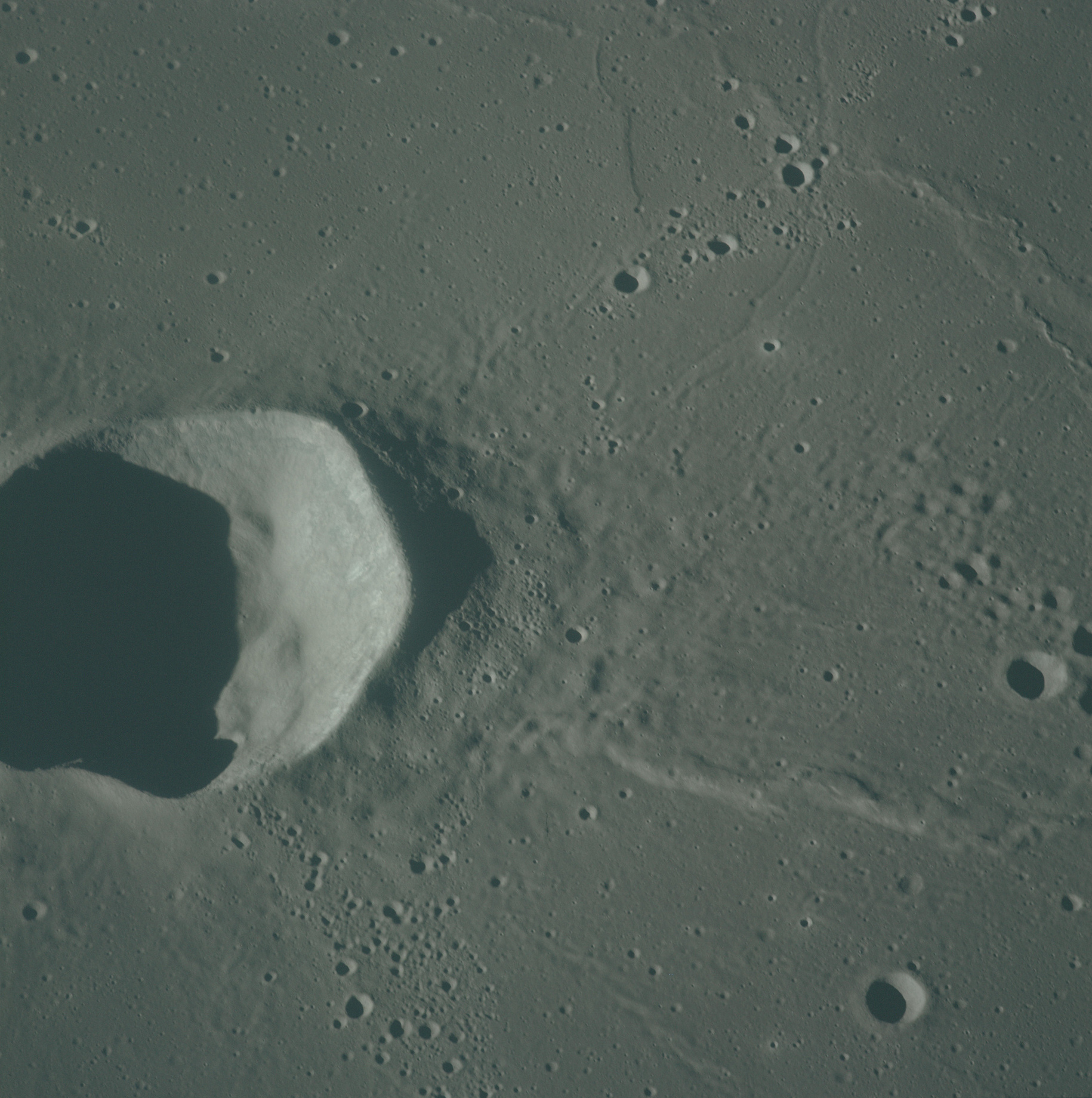
Oblique image also from Apollo 16

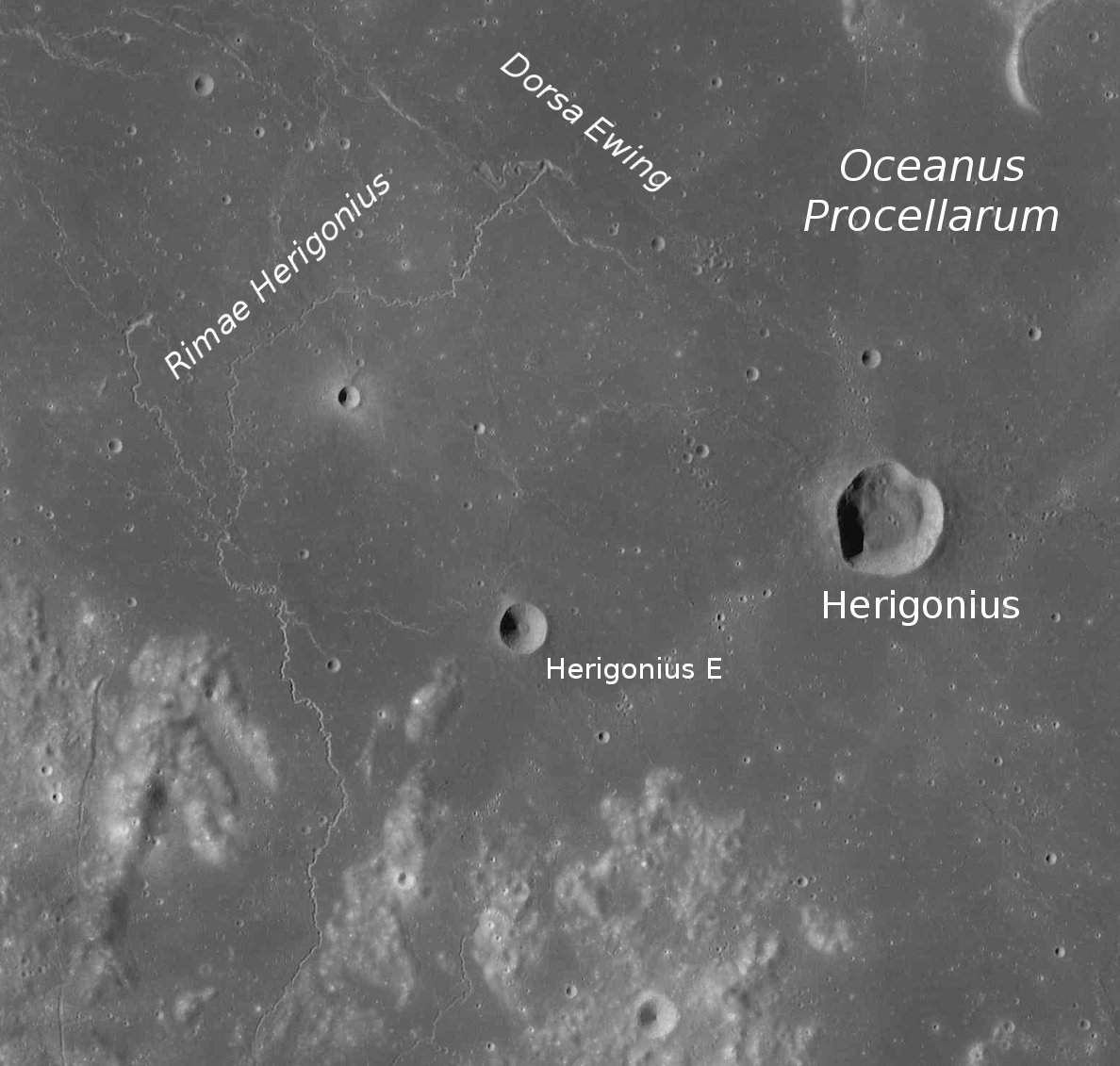
Regional map

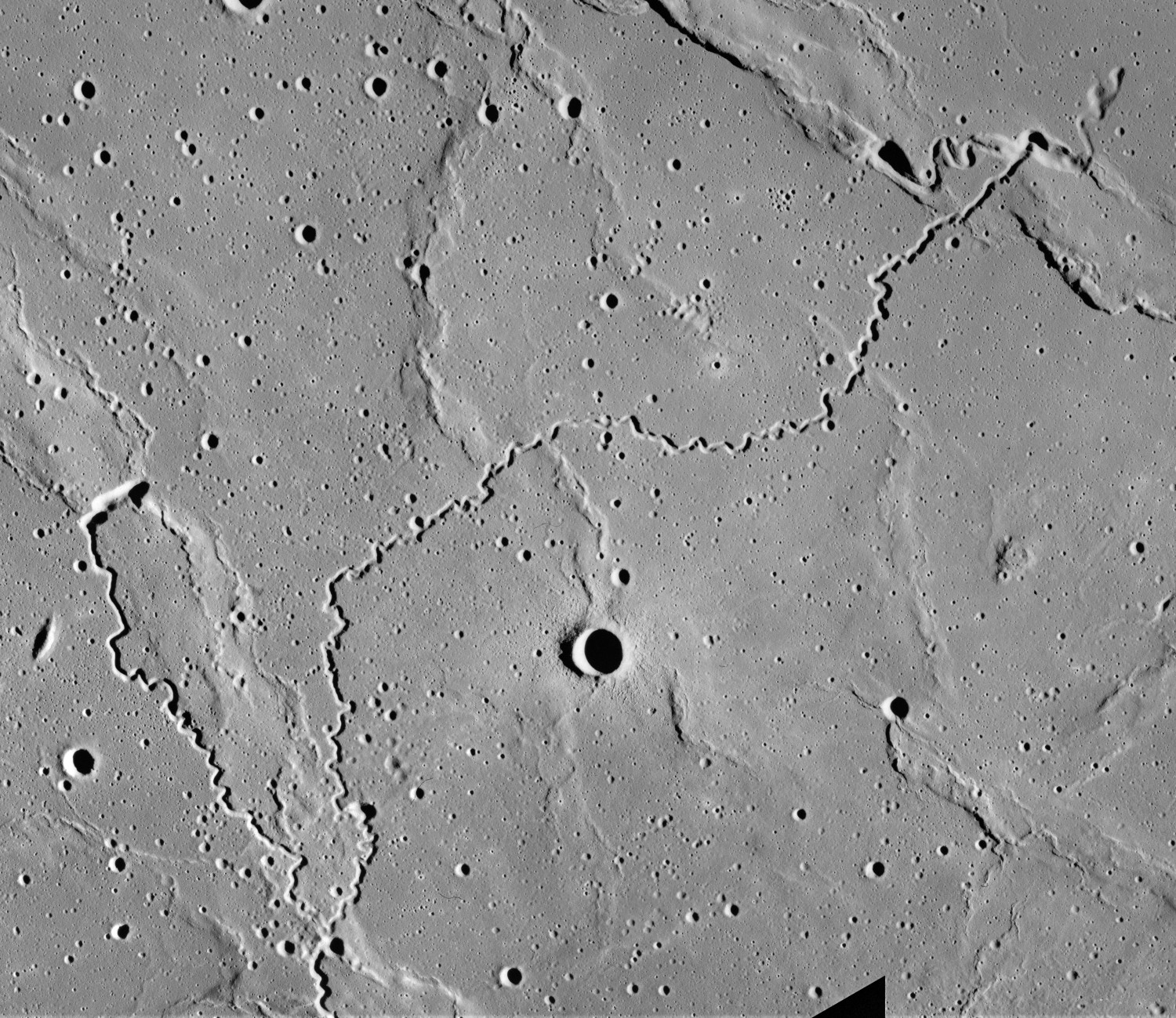
Most of the Rimae Herigonius and Herigonius K crater (below center). The rimae (rilles) extend to the south out of the picture.

== Satellite craters ==
By convention these features are identified on lunar maps by placing the letter on the side of the crater midpoint that is closest to Herigonius.

Herigonius	Latitude	Longitude	Diameter
E	13.8° S	35.6° W	7 km
F	15.5° S	35.0° W	5 km
G	15.3° S	32.4° W	3 km
H	17.0° S	33.2° W	4 km
K	12.8° S	36.4° W	3 km
