= Jean-Baptiste Morin (mathematician) =

French astronomer and astrologer (1583–1656)

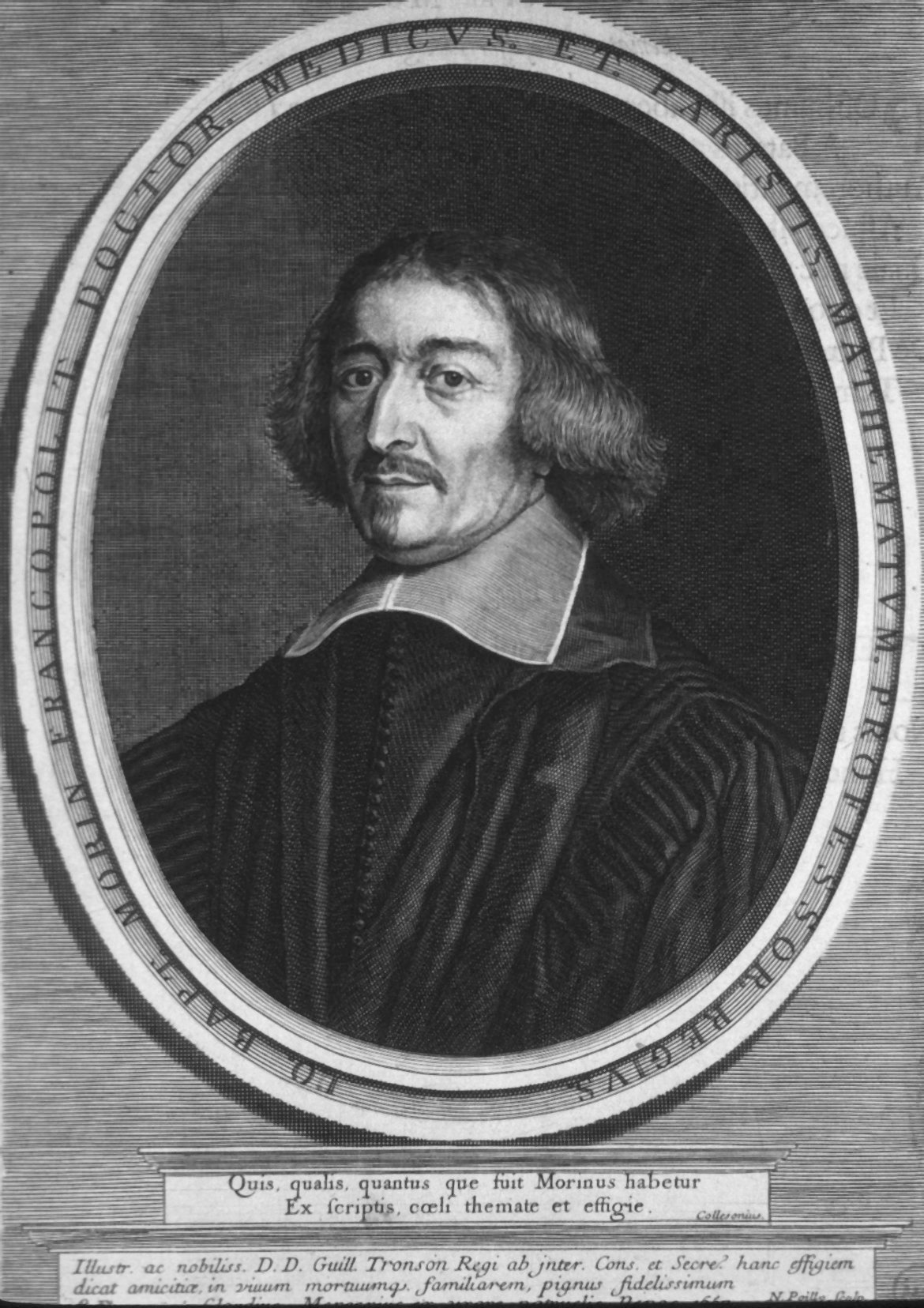
Jean-Baptiste Morin

Jean-Baptiste Morin (February 23, 1583 – November 6, 1656), also known by the Latinized name as Morinus, was a French mathematician, astrologer, and astronomer.

== Life and work ==
Born in Villefranche-sur-Saône, in the Lyonnais, he began studying philosophy at Aix-en-Provence at the age of 16. He studied medicine at Avignon in 1611 and received his medical degree two years later. He was employed by the Bishop of Boulogne from 1613 to 1621 and was sent to Germany and Hungary during this time. He served the bishop as an astrologer and also visited mines and studied metals. He subsequently worked for the Duke of Luxembourg until 1629. Morin published a defense of Aristotle in 1624. He also worked in the field of optics, and continued to study in astrology. He worked with Pierre Gassendi on observational astronomy.

In 1630, Morin was appointed professor of mathematics at the Collège Royal, a post he held until his death.

A firm believer of the idea that the Earth remained fixed in space, Morin is best known for being an opponent of Galileo and the latter's ideas. He continued his attacks after the Trial of Galileo. Morin seems to have been a rather contentious figure, as he also attacked Descartes' ideas after meeting the philosopher in 1638. These disputes isolated Morin from the scientific community at large.

Morin believed that improved methods of solving spherical triangles had to be found and that better lunar tables were needed.

== Morin and longitude ==
Morin attempted to solve the longitude problem. In 1634, he proposed his solution, based on measuring absolute time by the position of the Moon relative to the stars. His method was a variation of the lunar distance method first put forward by Johann Werner in 1514. Morin added some improvements to this method, such as better scientific instruments and taking lunar parallax into account. Morin did not believe that Gemma Frisius' transporting clock method for calculating out longitude would work. Morin, unfailingly irascible, remarked, "I do not know if the Devil will succeed in making a longitude timekeeper but it is folly for man to try."

A prize was to be awarded, so a committee was set up by Richelieu to evaluate Morin's proposal. Serving on this committee were Étienne Pascal, Claude Mydorge, and Pierre Hérigone. The committee remained in dispute with Morin for the five years after he made his proposal. Morin refused to listen to objections to his proposal, which was considered impractical. In his attempts to convince the committee members, Morin proposed that an observatory be set up in order to provide accurate lunar data. He wrangled with the committee for five years.

In 1645, Cardinal Mazarin, Richelieu's successor, awarded Morin a pension of 2,000 livres for his work on the longitude problem.

== Morin and astrology ==
Perhaps most famous for his work as an astrologer, towards the end of his life Morin completed Astrologia Gallica ("French Astrology"), a treatise which he did not live to see in print. The 26 books of intricate, complex, Latin text were published at the Hague in 1661 as one thick folio 850 pages long. The work covers natal, judicial, mundane, electional and meteorological astrology, and parts that are most concerned with astrological techniques (as compared to theological discussion on which they are based) have been translated or paraphrased into French, Spanish, German, and English.

At least among English-speaking astrologers, Morin is known as having been particularly concerned with prediction through methodical extrapolation of what is promised in the natal chart. His techniques were directions, solar and lunar return, and he regarded transits a subsidiary technique though one key to accurate timing of events nonetheless.

Morin challenged much of classical astrological theory, including the astrology of Ptolemy, in an attempt to present a solid set of tools while rendering reasons for and against particular techniques, some of which may be considered crucial to many astrologers before and during Morin’s lifetime. At the same time, Morin vested himself heavily in promoting in mundo directions, a technique largely based on the work of Regiomontanus that became available thanks to then-recent advancement in mathematics. In his work, Morin provides examples of successful delineation of events that otherwise could not be delineated with the same relative degree of certainty.

Morin’s life was one of trial and tribulation by his own testament. He died in Paris of natural causes at 73 years of age.

== Bibliography ==
- Morin (Jean-Baptiste), astronome, né à Villefranehe le 7 mars 1583, mort à Paris le 6 novembre 1656. La Vie de maistre JeanBaptiste Morin, natif de Villefranche en Beaujolois, docteur en médecine et professeur royal aux mathématiques à Paris (in French). Hénault. 1660.
- Jean Hiéroz, L'astrologie selon Morin de Villefranche, quelques autres et moi-même, 2e édition remaniée et augmentée, Éditions Omnium Littéraire, 1962.
- Robert Corre | Astrologia Gallica | A HISTORY OF MAGIC AND EXPERIMENTAL SCIENCE.
- Ruellet, Aurélien (2014). Deux documents inédits sur Jean-Baptiste Morin (1583-1656).
- Denis Labouré : Lire un thème avec Morin de Villefranche, Éditions Spiritualité Occidentale, 2012
- Denis Labouré, Cours pratique d'astrologie, 8 juillet 2004, 404 pages, (ISBN 978-29-11806-45-2)
- Jacques Halbronn: Intr. aux Remarques Astrologiques de J. B. Morin de Villefranche, Paris, Retz, 1975 Texte français modernisé
- Jacques Halbronn : Intr. à Le Centiloque de Ptolémée par Nicolas Bourdin, Ed Trédaniel, 1993
- Jacques Halbronn : Questions autour de l'éclipse de 1654 attribuées à Gassendi, in Gassendi et la modernité, dir. Sylvie Taussig, Brepols, 2008
- Steven Vanden Broecke : "An Astrologer in the World-System Debate. Jean-Baptiste Morin on Astrology and Copernicanism (1631-1634)", in : Copernicus Banned. The Entangled Matter of the anti-Copernican Decree of 1616, Biblioteca di Galilaeana. VIII., Museo Galileo + Istituto e Museo di Storia della Scienza, Firenze, 2018, pp. 223-241
- Robert Alan Hatch, « Morin, Jean‐Baptiste », dans The Biographical Encyclopedia of Astronomers, New York, Thomas Hockey et al., 2007 ISBN 978-0-387-31022-0
- Aurélien Ruellet, La Maison de Salomon, Presses universitaires de Rennes, 2016

== Sources ==
- O'Connor, John J.; Robertson, Edmund F., "Jean-Baptiste Morin (mathematician)", MacTutor History of Mathematics Archive, University of St Andrews
- Longitude
- The Galileo Project
- A critical edition of Morin's will and probate inventory
