= Custos Rotulorum of Derbyshire =

This is a list of people who have served as Custos Rotulorum of Derbyshire.

- Sir John Vernon bef. 1544 – aft. 1544
- Sir Francis Leke bef. 1547 – bef. 1580
- Sir John Manners 1580–1611
- George Manners bef. 1617–1617
- William Cavendish, 2nd Earl of Devonshire 1617–1628
- Edward Sackville, 4th Earl of Dorset 1628–1646
- Interregnum
- William Cavendish, 1st Duke of Newcastle 1660–1676
- Henry Cavendish, 2nd Duke of Newcastle 1677–1689
- William Cavendish, 1st Duke of Devonshire 1689–1707

For later custodes rotulorum, see Lord Lieutenant of Derbyshire.
