= Earl of Torrington =

The title of Earl of Torrington was created twice in the Peerage of England. The first creation was in 1660 as a subsidiary title of the Duke of Albemarle. Following the extinction of this title in 1688, the title was created anew in 1689, but became extinct upon the death of the first earl in 1716.

== Earls of Torrington, first creation (1660–1688) ==
- See Duke of Albemarle, including George Monck, 1st Duke of Albemarle (1608–1670) and Christopher Monck, 2nd Duke of Albemarle (1653–1688), only son of the 1st Duke, died childless.

== Earls of Torrington, second creation (1689) ==
- Arthur Herbert, 1st Earl of Torrington (1648–1716)

== See also ==
- Viscount Torrington
