= Robert Payne (natural philosopher) =

English cleric and academic, natural philosopher and experimentalist

- Born: c. 1596; Abingdon
- Died: c. 1651
- Occupations: cleric and academic

Robert Payne (1596–1651) was an English cleric and academic, known also as a natural philosopher and experimentalist. He was associated with the so-called Welbeck Academy by his position as chaplain (with duties as secretary) to William Cavendish, 1st Earl of Newcastle. The position also brought him a close friendship with Thomas Hobbes.

== Life ==
Payne was born in Abingdon, and was educated at John Roysse's Free School in Abingdon, (now Abingdon School).

He matriculated at Christ Church, Oxford in 1611, and graduated B.A. in 1614. He was a contemporary as student of William Backhouse, who later showed him friendship at the end of the First English Civil War. In 1624 he became the second Fellow of Pembroke College. He put himself forward as candidate for Gresham Professor of Astronomy in 1626.

In 1630 Payne entered the Cavendish orbit with his nomination as rector of Tormarton by the Earl of Newcastle. A mathematical correspondence with Charles Cavendish led him out of academia. He was taken on as chaplain, by April 1632, at Welbeck Abbey, where he assumed multiple roles in the household. This period of his life, from which his notability as an intellectual figure arises, was cut short in 1638. At that point Newcastle took on responsibility for the upbringing of the Prince of Wales.

Payne then returned to Oxford, as a canon of Christ Church from 1638 to 1648. He was created D.D. in 1642, and was deprived of his living in 1646. At this period Payne did what he could to circulate the ideas and manuscripts of Hobbes in Oxford, and to reduce the hostility of Gilbert Sheldon. The Parliamentary visitation of Oxford in 1648 saw Payne deprived of his college position. He ended his life with family, in Abingdon.

== Works ==
Payne was not a published author: his significant work was left in manuscript. He undertook some chemical experiments with Newcastle in the 1630s. As reported later by Newcastle, one involved lapis prunellae (a mixture here of saltpetre and brimstone), as a form of indoor firework.

He translated a work by Galileo, Della scienza mecanica, from Italian to English in 1636, from a manuscript copy. The previous year he had also translated the second half of Della misura dell'acque correnti of Benedetto Castelli, a work on fluid mechanics. The original manuscripts were obtained from Marin Mersenne, and the work was for Charles Cavendish.

Scholarly debate continues as to the possible attribution of manuscripts from the Cavendish circle to Payne: the discussion goes deeper than handwriting, since Payne acted also as a copyist. One work, the Short Tract on First Principles initially thought to be by Hobbes, is now thought by Timothy Raylor and Noel Malcolm to be by Payne. Mordechai Feingold suggests another candidate.

== See also ==
- List of Old Abingdonians
