= Edward Montagu, 1st Baron Montagu of Boughton =

English politician

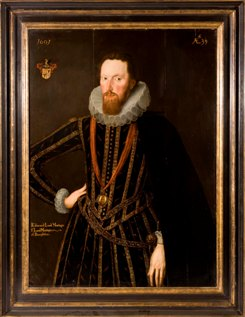
Robert Peake the Elder, Lord Edward Montagu, 1601, oil on panel, The Johnston Collection

Edward Montagu, 1st Baron Montagu of Boughton, KB (c. 1562 – 15 June 1644), also known as Sir Edward Montague of Boughton Castle, was an English politician.

== Life ==
Montagu was the son of Sir Edward Montagu and his wife Elizabeth Harington, a daughter of James Harington of Exton. He matriculated at Christ Church, Oxford in about 1574 and graduated BA on 14 March 1579. He was a student of the Middle Temple in 1580. He succeeded his father in 1602.

In 1584, he was elected Member of Parliament for Bere Alston, in 1597 for Tavistock and in 1601 for Brackley. He was created Knight of the Bath by James I at his coronation on 25 July 1603. He was appointed High Sheriff of Northamptonshire for 1595–96.

In 1604 Montagu was elected MP for Northamptonshire. On 9 February 1605, with other gentlemen of Northamptonshire, he presented a petition to the king in favour of those ministers in the county who refused subscription. The petitioners were warned that their combination "in a cause against which the king had shewed his mislike … was little less than treason." Montagu was for the time deprived of his lieutenancy and justiceship of the peace in the county. He was one of the key founders of what is known today as Guy Fawkes Night through his sponsorship, in Parliament, of the Observance of 5th November Act 1605. He was re-elected MP for Northamptonshire in 1614 for the Addled Parliament and in 1621. He was created Baron Montagu of Boughton on 29 June 1621.

Montagu supported King Charles I in the Civil War, which led to his arrest in August 1642. He was imprisoned for a time in the Tower of London, but was moved to the Savoy Hospital due to ill health, and died a prisoner in 1644. He was buried at Weekley.

== Marriages and issue ==
He married three times:

- Firstly to Elizabeth Jeffrey, the daughter and heiress of Sir John Jeffrey of Chiddingly, Sussex, by whom he had a daughter:

- Elizabeth Montagu, who married Robert Bertie, 1st Earl of Lindsey.

- Secondly he married Frances Cotton, a daughter of Thomas Cotton of Conington, Huntingdonshire, and a sister of Sir Robert Cotton, 1st Baronet, of Connington, by whom he had three sons and at least one daughter, including:

- Edward Montagu, 2nd Baron Montagu of Boughton.
- William Montagu, Chief Baron of the Exchequer.
- Christopher Montagu.
- Frances Montagu, who married John Manners, 8th Earl of Rutland.

- Thirdly he married Anne Crouch, a daughter of John Crouch of Corneybury, Hertfordshire, and widow successively of Robert Wynchell, Richard Chamberlain and Sir Ralph Hare of Stow Bardolph, Norfolk.

Peerage of England
New creation	Baron Montagu of Boughton; 1621–1644	Succeeded by Edward Montagu
