= Elizabeth Monck, Duchess of Albemarle =

English noblewoman (1654–1734)

Elizabeth Cavendish
- Duchess of Albemarle; Duchess of Montagu
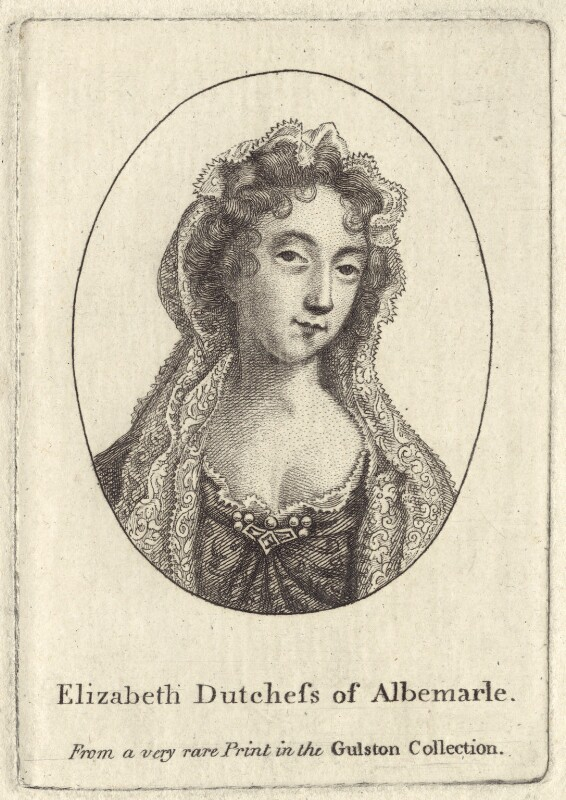
- Etched portrait of Elizabeth Monck (née Cavendish), Duchess of Albemarle, after an unknown artist
- Born: 22 February 1654
- Died: 11 September 1734 (aged 80)
- Noble family: Cavendish
- Burial place: Westminster Abbey
- Spouse(s): Christopher Monck, 2nd Duke of Albemarle (m. 1669; died 1688) Ralph Montagu, 1st Duke of Montagu (m. 1692)
- Parents: Henry Cavendish, 2nd Duke of Newcastle (father); Frances Pierrepont (mother)
- Relatives: Hon. William Pierrepont (maternal grandfather)

Elizabeth Monck, Duchess of Albemarle (22 February 1654 – 11 September 1734), later Elizabeth Montagu, Duchess of Montagu, was the eldest daughter of Henry Cavendish, 2nd Duke of Newcastle, and his wife, Frances Pierrepont (1630–1695; daughter of the Hon. William Pierrepont).

Lady Elizabeth Cavendish married Christopher Monck (later Duke of Albemarle) on 30 December 1669 at Whitehall, London. She went with her husband to Jamaica when he was appointed Lieutenant Governor in 1687; there Monck amassed a small fortune, which Elizabeth acquired and brought with her back to England upon his death in the following year (1688).

Elizabeth was given the epithet of "the Mad Duchess of Albemarle" -- viz. she declared that she would only marry into royalty and was convinced that the Kangxi Emperor of Qing Dynasty China wished to marry her. Her sister-in-law Elizabeth's stepfather, the Duke of Montagu -- suitably dressed as the Emperor of China -- asked for her hand in marriage and they were wed on 8 September 1692 in Newcastle House, London.

The comedic play The Double Gallant; or, Sick Lady's Cure (1707) was in part based on the story Duchess of Albemarle's marriage to the Duke of Montagu. "Richard, Lord Ross" -- one of her rejected suitors -- wrote the following lines of poem regarding the marriage:

Insulting rival, never boast
Thy conquest lately won;
No wonder if her heart was lost --
Her senses first were gone.

From one that's under Bedlam's laws
What glory can be had?
For love of thee was not the cause;
It proves that she was mad.

— Richard, Lord Ross (attributed)

However, the holder of the title "Lord Ross" at that time was William Ross, 12th Lord Ross.

Elizabeth died in 1734 and was buried in Westminster Abbey.

== Sources ==
- Beaulieu Palace
