= William Cavendish, 1st Duke of Newcastle =

17th-century English soldier, courtier, and arts patron (1593 – 1676)

His Grace The Duke of Newcastle upon Tyne KG KB PC MP
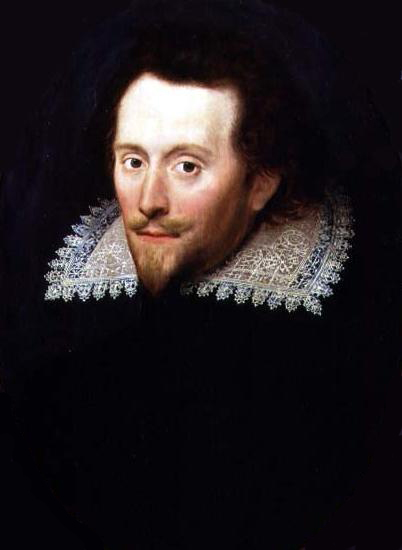
- Portrait by William Larkin, c. 1610

Lord Lieutenant of Nottinghamshire
- In office 1660–1676

Lord Lieutenant of Derbyshire
- In office 1628–1638

MP for East Retford
- In office 1614–1620

Personal details
- Born: c. 16 December 1593 Handsworth, South Yorkshire, England
- Died: 25 December 1676 (aged 83) Welbeck, Nottinghamshire, England
- Resting place: Westminster Abbey
- Spouse(s): Elizabeth Howard (1599–1643); Margaret Lucas (1623–1673)
- Relations: William, Earl of Devonshire (1590–1628); Sir Charles Cavendish (1594–1654)
- Children: Jane (1621–1669); Charles (1626–1659); Elizabeth (1626–1663); Henry, 2nd Duke of Newcastle (1630–1691); Frances
- Parent(s): Sir Charles and Lady Catherine Cavendish
- Education: St John's College, Cambridge
- Occupation: Courtier, arts patron, soldier

Military service
- Allegiance: Royalists
- Years of service: 1642—1644
- Commands: Royalist commander for the North
- Battles/wars: First English Civil War; Battle of Adwalton Moor; Siege of Hull; Battle of Marston Moor

William Cavendish, 1st Duke of Newcastle upon Tyne (c. 16 December 1593 – 25 December 1676), was an English courtier and supporter of the arts. He was a renowned horse breeder, as well as being patron of the playwright Ben Jonson and the intellectual group known as the Welbeck Circle.

Despite spending the then enormous sum of £15,000 entertaining Charles I in 1634, he failed to gain a significant political post. In the early stages of the First English Civil War, he was appointed Royalist Captain-General in Northern England; he financed much of the war effort himself, later claiming this totalled in excess of £1,000,000. After the defeat at Marston Moor in July 1644, a battle fought against his advice, he went into exile in Europe.

He returned to England after the Stuart Restoration in 1660, and although created Duke of Newcastle in 1665, he remained on the fringes of the court and became critical of Charles II. He died in 1676 and was buried in Westminster Abbey.

== Personal details ==
William Cavendish was born at Handsworth, South Yorkshire, the eldest surviving son of Sir Charles Cavendish and Catherine Ogle, descended from the Barons Ogle. He was a grandson of Bess of Hardwick and courtier William Cavendish. He had a younger brother, Charles (1594–1654), and the two remained close friends throughout their lives.

In 1618, Cavendish married Elizabeth Howard (1599–1643), with whom he had five children – Jane (1621–1669), Charles (1626–1659), Elizabeth (1626–1663), Henry, 2nd Duke of Newcastle (1630–1691), and Frances. Encouraged by their father, Jane and Elizabeth became minor poets and writers. In 1645, he married Margaret Lucas, a natural philosopher and writer. With his help and support, she became a popular writer of plays, poetry, and fiction, and was known as "mad Madge" for her extravagant style and affected manner. See Wikipedia Henry Cavendish 2nd Duke of Newcastle, which states Cavendish was the only surviving son of William Cavendish 1st Duke of Newcastle and his first wife Elizabeth Basset whose maternal grandparents were William Basset and Judith Austen the daughter of Thomas Austen

== Career ==
Created a Knight of the Bath in 1610, he was elected Member of Parliament for East Retford in the 1614 "Addled Parliament" and succeeded his father in 1617. Cavendish was created 'Viscount Mansfield' in 1620 and 'Earl of Newcastle-upon-Tyne' in 1628 but failed to achieve high office, despite spending the enormous sum of £15,000 entertaining Charles I in 1634. However, in 1638 he was appointed governor of the Prince of Wales, then made a Privy Counsellor. When the Bishops' Wars began in 1639, he provided the king with a loan of £10,000 and a troop of volunteer horse. He was appointed Gentleman of the Robes in 1641, but was implicated in the Army Plot, and withdrew for a time from the court.

Northern England 1642-1644

As tension increased, both Charles and Parliament tried to secure key ports and weapons; an attempt by Newcastle to capture Hull in July failed. When Charles formally declared war in August, Newcastle was given command of the four northern counties, largely because he was willing to pay for his own troops. In November 1642, he advanced into Yorkshire, raised the siege of York, and forced Lord Fairfax to retire after attacking him at Tadcaster.

Fighting continued during the winter, as Newcastle tried to secure a landing place for an arms convoy organised by Henrietta Maria, who was in the Dutch Republic purchasing weapons. He had insufficient troops to hold the entire area, and Parliamentary forces under Lord Fairfax and his son Sir Thomas, retained key towns like Hull, and Leeds. In late February 1643, a convoy with Henrietta Maria and weapons landed at Bridlington, and was escorted to Oxford. This success, combined with a victory at Adwalton Moor near Leeds in June, caused Newcastle to be created 'Marquess of Newcastle-upon-Tyne'.

The 1643 Solemn League and Covenant had created a Committee of Both Kingdoms, which for the first time co-ordinated Parliamentary strategy in all three war zones, England, Scotland and Ireland. In February 1644, the Scots under Leven besieged Newcastle, closing the major import point for Royalist war supplies. They made little progress, with the Marquess-based nearby at Durham.

Two weeks later, the Earl of Manchester defeated a Royalist force at Selby. Newcastle had to leave Durham, and garrison York, which city was besieged by the Scots, Sir Thomas Fairfax, and Manchester's Army of the Eastern Association. In May, Prince Rupert left Shrewsbury and marched north; on 29 June he arrived at Knaresborough, 30 kilometres from York, to find he was faced by a superior force. Despite Newcastle's opposition, the largest battle of the war took place on 2 July at Marston Moor. The result was a decisive Royalist defeat that lost them the North, while York surrendered on 16 July.

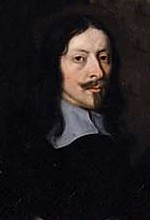
Newcastle served as Royalist Captain-General from 1642 to 1644.

As a military commander, Lord Clarendon described Newcastle as "fit to be a general as a bishop". However, Marston Moor was fought against his advice, while he was also intelligent enough to understand his limits, and recruited reliable subordinates. After Marston Moor, Newcastle left England for Hamburg, accompanied by his two sons and his brother Charles; in April 1645 they moved to Paris, where he met and married his second wife Margaret, maid of honour to Queen Henrietta Maria. While there, Newcastle continued his feud with Prince Rupert, suggesting to the Queen he should be removed from command.

The new Marchioness was a dramatist and romancer, and had been maid of honour to Queen Henrietta Maria. Their marriage appears to have been a very happy one, and she later wrote a biography of him. His love and admiration for his wife is best expressed in the fine sonnet he wrote as an introduction to her masterpiece The Blazing World.

Newcastle left in 1648 for Rotterdam with the intention of joining the Prince of Wales in command of the rebellious navy, and finally took up his abode at Antwerp, where he remained till the Restoration. In April 1650 he was appointed a member of Charles II's privy council, and in opposition to Edward Hyde advocated the agreement with the Scots. In Antwerp he lived in the Rubenshuis (the house where the painter Peter Paul Rubens had lived from 1610 till his death in 1640) and established his famous riding-school, exercised "the art of manège" (High School riding), and published his first work on horsemanship, Méthode et invention nouvelle de dresser les chevaux in 1658. This work had an influence on one of the greatest French riding masters, François Robichon de La Guérinière, as well as a more controversial figure in dressage, Baucher. He is also said to be the inventor of draw reins.

== Restoration ==
Restoration of Marquis of Newcastle Act 1660
- Act of Parliament
- Parliament of England
- Long title: An Act for restoring unto William Marquis of Newcastle, all his Honours, Manors, Lands, and Tenements, in England, whereof he was in Possession on the 20th Day of May, 1640, or at any Time since.
- Citation: 12 Cha. 2. c. 4 Pr.
- Territorial extent: England and Wales

Dates
- Royal assent: 13 September 1660
- Commencement: 25 April 1660 (Note: Start of session.)

Status: Current legislation

After the 1660 Stuart Restoration, Newcastle returned to England and succeeded in regaining the greater part of his estates, though burdened with debts, his wife estimating his total losses in the war at the enormous sum of £941,303. He was reinstated in the offices he had filled under Charles I and appointed a Gentleman of the Bedchamber. He was invested in 1661 with the Order of the Garter which had been bestowed upon him in 1650, and was advanced to a dukedom (of Newcastle-on-Tyne) on 16 March 1665.

He retired, however, from politics and occupied himself with his estate and with his favourite pursuit of training horses. He established a racecourse near Welbeck, and in this period his grace composed his second work on horsemanship, a sequel to his previous work. In his later years, he suffered from Parkinson's disease, and the sudden death of his second wife was a blow from which he never recovered. With John Dryden's assistance he translated Molière's L'Etourdi as Sir Martin Mar-all (1688). He contributed scenes to his wife's plays, and poems of his composition are to be found among her works.

Cavendish was the patron of, among others, Jonson, Shirley, Davenant, Dryden, Shadwell and Flecknoe, and of Hobbes, Gassendi and Descartes. During their stay in Antwerp, the Cavendishes had a music chapel of 5 musicians. They were acquainted with several of the contemporary English composers, and Newcastle's library contained a substantial collection of music of these composers.

The department of Manuscripts and Special Collections, The University of Nottingham holds a number of papers relating to the 1st Duke: the Cavendish Papers (Pw 1), part of the Portland (Welbeck) Collection, includes some of his personal papers; the Portland Literary Collection (Pw V), also part of the Portland (Welbeck) Collection, contains many of his literary papers; and the Newcastle (Clumber) Collection (Ne) includes some estate papers from the time of the 1st Duke, for example, relating to his purchase of Nottingham Castle.

== Works by William Cavendish ==
- Méthode et invention nouvelle de dresser les chevaux (1658)
- A New Method and Extraordinary Invention to Dress Horses and Work them according to Nature... (1667)
  - (in French) La methode et inuention nouuelle de dresser les cheuaux par le tres-noble, haut, et tres-puissant prince Guillaume marquis et comte de Newcastle ..., 1658
- Truthe of the Sworde (1676)

Plays:

- The Country Captain, or Captain Underwit (printed 1649)
- The Varietie (printed 1649)
- The Humorous Lovers (performed 1667, printed 1677)
- The Triumphant Widow (performed 1674, printed 1677)

== Coat of arms ==
Coat of arms of William Cavendish, 1st Duke of Newcastle
Coronet A coronet of an Duke Crest A serpent nowed proper. Escutcheon Sable three bucks' heads cabossed argent, with a crescent for different. Supporters Dexter, a bull or, ducally crowned gules; sinister, a lion ramp, guard, gules crined and ducally crowned or. Motto Cavendo tutus Safe through Caution

== Sources ==
- Hattersley, Roy (2013). The Devonshires: The Story of a Family and a Nation (2013 ed.). Chatto & Windus. ISBN 9780701186241. biography
- Hulse, Lynn (2011). "Cavendish, William, first duke of Newcastle upon Tyne". Oxford Dictionary of National Biography (Online ed.). Oxford University Press. doi:10.1093/ref:odnb/4946. (Subscription, Wikipedia Library access or UK public library membership required.)
- Royle, Trevor (2004). Civil War: The Wars of the Three Kingdoms 1638–1660 (2006 ed.). Abacus. ISBN 978-0-349-11564-1.
- Trease, Geoffrey (1979). Portrait of a Cavalier: William Cavendish, First Duke of Newcastle. Macmillan. ISBN 978-0-33322-760-2. biography
- Wedgwood, CV (1958). The King's War, 1641-1647 (2001 ed.). Penguin Classics. ISBN 978-0141390727.
- Worsley, Lucy (2007). Cavalier: A Tale of Chivalry, Passion and Great Houses (2007 ed.). Faber and Faber. ISBN 978-0571227037. biography

Political offices
Vacant Title last held by The Earl of Shrewsbury	Lord Lieutenant of Nottinghamshire; 1626–1642	English Interregnum
Preceded by Sir Ralph Delaval	Custos Rotulorum of Northumberland; 1628–1632	Succeeded by Sir William Widdrington
Preceded by The Earl of Devonshire	Lord Lieutenant of Derbyshire; 1628–1638	Succeeded by The Earl of Devonshire
Preceded by The Earl of Exeter	Custos Rotulorum of Nottinghamshire; 1640–1646	English Interregnum
Honorary titles
English Interregnum	Custos Rotulorum of Derbyshire; 1660–1676	Succeeded by The Duke of Newcastle
English Interregnum	Lord Lieutenant and Custos Rotulorum of Nottinghamshire; 1660–1676	Succeeded by The Duke of Newcastle
Preceded by The Earl of Northumberland	Lord Lieutenant of Northumberland jointly with Earl of Ogle; 1670–1676	Succeeded by The Duke of Newcastle
Legal offices
Preceded by The Earl of Rutland	Justice in Eyre north of the Trent; 1661–1676	Succeeded by The Duke of Newcastle
Peerage of England
New creation	Duke of Newcastle-upon-Tyne; 1665–1676	Succeeded by Henry Cavendish
New creation	Marquess of Newcastle-upon-Tyne; 1643–1676	Succeeded by Henry Cavendish
New creation	Earl of Newcastle-upon-Tyne; 1628–1676	Succeeded by Henry Cavendish
New creation	Viscount Mansfield; 1620–1676	Succeeded by Henry Cavendish
Preceded by Catherine Ogle	Baron Ogle; 1629–1676	Succeeded by Henry Cavendish
