= Claude Mydorge =

French mathematician

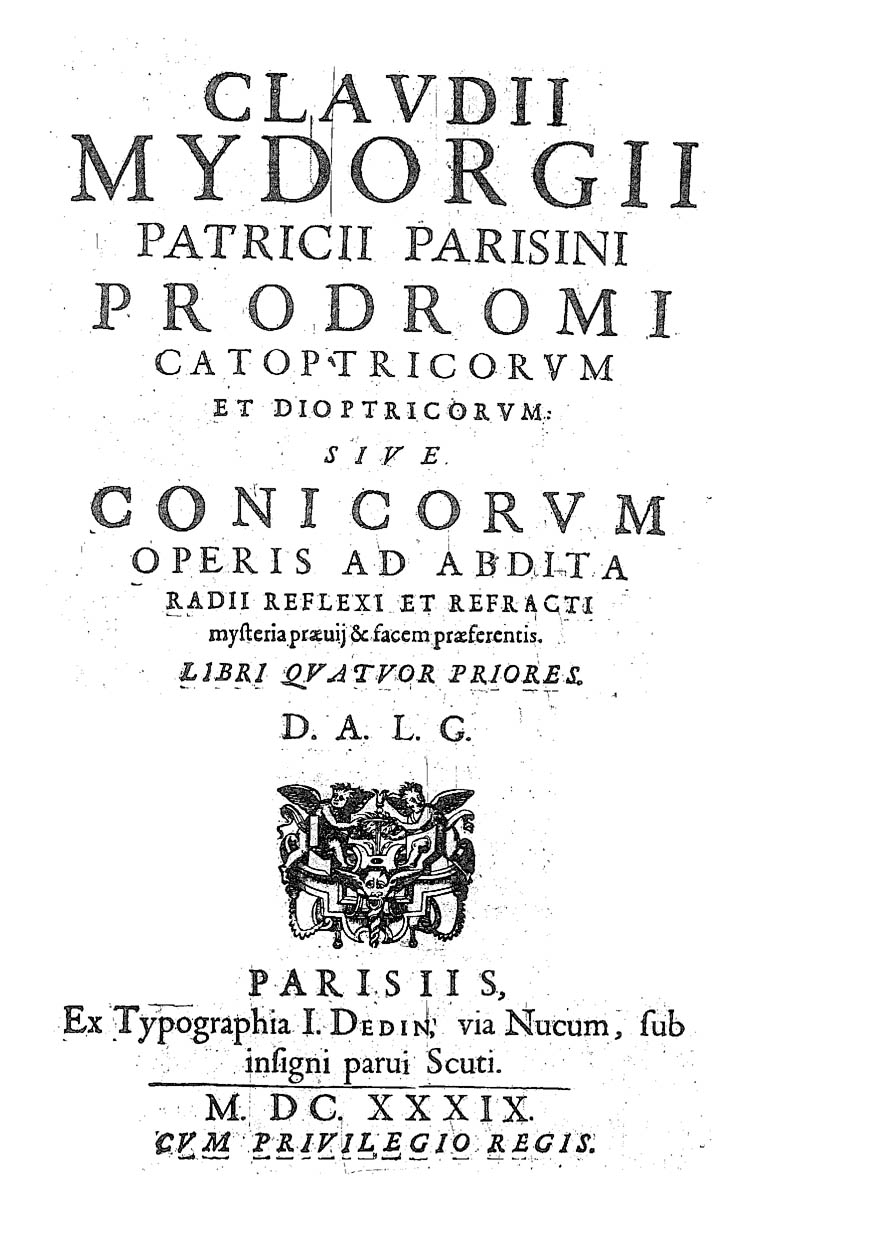
Prodromi catoptricorum et dioptricorum sive Conicorum operis ad abdita radii reflexi et refracti mysteria praevij et facem praeferentis, 1639

Claude Mydorge (1585 – July 1647) was a French mathematician. His primary contributions were in geometry and physics.

Mydorge served on a scientific committee (whose members included Pierre Hérigone and Étienne Pascal) set up to determine whether Jean-Baptiste Morin's scheme for determining longitude from the Moon's motion was practical.

== Works ==
- Mydorge, Claude (1625). Usage de l'un et l'autre astrolabe particulier et universel (in French). Jean Moreau.
- Mydorge, Claude (1639). Prodromi catoptricorum et dioptricorum sive Conicorum operis ad abdita radii reflexi et refracti mysteria praevij et facem praeferentis (in Latin). Isaac Dedin.
