= List of peers 1740–1749 =

This page lists all peers who held extant titles between 1740 and 1749.

== Peerage of England, Scotland and Great Britain ==
=== Dukes ===
Title	Holder	Date gained	Date lost	Notes
Peerage of England
Duke of Cornwall (1337)	Frederick, Prince of Wales	1727	1751	
Duke of Norfolk (1483)	Edward Howard, 9th Duke of Norfolk	1732	1777	
Duke of Somerset (1547)	Charles Seymour, 6th Duke of Somerset	1678	1748	Died
Duke of Somerset (1547)	Algernon Seymour, 7th Duke of Somerset	1748	1750	
Duke of Cleveland (1670)	William FitzRoy, 3rd Duke of Cleveland	1730	1774	
Duke of Richmond (1675)	Charles Lennox, 2nd Duke of Richmond	1723	1750	
Duke of Grafton (1675)	Charles FitzRoy, 2nd Duke of Grafton	1690	1757	
Duke of Beaufort (1682)	Henry Scudamore, 3rd Duke of Beaufort	1714	1745	Died
Duke of Beaufort (1682)	Charles Somerset, 4th Duke of Beaufort	1745	1756	
Duke of St Albans (1684)	Charles Beauclerk, 2nd Duke of St Albans	1726	1751	
Duke of Bolton (1689)	Charles Powlett, 3rd Duke of Bolton	1722	1754	
Duke of Leeds (1694)	Thomas Osborne, 4th Duke of Leeds	1731	1789	
Duke of Bedford (1694)	John Russell, 4th Duke of Bedford	1732	1771	
Duke of Devonshire (1694)	William Cavendish, 3rd Duke of Devonshire	1729	1755	
Duke of Marlborough (1702)	Charles Spencer, 3rd Duke of Marlborough	1733	1758	
Duke of Rutland (1703)	John Manners, 3rd Duke of Rutland	1721	1779	
Duke of Montagu (1705)	John Montagu, 2nd Duke of Montagu	1709	1749	Died, title extinct
Peerage of Scotland
Duke of Hamilton (1643)	James Hamilton, 5th Duke of Hamilton	1712	1743	Died
Duke of Hamilton (1643)	James Hamilton, 6th Duke of Hamilton	1743	1758	
Duke of Buccleuch (1663)	Francis Scott, 2nd Duke of Buccleuch	1732	1751	
Duke of Queensberry (1684)	Charles Douglas, 3rd Duke of Queensberry	1711	1778	
Duke of Gordon (1684)	Cosmo Gordon, 3rd Duke of Gordon	1728	1752	
Duke of Argyll (1701)	John Campbell, 2nd Duke of Argyll	1703	1743	Died
Duke of Argyll (1701)	Archibald Campbell, 3rd Duke of Argyll	1743	1761	
Duke of Atholl (1703)	James Murray, 2nd Duke of Atholl	1724	1764	
Duke of Douglas (1703)	Archibald Douglas, 1st Duke of Douglas	1703	1761	
Duke of Montrose (1707)	James Graham, 1st Duke of Montrose	1707	1742	Died
Duke of Montrose (1707)	William Graham, 2nd Duke of Montrose	1742	1790	
Duke of Roxburghe (1707)	John Ker, 1st Duke of Roxburghe	1707	1741	Died
Duke of Roxburghe (1707)	Robert Ker, 2nd Duke of Roxburghe	1741	1755	
Peerage of Great Britain
Duke of Kent (1710)	Henry Grey, 1st Duke of Kent	1710	1740	Died, title extinct
Duke of Ancaster and Kesteven (1715)	Peregrine Bertie, 2nd Duke of Ancaster and Kesteven	1723	1742	Died
Duke of Ancaster and Kesteven (1715)	Peregrine Bertie, 3rd Duke of Ancaster and Kesteven	1742	1778	
Duke of Kingston-upon-Hull (1715)	Evelyn Pierrepont, 2nd Duke of Kingston-upon-Hull	1726	1773	
Duke of Newcastle (1715)	Thomas Pelham-Holles, 1st Duke of Newcastle	1715	1768	
Duke of Portland (1716)	William Bentinck, 2nd Duke of Portland	1726	1762	
Duchess of Kendal (1719)	Melusine von der Schulenburg, Duchess of Kendal	1719	1743	Died, title extinct
Duke of Manchester (1719)	Robert Montagu, 3rd Duke of Manchester	1739	1762	
Duke of Chandos (1719)	James Brydges, 1st Duke of Chandos	1719	1744	Died
Duke of Chandos (1719)	Henry Brydges, 2nd Duke of Chandos	1744	1771	
Duke of Dorset (1720)	Lionel Sackville, 1st Duke of Dorset	1720	1765	
Duke of Bridgewater (1720)	Scroop Egerton, 1st Duke of Bridgewater	1720	1745	Died
Duke of Bridgewater (1720)	John Egerton, 2nd Duke of Bridgewater	1745	1748	Died
Duke of Bridgewater (1720)	Francis Egerton, 3rd Duke of Bridgewater	1748	1803	
Duke of Cumberland (1726)	Prince William, Duke of Cumberland	1726	1765	

=== Marquesses ===
Title	Holder	Date gained	Date lost	Notes
Peerage of England
Marquess of Powis (1687)	William Herbert, 2nd Marquess of Powis	1696	1745	Died
Marquess of Powis (1687)	William Herbert, 3rd Marquess of Powis	1745	1748	Died, title extinct
Peerage of Scotland
Marquess of Tweeddale (1694)	John Hay, 4th Marquess of Tweeddale	1715	1762	
Marquess of Lothian (1701)	William Kerr, 3rd Marquess of Lothian	1722	1767	
Marquess of Annandale (1701)	George Vanden-Bempde, 3rd Marquess of Annandale	1730	1792	
Peerage of Great Britain
Marquess Grey (1740)	Jemima Yorke, 2nd Marchioness Grey	1740	1797	Title previously held by the Duke of Kent
Marquess of Rockingham (1746)	Thomas Watson-Wentworth, 1st Marquess of Rockingham	1746	1750	New creation

=== Earls ===
Title	Holder	Date gained	Date lost	Notes
Peerage of England
Earl of Shrewsbury (1442)	Gilbert Talbot, 13th Earl of Shrewsbury	1718	1743	Died
Earl of Shrewsbury (1442)	George Talbot, 14th Earl of Shrewsbury	1743	1787	
Earl of Derby (1485)	Edward Stanley, 11th Earl of Derby	1736	1776	
Earl of Huntingdon (1529)	Theophilus Hastings, 9th Earl of Huntingdon	1705	1746	Died
Earl of Huntingdon (1529)	Francis Hastings, 10th Earl of Huntingdon	1746	1789	
Earl of Pembroke (1551)	Henry Herbert, 9th Earl of Pembroke	1733	1749	Died
Earl of Pembroke (1551)	Henry Herbert, 10th Earl of Pembroke	1749	1794	
Earl of Devon (1553)	William Courtenay, de jure 7th Earl of Devon	1735	1762	
Earl of Lincoln (1572)	Henry Clinton, 9th Earl of Lincoln	1730	1794	
Earl of Suffolk (1603)	Henry Howard, 10th Earl of Suffolk	1733	1745	Died
Earl of Suffolk (1603)	Henry Howard, 11th Earl of Suffolk	1745	1757	
Earl of Exeter (1605)	Brownlow Cecil, 8th Earl of Exeter	1722	1754	
Earl of Salisbury (1605)	James Cecil, 6th Earl of Salisbury	1728	1780	
Earl of Northampton (1618)	James Compton, 5th Earl of Northampton	1727	1754	
Earl of Leicester (1618)	Jocelyn Sidney, 7th Earl of Leicester	1737	1743	Died, title extinct
Earl of Warwick (1618)	Edward Rich, 8th Earl of Warwick	1721	1759	
Earl of Denbigh (1622)	William Feilding, 5th Earl of Denbigh	1717	1755	
Earl of Westmorland (1624)	John Fane, 7th Earl of Westmorland	1736	1762	
Earl of Berkshire (1626)	Henry Howard, 4th Earl of Berkshire	1706	1757	Succeeded to the more senior Earldom of Suffolk, see above
Earl of Peterborough (1628)	Charles Mordaunt, 4th Earl of Peterborough	1735	1779	
Earl of Stamford (1628)	Harry Grey, 4th Earl of Stamford	1739	1768	
Earl of Winchilsea (1628)	Daniel Finch, 8th Earl of Winchilsea	1730	1769	
Earl of Chesterfield (1628)	Philip Stanhope, 4th Earl of Chesterfield	1726	1773	
Earl of Thanet (1628)	Sackville Tufton, 7th Earl of Thanet	1729	1753	
Earl of Sandwich (1660)	John Montagu, 4th Earl of Sandwich	1729	1792	
Earl of Anglesey (1661)	Richard Annesley, 6th Earl of Anglesey	1737	1761	
Earl of Cardigan (1661)	George Brudenell, 4th Earl of Cardigan	1732	1790	
Earl of Clarendon (1661)	Henry Hyde, 4th Earl of Clarendon	1723	1753	
Earl of Essex (1661)	William Capell, 3rd Earl of Essex	1710	1743	Died
Earl of Essex (1661)	William Capell, 4th Earl of Essex	1743	1799	
Earl of Carlisle (1661)	Henry Howard, 4th Earl of Carlisle	1738	1758	
Earl of Ailesbury (1664)	Thomas Bruce, 2nd Earl of Ailesbury	1685	1741	Died
Earl of Ailesbury (1664)	Charles Bruce, 3rd Earl of Ailesbury	1741	1747	Died, title extinct; Earldom of Elgin succeeded by a cousin
Earl of Burlington (1664)	Richard Boyle, 3rd Earl of Burlington	1704	1753	Earl of Cork in the Peerage of Ireland
Earl of Shaftesbury (1672)	Anthony Ashley Cooper, 4th Earl of Shaftesbury	1713	1771	
Earl of Lichfield (1674)	George Lee, 2nd Earl of Lichfield	1716	1742	Died
Earl of Lichfield (1674)	George Lee, 3rd Earl of Lichfield	1742	1772	
Earl of Radnor (1679)	Henry Robartes, 3rd Earl of Radnor	1723	1741	Died
Earl of Radnor (1679)	John Robartes, 4th Earl of Radnor	1741	1757	
Earl of Berkeley (1679)	Augustus Berkeley, 4th Earl of Berkeley	1736	1755	
Earl of Abingdon (1682)	Montagu Venables-Bertie, 2nd Earl of Abingdon	1699	1743	Died
Earl of Abingdon (1682)	Willoughby Bertie, 3rd Earl of Abingdon	1743	1760	
Earl of Gainsborough (1682)	Baptist Noel, 4th Earl of Gainsborough	1714	1751	
Earl of Plymouth (1682)	Other Windsor, 4th Earl of Plymouth	1732	1771	
Earl of Holderness (1682)	Robert Darcy, 4th Earl of Holderness	1722	1778	
Earl of Stafford (1688)	William Stafford-Howard, 3rd Earl of Stafford	1734	1751	
Earl of Warrington (1690)	George Booth, 2nd Earl of Warrington	1694	1758	
Earl of Scarbrough (1690)	Thomas Lumley-Saunderson, 3rd Earl of Scarbrough	1739	1752	
Earl of Bradford (1694)	Thomas Newport, 4th Earl of Bradford	1734	1762	
Earl of Rochford (1695)	William Nassau de Zuylestein, 4th Earl of Rochford	1738	1781	
Earl of Albemarle (1697)	Willem van Keppel, 2nd Earl of Albemarle	1718	1754	
Earl of Coventry (1697)	William Coventry, 5th Earl of Coventry	1719	1751	
Earl of Jersey (1697)	William Villiers, 3rd Earl of Jersey	1721	1769	
Earl of Grantham (1698)	Henry de Nassau d'Auverquerque, 1st Earl of Grantham	1698	1754	
Earl Poulett (1706)	John Poulett, 1st Earl Poulett	1706	1743	Died
Earl Poulett (1706)	John Poulett, 2nd Earl Poulett	1743	1764	
Earl of Godolphin (1706)	Francis Godolphin, 2nd Earl of Godolphin	1712	1766	
Earl of Cholmondeley (1706)	George Cholmondeley, 3rd Earl of Cholmondeley	1733	1770	
Peerage of Scotland
Earl of Crawford (1398)	John Lindsay, 20th Earl of Crawford	1713	1749	Died
Earl of Crawford (1398)	George Lindsay-Crawford, 21st Earl of Crawford	1749	1781	
Earl of Erroll (1452)	Mary Hay, 14th Countess of Erroll	1717	1758	
Earl of Sutherland (1235)	William Sutherland, 17th Earl of Sutherland	1733	1750	
Earl of Rothes (1458)	John Leslie, 10th Earl of Rothes	1722	1767	
Earl of Morton (1458)	James Douglas, 14th Earl of Morton	1738	1768	
Earl of Glencairn (1488)	William Cunningham, 13th Earl of Glencairn	1734	1775	
Earl of Eglinton (1507)	Alexander Montgomerie, 10th Earl of Eglinton	1729	1769	
Earl of Cassilis (1509)	John Kennedy, 8th Earl of Cassilis	1701	1759	
Earl of Caithness (1455)	Alexander Sinclair, 9th Earl of Caithness	1705	1765	
Earl of Buchan (1469)	David Erskine, 9th Earl of Buchan	1695	1745	Died
Earl of Buchan (1469)	Henry Erskine, 10th Earl of Buchan	1745	1767	
Earl of Moray (1562)	James Stuart, 8th Earl of Moray	1739	1767	
Earl of Home (1605)	William Home, 8th Earl of Home	1720	1761	
Earl of Wigtown (1606)	John Fleming, 6th Earl of Wigtown	1681	1744	Died
Earl of Wigtown (1606)	Charles Fleming, 7th Earl of Wigtown	1744	1747	Died, title extinct
Earl of Abercorn (1606)	James Hamilton, 7th Earl of Abercorn	1734	1744	Died
Earl of Abercorn (1606)	James Hamilton, 8th Earl of Abercorn	1744	1789	
Earl of Strathmore and Kinghorne (1606)	Thomas Lyon, 8th Earl of Strathmore and Kinghorne	1735	1753	
Earl of Kellie (1619)	Alexander Erskine, 5th Earl of Kellie	1710	1758	
Earl of Haddington (1619)	Thomas Hamilton, 7th Earl of Haddington	1735	1794	
Earl of Galloway (1623)	James Stewart, 5th Earl of Galloway	1694	1746	Died
Earl of Galloway (1623)	Alexander Stewart, 6th Earl of Galloway	1746	1773	
Earl of Lauderdale (1624)	Charles Maitland, 6th Earl of Lauderdale	1710	1744	Died
Earl of Lauderdale (1624)	James Maitland, 7th Earl of Lauderdale	1744	1789	
Earl of Loudoun (1633)	John Campbell, 4th Earl of Loudoun	1731	1782	
Earl of Kinnoull (1633)	George Hay, 8th Earl of Kinnoull	1709	1758	
Earl of Dumfries (1633)	Penelope Crichton, 4th Countess of Dumfries	1694	1742	Died
Earl of Dumfries (1633)	William Dalrymple-Crichton, 5th Earl of Dumfries	1742	1769	
Earl of Elgin (1633)	Charles Bruce, 5th Earl of Elgin	1747	1771	Title previously held by the Earl of Ailesbury
Earl of Traquair (1633)	Charles Stewart, 4th Earl of Traquair	1673	1741	Died
Earl of Traquair (1633)	Charles Stewart, 5th Earl of Traquair	1741	1764	
Earl of Wemyss (1633)	James Wemyss, 5th Earl of Wemyss	1720	1756	
Earl of Dalhousie (1633)	Charles Ramsay, 7th Earl of Dalhousie	1739	1764	
Earl of Findlater (1638)	James Ogilvy, 5th Earl of Findlater	1730	1764	
Earl of Leven (1641)	Alexander Leslie, 5th Earl of Leven	1728	1754	
Earl of Dysart (1643)	Lionel Tollemache, 4th Earl of Dysart	1727	1770	
Earl of Selkirk (1646)	John Hamilton, 3rd Earl of Selkirk	1739	1744	Died
Earl of Selkirk (1646)	Dunbar Douglas, 4th Earl of Selkirk	1744	1799	
Earl of Northesk (1647)	David Carnegie, 5th Earl of Northesk	1729	1741	Died
Earl of Northesk (1647)	George Carnegie, 6th Earl of Northesk	1741	1792	
Earl of Kincardine (1647)	Thomas Bruce, 7th Earl of Kincardine	1721	1740	Died
Earl of Kincardine (1647)	William Bruce, 8th Earl of Kincardine	1740	1740	
Earl of Kincardine (1647)	Charles Bruce, 9th Earl of Kincardine	1740	1771	Succeeded to the more senior Earldom of Elgin, see above
Earl of Balcarres (1651)	James Lindsay, 5th Earl of Balcarres	1736	1768	
Earl of Aboyne (1660)	Charles Gordon, 4th Earl of Aboyne	1732	1794	
Earl of Newburgh (1660)	Charles Livingston, 2nd Earl of Newburgh	1670	1755	
Earl of Kilmarnock (1661)	William Boyd, 4th Earl of Kilmarnock	1717	1746	Attainted
Earl of Dundonald (1669)	William Cochrane, 7th Earl of Dundonald	1737	1758	
Earl of Dumbarton (1675)	George Douglas, 2nd Earl of Dumbarton	1692	1749	Died, peerage extinct
Earl of Kintore (1677)	John Keith, 3rd Earl of Kintore	1718	1758	
Earl of Breadalbane and Holland (1677)	John Campbell, 2nd Earl of Breadalbane and Holland	1717	1752	
Earl of Aberdeen (1682)	William Gordon, 2nd Earl of Aberdeen	1720	1746	Died
Earl of Aberdeen (1682)	George Gordon, 3rd Earl of Aberdeen	1746	1801	
Earl of Dunmore (1686)	John Murray, 2nd Earl of Dunmore	1710	1752	
Earl of Orkney (1696)	Anne O'Brien, 2nd Countess of Orkney	1737	1756	
Earl of Ruglen (1697)	Anne Hamilton, 2nd Countess of Ruglen	1744	1748	Title previously held by the Earl of Selkirk; died, title succeeded by the Earl of March
Earl of March (1697)	William Douglas, 3rd Earl of March	1731	1810	
Earl of Marchmont (1697)	Alexander Hume-Campbell, 2nd Earl of Marchmont	1724	1740	Died
Earl of Marchmont (1697)	Hugh Hume-Campbell, 3rd Earl of Marchmont	1740	1794	
Earl of Hyndford (1701)	John Carmichael, 3rd Earl of Hyndford	1737	1766	
Earl of Cromartie (1703)	George Mackenzie, 3rd Earl of Cromartie	1731	1746	Attainted
Earl of Stair (1703)	John Dalrymple, 2nd Earl of Stair	1707	1747	Died
Earl of Stair (1703)	James Dalrymple, 3rd Earl of Stair	1747	1760	
Earl of Rosebery (1703)	James Primrose, 2nd Earl of Rosebery	1723	1765	
Earl of Glasgow (1703)	John Boyle, 2nd Earl of Glasgow	1733	1740	Died
Earl of Glasgow (1703)	John Boyle, 3rd Earl of Glasgow	1740	1775	
Earl of Portmore (1703)	Charles Colyear, 2nd Earl of Portmore	1730	1785	
Earl of Bute (1703)	John Stuart, 3rd Earl of Bute	1723	1792	
Earl of Hopetoun (1703)	Charles Hope, 1st Earl of Hopetoun	1703	1742	Died
Earl of Hopetoun (1703)	John Hope, 2nd Earl of Hopetoun	1742	1781	
Earl of Deloraine (1706)	Henry Scott, 3rd Earl of Deloraine	1739	1740	Died
Earl of Deloraine (1706)	Henry Scott, 4th Earl of Deloraine	1740	1807	
Earl of Ilay (1706)	Archibald Campbell, 1st Earl of Ilay	1706	1761	Succeeded to the Dukedom of Argyll, see above
Peerage of Great Britain
Earl of Oxford and Mortimer (1711)	Edward Harley, 2nd Earl of Oxford and Earl Mortimer	1724	1741	Died
Earl of Oxford and Mortimer (1711)	Edward Harley, 3rd Earl of Oxford and Earl Mortimer	1741	1755	
Earl of Strafford (1711)	William Wentworth, 2nd Earl of Strafford	1739	1791	
Earl Ferrers (1711)	Henry Shirley, 3rd Earl Ferrers	1729	1745	Died
Earl Ferrers (1711)	Laurence Shirley, 4th Earl Ferrers	1745	1760	
Earl of Dartmouth (1711)	William Legge, 1st Earl of Dartmouth	1711	1750	
Earl of Tankerville (1714)	Charles Bennet, 2nd Earl of Tankerville	1722	1753	
Earl of Aylesford (1714)	Heneage Finch, 2nd Earl of Aylesford	1740	1757	
Earl of Bristol (1714)	John Hervey, 1st Earl of Bristol	1714	1751	
Earl of Rockingham (1714)	Lewis Watson, 2nd Earl of Rockingham	1724	1745	Died
Earl of Rockingham (1714)	Thomas Watson, 3rd Earl of Rockingham	1745	1746	Died; Peerage extinct
Earl of Uxbridge (1714)	Henry Paget, 1st Earl of Uxbridge	1714	1743	Died
Earl of Uxbridge (1714)	Henry Paget, 2nd Earl of Uxbridge	1743	1769	
Earl Granville (1715)	Grace Carteret, 1st Countess Granville	1715	1744	Died
Earl Granville (1715)	John Carteret, 2nd Earl Granville	1744	1763	
Earl of Halifax (1715)	George Montagu-Dunk, 2nd Earl of Halifax	1739	1771	
Earl of Sussex (1717)	George Yelverton, 2nd Earl of Sussex	1731	1758	
Earl Cowper (1718)	William Clavering-Cowper, 2nd Earl Cowper	1723	1764	
Earl Stanhope (1718)	Philip Stanhope, 2nd Earl Stanhope	1721	1786	
Earl Coningsby (1719)	Margaret Newton, 2nd Countess Coningsby	1729	1761	
Earl of Harborough (1719)	Philip Sherard, 2nd Earl of Harborough	1732	1750	
Earl of Macclesfield (1721)	George Parker, 2nd Earl of Macclesfield	1732	1764	
Earl of Pomfret (1721)	Thomas Fermor, 1st Earl of Pomfret	1721	1753	
Countess of Walsingham (1722)	Melusina von der Schulenburg, Countess of Walsingham	1722	1778	
Earl Graham of Belford (1722)	William Graham, 1st Earl Graham	1722	1790	Succeeded to the Dukedom of Montrose, see above
Earl Ker (1722)	Robert Ker, 1st Earl Ker	1722	1790	Succeeded to the Dukedom of Roxburghe, see above
Earl Waldegrave (1729)	James Waldegrave, 1st Earl Waldegrave	1729	1741	Died
Earl Waldegrave (1729)	James Waldegrave, 2nd Earl Waldegrave	1741	1763	
Earl of Ashburnham (1730)	John Ashburnham, 2nd Earl of Ashburnham	1737	1812	
Earl of Wilmington (1730)	Spencer Compton, 1st Earl of Wilmington	1730	1743	Died; Peerage extinct
Earl FitzWalter (1730)	Benjamin Mildmay, 1st Earl FitzWalter	1730	1756	
Earl of Effingham (1731)	Francis Howard, 1st Earl of Effingham	1731	1743	Died
Earl of Effingham (1731)	Thomas Howard, 2nd Earl of Effingham	1743	1763	
Earl of Malton (1734)	Thomas Watson-Wentworth, 1st Earl of Malton	1734	1750	Created Marquess of Rockingham, see above
Countess of Yarmouth (1740)	Amalie von Wallmoden, Countess of Yarmouth	1743	1765	New creation
Earl of Orford (1742)	Robert Walpole, 1st Earl of Orford	1742	1745	New creation; died
Earl of Orford (1742)	Robert Walpole, 2nd Earl of Orford	1745	1751	
Earl of Harrington (1742)	William Stanhope, 1st Earl of Harrington	1742	1756	New creation
Earl of Bath (1742)	William Pulteney, 1st Earl of Bath	1742	1764	New creation
Earl of Portsmouth (1743)	John Wallop, 1st Earl of Portsmouth	1743	1762	New creation
Earl of Leicester (1744)	Thomas Coke, 1st Earl of Leicester	1744	1759	New creation
Earl Brooke (1746)	Francis Greville, 1st Earl Brooke	1746	1773	New creation
Earl Clinton (1746)	Hugh Fortescue, 1st Earl Clinton	1746	1751	New creation
Earl Gower (1746)	John Leveson-Gower, 1st Earl Gower	1746	1754	New creation
Earl of Buckinghamshire (1746)	John Hobart, 1st Earl of Buckinghamshire	1746	1756	New creation
Earl Fitzwilliam (1746)	William Fitzwilliam, 1st Earl Fitzwilliam	1746	1756	New creation
Earl of Powis (1748)	Henry Herbert, 1st Earl of Powis	1748	1772	New creation
Earl Temple (1749)	Hester Grenville, 1st Countess Temple	1749	1752	New creation
Earl Harcourt (1749)	Simon Harcourt, 1st Earl Harcourt	1749	1777	New creation

=== Viscounts ===
Title	Holder	Date gained	Date lost	Notes
Peerage of England
Viscount Hereford (1550)	Price Devereux, 9th Viscount Hereford	1700	1740	Died
Viscount Hereford (1550)	Price Devereux, 10th Viscount Hereford	1740	1748	Died
Viscount Hereford (1550)	Edward Devereux, 11th Viscount Hereford	1748	1760	
Viscount Montagu (1554)	Anthony Browne, 6th Viscount Montagu	1717	1767	
Viscount Saye and Sele (1624)	Laurence Fiennes, 5th Viscount Saye and Sele	1710	1742	Died
Viscount Saye and Sele (1624)	Richard Fiennes, 6th Viscount Saye and Sele	1742	1781	
Viscount Fauconberg (1643)	Thomas Belasyse, 4th Viscount Fauconberg	1718	1774	
Viscount Hatton (1682)	William Seton Hatton, 2nd Viscount Hatton	1706	1760	
Viscount Townshend (1682)	Charles Townshend, 3rd Viscount Townshend	1738	1764	
Viscount Weymouth (1682)	Thomas Thynne, 2nd Viscount Weymouth	1714	1751	
Viscount Lonsdale (1690)	Henry Lowther, 3rd Viscount Lonsdale	1713	1751	
Peerage of Scotland
Viscount of Falkland (1620)	Lucius Cary, 7th Viscount Falkland	1730	1785	
Viscount of Stormont (1621)	David Murray, 6th Viscount of Stormont	1731	1748	Died
Viscount of Stormont (1621)	David Murray, 7th Viscount of Stormont	1748	1796	
Viscount of Arbuthnott (1641)	John Arbuthnot, 5th Viscount of Arbuthnott	1710	1756	
Viscount of Irvine (1661)	Henry Ingram, 7th Viscount of Irvine	1736	1761	
Viscount of Strathallan (1686)	William Drummond, 4th Viscount Strathallan	1711	1746	Attainted
Viscount of Garnock (1703)	George Lindsay-Crawford, 4th Viscount of Garnock	1738	1808	Succeeded to the Earldom of Crawford, see above
Viscount of Primrose (1703)	Hugh Primrose, 3rd Viscount of Primrose	1716	1741	Died; Peerage extinct
Peerage of Great Britain
Viscount Bolingbroke (1712)	Henry St John, 1st Viscount Bolingbroke	1712	1751	
Viscount Tadcaster (1714)	Henry O'Brien, 1st Viscount Tadcaster	1714	1741	Died; his heir was attained, so the peerages became forfeit
Viscount St John (1716)	Henry St John, 1st Viscount St John	1716	1742	Died
Viscount St John (1716)	John St John, 2nd Viscount St John	1716	1748	Died
Viscount St John (1716)	Frederick St John, 3rd Viscount St John	1748	1787	
Viscount Cobham (1718)	Richard Temple, 1st Viscount Cobham	1718	1749	Died
Viscount Cobham (1718)	Hester Grenville, 2nd Viscountess Cobham	1749	1752	
Viscount Falmouth (1720)	Hugh Boscawen, 2nd Viscount Falmouth	1734	1782	
Viscount Lymington (1720)	John Wallop, 1st Viscount Lymington	1720	1762	Created Earl of Portsmouth, see above
Viscount Torrington (1721)	Pattee Byng, 2nd Viscount Torrington	1733	1747	Died
Viscount Torrington (1721)	George Byng, 3rd Viscount Torrington	1747	1750	
Viscount Harcourt (1721)	Simon Harcourt, 2nd Viscount Harcourt	1727	1777	Created Earl Harcourt, see above
Viscount Leinster (1747)	James FitzGerald, 1st Viscount Leinster	1747	1773	New creation; Earl of Kildare in the Peerage of Ireland
Viscount Folkestone (1747)	Jacob Bouverie, 1st Viscount Folkestone	1747	1761	New creation

=== Barons ===
Title	Holder	Date gained	Date lost	Notes
Peerage of England
Baron Clinton (1299)	Hugh Fortescue, 14th Baron Clinton	1721	1751	Created Earl Clinton, see above
Baron Ferrers of Chartley (1299)	Elizabeth Compton, 15th Baroness Ferrers of Chartley	1717	1741	Died, barony fell into abeyance
Baron Ferrers of Chartley (1299)	Charlotte Townshend, 16th Baroness Ferrers of Chartley	1749	1770	Abeyance terminated
Baron de Clifford (1299)	Margaret Coke, 19th Baroness de Clifford	1734	1775	
Baron Dacre (1321)	Anne Barrett-Lennard, 16th Baroness Dacre	1741	1755	Abeyance terminated
Baron Dudley (1440)	William Ward, 10th Baron Dudley	1731	1740	Died
Baron Dudley (1440)	Ferdinando Dudley Lea, 11th Baron Dudley	1740	1757	
Baron Stourton (1448)	Thomas Stourton, 14th Baron Stourton	1720	1744	Died
Baron Stourton (1448)	Charles Stourton, 15th Baron Stourton	1744	1753	
Baron Berners (1455)	Katherine Bokenham, 8th Baroness Berners	1711	1743	Died, Barony fell into abeyance
Baron Willoughby de Broke (1491)	Richard Verney, 13th Baron Willoughby de Broke	1728	1752	
Baron Wentworth (1529)	Martha Johnson, 8th Baroness Wentworth	1697	1745	Died
Baron Wentworth (1529)	Edward Noel, 9th Baron Wentworth	1745	1774	
Baron Wharton (1544)	Jane Wharton, 7th Baroness Wharton	1739	1761	
Baron Willoughby of Parham (1547)	Hugh Willoughby, 15th Baron Willoughby of Parham	1715	1765	
Baron North (1554)	Francis North, 7th Baron North	1734	1790	
Baron Hunsdon (1559)	William Ferdinand Carey, 8th Baron Hunsdon	1702	1765	
Baron St John of Bletso (1559)	John St John, 11th Baron St John of Bletso	1722	1757	
Baron De La Warr (1570)	John West, 7th Baron De La Warr	1723	1766	
Baron Petre (1603)	Robert Petre, 8th Baron Petre	1713	1742	Died
Baron Petre (1603)	Robert Petre, 9th Baron Petre	1742	1801	
Baron Arundell of Wardour (1605)	Henry Arundell, 6th Baron Arundell of Wardour	1726	1746	Died
Baron Arundell of Wardour (1605)	Henry Arundell, 7th Baron Arundell of Wardour	1746	1756	
Baron Dormer (1615)	Charles Dormer, 6th Baron Dormer	1728	1761	
Baron Teynham (1616)	Henry Roper, 10th Baron Teynham	1727	1781	
Baron Brooke (1621)	Francis Greville, 8th Baron Brooke	1727	1773	Created Earl Brooke, see above
Baron Craven (1627)	Fulwar Craven, 4th Baron Craven	1739	1764	
Baron Maynard (1628)	Henry Maynard, 4th Baron Maynard	1718	1742	Died
Baron Maynard (1628)	Grey Maynard, 5th Baron Maynard	1742	1745	Died
Baron Maynard (1628)	Charles Maynard, 6th Baron Maynard	1745	1775	
Baron Leigh (1643)	Thomas Leigh, 4th Baron Leigh	1738	1749	Died
Baron Leigh (1643)	Edward Leigh, 5th Baron Leigh	1749	1786	
Baron Byron (1643)	William Byron, 5th Baron Byron	1736	1798	
Baron Ward (1644)	John Ward, 6th Baron Ward	1740	1774	Title previously held by Barons Dudley
Baron Langdale (1658)	Marmaduke Langdale, 4th Baron Langdale	1718	1771	
Baron Berkeley of Stratton (1658)	William Berkeley, 4th Baron Berkeley of Stratton	1697	1741	Died
Baron Berkeley of Stratton (1658)	John Berkeley, 5th Baron Berkeley of Stratton	1741	1773	
Baron Cornwallis (1661)	Charles Cornwallis, 5th Baron Cornwallis	1722	1762	
Baron Arundell of Trerice (1664)	John Arundell, 4th Baron Arundell of Trerice	1706	1768	
Baron Clifford of Chudleigh (1672)	Hugh Clifford, 4th Baron Clifford of Chudleigh	1732	1783	
Baron Willoughby of Parham (1680)	Hugh Willoughby, 15th Baron Willoughby of Parham	1715	1765	
Baron Carteret (1681)	John Carteret, 2nd Baron Carteret	1695	1763	
Baron Stawell (1683)	William Stawell, 3rd Baron Stawell	1692	1742	Died
Baron Stawell (1683)	Edward Stawell, 4th Baron Stawell	1742	1755	
Baron Guilford (1683)	Francis North, 3rd Baron Guilford	1729	1790	
Baron Griffin (1688)	Edward Griffin, 3rd Baron Griffin	1715	1742	Died, title extinct
Baron Haversham (1696)	Maurice Thompson, 2nd Baron Haversham	1710	1745	Died, title extinct
Baron Barnard (1698)	Gilbert Vane, 2nd Baron Barnard	1723	1753	
Baron Gower (1703)	John Leveson-Gower, 2nd Baron Gower	1709	1754	Created Earl Gower, see above
Baron Conway (1703)	Francis Seymour-Conway, 2nd Baron Conway	1732	1794	
Peerage of Scotland
Lord Somerville (1430)	James Somerville, 13th Lord Somerville	1709	1765	
Lord Forbes (1442)	James Forbes, 15th Lord Forbes	1734	1761	
Lord Saltoun (1445)	Alexander Fraser, 13th Lord Saltoun	1715	1748	Died
Lord Saltoun (1445)	Alexander Fraser, 14th Lord Saltoun	1748	1751	
Lord Gray (1445)	John Gray, 11th Lord Gray	1738	1782	
Lord Oliphant (1455)	Francis Oliphant, 10th Lord Oliphant	1721	1748	Died, title extinct
Lord Cathcart (1460)	Charles Cathcart, 8th Lord Cathcart	1732	1740	Died
Lord Cathcart (1460)	Charles Cathcart, 9th Lord Cathcart	1740	1776	
Lord Lovat (1464)	Simon Fraser, 11th Lord Lovat	1699	1746	Peerage forfeited
Lord Sempill (1489)	Hugh Sempill, 12th Lord Sempill	1727	1746	Died
Lord Sempill (1489)	John Sempill, 13th Lord Sempill	1746	1782	
Lord Ross (1499)	George Ross, 13th Lord Ross	1738	1754	
Lord Elphinstone (1509)	Charles Elphinstone, 9th Lord Elphinstone	1718	1757	
Lord Torphichen (1564)	James Sandilands, 7th Lord Torphichen	1696	1753	
Lord Lindores (1600)	Alexander Leslie, 6th Lord Lindores	1719	1765	
Lord Colville of Culross (1604)	John Colville, 6th Lord Colville of Culross	1717	1741	Died
Lord Colville of Culross (1604)	Alexander Colville, 7th Lord Colville of Culross	1741	1770	
Lord Balmerinoch (1606)	John Elphinstone, 5th Lord Balmerino	1736	1746	Died
Lord Balmerinoch (1606)	Arthur Elphinstone, 6th Lord Balmerino	1746	1746	Peerage forfeited
Lord Blantyre (1606)	Robert Stuart, 7th Lord Blantyre	1713	1743	Died
Lord Blantyre (1606)	Walter Stuart, 8th Lord Blantyre	1743	1751	
Lord Cranstoun (1609)	James Cranstoun, 6th Lord Cranstoun	1727	1773	
Lord Aston of Forfar (1627)	Walter Aston, 4th Lord Aston of Forfar	1714	1748	Died
Lord Aston of Forfar (1627)	James Aston, 5th Lord Aston of Forfar	1748	1751	
Lord Fairfax of Cameron (1627)	Thomas Fairfax, 6th Lord Fairfax of Cameron	1710	1781	
Lord Napier (1627)	Francis Napier, 6th Lord Napier	1706	1773	
Lord Reay (1628)	George Mackay, 3rd Lord Reay	1681	1748	Died
Lord Reay (1628)	Donald Mackay, 4th Lord Reay	1748	1761	
Lord Forbes of Pitsligo (1633)	Alexander Forbes, 4th Lord Forbes of Pitsligo	1690	1746	Attainted; Peerage forfeited
Lord Kirkcudbright (1633)	William Maclellan, 7th Lord Kirkcudbright	1730	1762	
Lord Forrester (1633)	George Forrester, 6th Lord Forrester	1727	1748	Died
Lord Forrester (1633)	William Forrester, 7th Lord Forrester	1748	1763	
Lord Banff (1642)	Alexander Ogilvy, 6th Lord Banff	1738	1746	Died
Lord Banff (1642)	Alexander Ogilvy, 7th Lord Banff	1746	1771	
Lord Elibank (1643)	Patrick Murray, 5th Lord Elibank	1736	1778	
Lord Falconer of Halkerton (1646)	David Falconer, 4th Lord Falconer of Halkerton	1724	1751	
Lord Belhaven and Stenton (1647)	John Hamilton, 4th Lord Belhaven and Stenton	1721	1764	
Lord Rollo (1651)	Robert Rollo, 4th Lord Rollo	1700	1758	
Lord Ruthven of Freeland (1650)	Isobel Ruthven, 4th Lady Ruthven of Freeland	1722	1783	
Lord Bellenden (1661)	John Bellenden, 3rd Lord Bellenden	1707	1741	Died
Lord Bellenden (1661)	Ker Bellenden, 4th Lord Bellenden	1741	1753	
Lord Kinnaird (1682)	Charles Kinnaird, 5th Lord Kinnaird	1727	1758	
