= List of peers 1750–1759 =

This page lists all peers who held extant titles between 1750 and 1759.

== Peerage of England, Scotland and Great Britain ==
=== Dukes ===
Title	Holder	Date gained	Date lost	Notes
Peerage of England
Duke of Cornwall (1337)	Frederick, Prince of Wales	1727	1751	Died
Duke of Norfolk (1483)	Edward Howard, 9th Duke of Norfolk	1732	1777	
Duke of Somerset (1547)	Algernon Seymour, 7th Duke of Somerset	1748	1750	Died
Duke of Somerset (1547)	Edward Seymour, 8th Duke of Somerset	1750	1757	Died
Duke of Somerset (1547)	Edward Seymour, 9th Duke of Somerset	1757	1792	
Duke of Cleveland (1670)	William FitzRoy, 3rd Duke of Cleveland	1730	1774	
Duke of Richmond (1675)	Charles Lennox, 2nd Duke of Richmond	1723	1750	Died
Duke of Richmond (1675)	Charles Lennox, 3rd Duke of Richmond	1750	1806	
Duke of Grafton (1675)	Charles FitzRoy, 2nd Duke of Grafton	1690	1757	Died
Duke of Grafton (1675)	Augustus FitzRoy, 3rd Duke of Grafton	1757	1811	
Duke of Beaufort (1682)	Charles Somerset, 4th Duke of Beaufort	1745	1756	Died
Duke of Beaufort (1682)	Henry Somerset, 5th Duke of Beaufort	1756	1803	
Duke of St Albans (1684)	Charles Beauclerk, 2nd Duke of St Albans	1726	1751	Died
Duke of St Albans (1684)	George Beauclerk, 3rd Duke of St Albans	1751	1786	
Duke of Bolton (1689)	Charles Powlett, 3rd Duke of Bolton	1722	1754	Died
Duke of Bolton (1689)	Harry Powlett, 4th Duke of Bolton	1754	1759	Died
Duke of Bolton (1689)	Charles Powlett, 5th Duke of Bolton	1759	1765	
Duke of Leeds (1694)	Thomas Osborne, 4th Duke of Leeds	1731	1789	
Duke of Bedford (1694)	John Russell, 4th Duke of Bedford	1732	1771	
Duke of Devonshire (1694)	William Cavendish, 3rd Duke of Devonshire	1729	1755	Died
Duke of Devonshire (1694)	William Cavendish, 4th Duke of Devonshire	1755	1764	
Duke of Marlborough (1702)	Charles Spencer, 3rd Duke of Marlborough	1733	1758	Died
Duke of Marlborough (1702)	George Spencer, 4th Duke of Marlborough	1758	1817	
Duke of Rutland (1703)	John Manners, 3rd Duke of Rutland	1721	1779	
Peerage of Scotland
Duke of Hamilton (1643)	James Hamilton, 6th Duke of Hamilton	1743	1758	Died
Duke of Hamilton (1643)	James Hamilton, 7th Duke of Hamilton	1758	1769	
Duke of Buccleuch (1663)	Francis Scott, 2nd Duke of Buccleuch	1732	1751	Died
Duke of Buccleuch (1663)	Henry Scott, 3rd Duke of Buccleuch	1751	1812	
Duke of Queensberry (1684)	Charles Douglas, 3rd Duke of Queensberry	1711	1778	
Duke of Gordon (1684)	Cosmo Gordon, 3rd Duke of Gordon	1728	1752	Died
Duke of Gordon (1684)	Alexander Gordon, 4th Duke of Gordon	1752	1827	
Duke of Argyll (1701)	Archibald Campbell, 3rd Duke of Argyll	1743	1761	
Duke of Atholl (1703)	James Murray, 2nd Duke of Atholl	1724	1764	
Duke of Douglas (1703)	Archibald Douglas, 1st Duke of Douglas	1703	1761	
Duke of Montrose (1707)	William Graham, 2nd Duke of Montrose	1742	1790	
Duke of Roxburghe (1707)	Robert Ker, 2nd Duke of Roxburghe	1741	1755	Died
Duke of Roxburghe (1707)	John Ker, 3rd Duke of Roxburghe	1755	1804	
Peerage of Great Britain
Duke of Ancaster and Kesteven (1715)	Peregrine Bertie, 3rd Duke of Ancaster and Kesteven	1742	1778	
Duke of Kingston-upon-Hull (1715)	Evelyn Pierrepont, 2nd Duke of Kingston-upon-Hull	1726	1773	
Duke of Newcastle upon Tyne (1715)	Thomas Pelham-Holles, 1st Duke of Newcastle	1715	1768	Created Newcastle-under-Lyne in 1756
Duke of Portland (1716)	William Bentinck, 2nd Duke of Portland	1726	1762	
Duke of Manchester (1719)	Robert Montagu, 3rd Duke of Manchester	1739	1762	
Duke of Chandos (1719)	Henry Brydges, 2nd Duke of Chandos	1744	1771	
Duke of Dorset (1720)	Lionel Sackville, 1st Duke of Dorset	1720	1765	
Duke of Bridgewater (1720)	Francis Egerton, 3rd Duke of Bridgewater	1748	1803	
Duke of Cumberland (1726)	Prince William, Duke of Cumberland	1726	1765	

=== Marquesses ===
Title	Holder	Date gained	Date lost	Notes
Peerage of England
-
Peerage of Scotland
Marquess of Tweeddale (1694)	John Hay, 4th Marquess of Tweeddale	1715	1762	
Marquess of Lothian (1701)	William Kerr, 3rd Marquess of Lothian	1722	1767	
Marquess of Annandale (1701)	George Vanden-Bempde, 3rd Marquess of Annandale	1730	1792	
Peerage of Great Britain
Marquess Grey (1740)	Jemima Yorke, 2nd Marchioness Grey	1740	1797	
Marquess of Rockingham (1746)	Thomas Watson-Wentworth, 1st Marquess of Rockingham	1746	1750	Died
Marquess of Rockingham (1746)	Charles Watson-Wentworth, 2nd Marquess of Rockingham	1750	1782	

=== Earls ===
Title	Holder	Date gained	Date lost	Notes
Peerage of England
Earl of Shrewsbury (1442)	George Talbot, 14th Earl of Shrewsbury	1743	1787	
Earl of Derby (1485)	Edward Stanley, 11th Earl of Derby	1736	1776	
Earl of Huntingdon (1529)	Francis Hastings, 10th Earl of Huntingdon	1746	1789	
Earl of Pembroke (1551)	Henry Herbert, 10th Earl of Pembroke	1749	1794	
Earl of Devon (1553)	William Courtenay, de jure 7th Earl of Devon	1735	1762	
Earl of Lincoln (1572)	Henry Clinton, 9th Earl of Lincoln	1730	1794	
Earl of Suffolk (1603)	Henry Howard, 11th Earl of Suffolk	1745	1757	Died
Earl of Suffolk (1603)	Henry Howard, 12th Earl of Suffolk	1757	1779	
Earl of Exeter (1605)	Brownlow Cecil, 8th Earl of Exeter	1722	1754	Died
Earl of Exeter (1605)	Brownlow Cecil, 9th Earl of Exeter	1754	1793	
Earl of Salisbury (1605)	James Cecil, 6th Earl of Salisbury	1728	1780	
Earl of Northampton (1618)	James Compton, 5th Earl of Northampton	1727	1754	Died
Earl of Northampton (1618)	George Compton, 6th Earl of Northampton	1754	1758	Died
Earl of Northampton (1618)	Charles Compton, 7th Earl of Northampton	1758	1763	
Earl of Warwick (1618)	Edward Rich, 8th Earl of Warwick	1721	1759	Died, title extinct
Earl of Denbigh (1622)	William Feilding, 5th Earl of Denbigh	1717	1755	Died
Earl of Denbigh (1622)	Basil Feilding, 6th Earl of Denbigh	1755	1800	
Earl of Westmorland (1624)	John Fane, 7th Earl of Westmorland	1736	1762	
Earl of Peterborough (1628)	Charles Mordaunt, 4th Earl of Peterborough	1735	1779	
Earl of Stamford (1628)	Harry Grey, 4th Earl of Stamford	1739	1768	
Earl of Winchilsea (1628)	Daniel Finch, 8th Earl of Winchilsea	1730	1769	
Earl of Chesterfield (1628)	Philip Stanhope, 4th Earl of Chesterfield	1726	1773	
Earl of Thanet (1628)	Sackville Tufton, 7th Earl of Thanet	1729	1753	Died
Earl of Thanet (1628)	Sackville Tufton, 8th Earl of Thanet	1753	1786	
Earl of Sandwich (1660)	John Montagu, 4th Earl of Sandwich	1729	1792	
Earl of Anglesey (1661)	Richard Annesley, 6th Earl of Anglesey	1737	1761	
Earl of Cardigan (1661)	George Brudenell, 4th Earl of Cardigan	1732	1790	
Earl of Clarendon (1661)	Henry Hyde, 4th Earl of Clarendon	1723	1753	Died, title extinct
Earl of Essex (1661)	William Capell, 4th Earl of Essex	1743	1799	
Earl of Carlisle (1661)	Henry Howard, 4th Earl of Carlisle	1738	1758	Died
Earl of Carlisle (1661)	Frederick Howard, 5th Earl of Carlisle	1758	1825	
Earl of Burlington (1664)	Richard Boyle, 3rd Earl of Burlington	1704	1753	Earl of Cork in the Peerage of Ireland; died, title extinct
Earl of Shaftesbury (1672)	Anthony Ashley Cooper, 4th Earl of Shaftesbury	1713	1771	
Earl of Lichfield (1674)	George Lee, 3rd Earl of Lichfield	1742	1772	
Earl of Radnor (1679)	John Robartes, 4th Earl of Radnor	1741	1757	Died, title extinct
Earl of Berkeley (1679)	Augustus Berkeley, 4th Earl of Berkeley	1736	1755	Died
Earl of Berkeley (1679)	Frederick Augustus Berkeley, 5th Earl of Berkeley	1755	1810	
Earl of Abingdon (1682)	Willoughby Bertie, 3rd Earl of Abingdon	1743	1760	
Earl of Gainsborough (1682)	Baptist Noel, 4th Earl of Gainsborough	1714	1751	Died
Earl of Gainsborough (1682)	Baptist Noel, 5th Earl of Gainsborough	1751	1759	Died
Earl of Gainsborough (1682)	Henry Noel, 6th Earl of Gainsborough	1759	1798	
Earl of Plymouth (1682)	Other Windsor, 4th Earl of Plymouth	1732	1771	
Earl of Holderness (1682)	Robert Darcy, 4th Earl of Holderness	1722	1778	
Earl of Stafford (1688)	William Stafford-Howard, 3rd Earl of Stafford	1734	1751	Died
Earl of Stafford (1688)	John Paul Stafford-Howard, 4th Earl of Stafford	1751	1762	
Earl of Warrington (1690)	George Booth, 2nd Earl of Warrington	1694	1758	Died, title extinct
Earl of Scarbrough (1690)	Thomas Lumley-Saunderson, 3rd Earl of Scarbrough	1739	1752	Died
Earl of Scarbrough (1690)	Richard Lumley-Saunderson, 4th Earl of Scarbrough	1752	1782	
Earl of Bradford (1694)	Thomas Newport, 4th Earl of Bradford	1734	1762	
Earl of Rochford (1695)	William Nassau de Zuylestein, 4th Earl of Rochford	1738	1781	
Earl of Albemarle (1697)	Willem van Keppel, 2nd Earl of Albemarle	1718	1754	Died
Earl of Albemarle (1697)	George Keppel, 3rd Earl of Albemarle	1754	1772	
Earl of Coventry (1697)	William Coventry, 5th Earl of Coventry	1719	1751	Died
Earl of Coventry (1697)	George Coventry, 6th Earl of Coventry	1751	1809	
Earl of Jersey (1697)	William Villiers, 3rd Earl of Jersey	1721	1769	
Earl of Grantham (1698)	Henry de Nassau d'Auverquerque, 1st Earl of Grantham	1698	1754	Died, title extinct
Earl Poulett (1706)	John Poulett, 2nd Earl Poulett	1743	1764	
Earl of Godolphin (1706)	Francis Godolphin, 2nd Earl of Godolphin	1712	1766	
Earl of Cholmondeley (1706)	George Cholmondeley, 3rd Earl of Cholmondeley	1733	1770	
Peerage of Scotland
Earl of Crawford (1398)	George Lindsay-Crawford, 21st Earl of Crawford	1749	1781	
Earl of Erroll (1452)	Mary Hay, 14th Countess of Erroll	1717	1758	Died
Earl of Erroll (1452)	James Hay, 15th Earl of Erroll	1758	1778	
Earl of Sutherland (1235)	William Sutherland, 17th Earl of Sutherland	1733	1750	Died
Earl of Sutherland (1235)	William Sutherland, 18th Earl of Sutherland	1750	1766	
Earl of Rothes (1458)	John Leslie, 10th Earl of Rothes	1722	1767	
Earl of Morton (1458)	James Douglas, 14th Earl of Morton	1738	1768	
Earl of Glencairn (1488)	William Cunningham, 13th Earl of Glencairn	1734	1775	
Earl of Eglinton (1507)	Alexander Montgomerie, 10th Earl of Eglinton	1729	1769	
Earl of Cassilis (1509)	John Kennedy, 8th Earl of Cassilis	1701	1759	Died
Earl of Cassilis (1509)	Thomas Kennedy, 9th Earl of Cassilis	1759	1775	
Earl of Caithness (1455)	Alexander Sinclair, 9th Earl of Caithness	1705	1765	
Earl of Buchan (1469)	Henry Erskine, 10th Earl of Buchan	1745	1767	
Earl of Moray (1562)	James Stuart, 8th Earl of Moray	1739	1767	
Earl of Home (1605)	William Home, 8th Earl of Home	1720	1761	
Earl of Abercorn (1606)	James Hamilton, 8th Earl of Abercorn	1744	1789	
Earl of Strathmore and Kinghorne (1606)	Thomas Lyon, 8th Earl of Strathmore and Kinghorne	1735	1753	Died
Earl of Strathmore and Kinghorne (1606)	John Bowes, 9th Earl of Strathmore and Kinghorne	1753	1776	
Earl of Kellie (1619)	Alexander Erskine, 5th Earl of Kellie	1710	1758	Died
Earl of Kellie (1619)	Thomas Erskine, 6th Earl of Kellie	1758	1781	
Earl of Haddington (1619)	Thomas Hamilton, 7th Earl of Haddington	1735	1794	
Earl of Galloway (1623)	Alexander Stewart, 6th Earl of Galloway	1746	1773	
Earl of Lauderdale (1624)	James Maitland, 7th Earl of Lauderdale	1744	1789	
Earl of Loudoun (1633)	John Campbell, 4th Earl of Loudoun	1731	1782	
Earl of Kinnoull (1633)	George Hay, 8th Earl of Kinnoull	1709	1758	Died
Earl of Kinnoull (1633)	Thomas Hay, 9th Earl of Kinnoull	1758	1787	
Earl of Dumfries (1633)	William Dalrymple-Crichton, 5th Earl of Dumfries	1742	1769	
Earl of Elgin (1633)	Charles Bruce, 5th Earl of Elgin	1747	1771	
Earl of Traquair (1633)	Charles Stewart, 5th Earl of Traquair	1741	1764	
Earl of Wemyss (1633)	James Wemyss, 5th Earl of Wemyss	1720	1756	Died; heir to the peerage was under attainder
Earl of Dalhousie (1633)	Charles Ramsay, 7th Earl of Dalhousie	1739	1764	
Earl of Findlater (1638)	James Ogilvy, 5th Earl of Findlater	1730	1764	
Earl of Leven (1641)	Alexander Leslie, 5th Earl of Leven	1728	1754	Died
Earl of Leven (1641)	David Leslie, 6th Earl of Leven	1754	1802	
Earl of Dysart (1643)	Lionel Tollemache, 4th Earl of Dysart	1727	1770	
Earl of Selkirk (1646)	Dunbar Douglas, 4th Earl of Selkirk	1744	1799	
Earl of Northesk (1647)	George Carnegie, 6th Earl of Northesk	1741	1792	
Earl of Balcarres (1651)	James Lindsay, 5th Earl of Balcarres	1736	1768	
Earl of Aboyne (1660)	Charles Gordon, 4th Earl of Aboyne	1732	1794	
Earl of Newburgh (1660)	Charles Livingston, 2nd Earl of Newburgh	1670	1755	Died
Earl of Newburgh (1660)	James Radclyffe, 4th Earl of Newburgh	1755	1786	
Earl of Dundonald (1669)	William Cochrane, 7th Earl of Dundonald	1737	1758	Died
Earl of Dundonald (1669)	Thomas Cochrane, 8th Earl of Dundonald	1758	1778	
Earl of Kintore (1677)	John Keith, 3rd Earl of Kintore	1718	1758	Died
Earl of Kintore (1677)	William Keith, 4th Earl of Kintore	1758	1761	
Earl of Breadalbane and Holland (1677)	John Campbell, 2nd Earl of Breadalbane and Holland	1717	1752	Died
Earl of Breadalbane and Holland (1677)	John Campbell, 3rd Earl of Breadalbane and Holland	1752	1782	
Earl of Aberdeen (1682)	George Gordon, 3rd Earl of Aberdeen	1746	1801	
Earl of Dunmore (1686)	John Murray, 2nd Earl of Dunmore	1710	1752	Died
Earl of Dunmore (1686)	William Murray, 3rd Earl of Dunmore	1752	1756	Died
Earl of Dunmore (1686)	John Murray, 4th Earl of Dunmore	1752	1809	
Earl of Orkney (1696)	Anne O'Brien, 2nd Countess of Orkney	1737	1756	Died
Earl of Orkney (1696)	Mary O'Brien, 3rd Countess of Orkney	1756	1790	
Earl of March (1697)	William Douglas, 3rd Earl of March	1731	1810	
Earl of Marchmont (1697)	Hugh Hume-Campbell, 3rd Earl of Marchmont	1740	1794	
Earl of Hyndford (1701)	John Carmichael, 3rd Earl of Hyndford	1737	1766	
Earl of Stair (1703)	James Dalrymple, 3rd Earl of Stair	1747	1760	
Earl of Rosebery (1703)	James Primrose, 2nd Earl of Rosebery	1723	1765	
Earl of Glasgow (1703)	John Boyle, 3rd Earl of Glasgow	1740	1775	
Earl of Portmore (1703)	Charles Colyear, 2nd Earl of Portmore	1730	1785	
Earl of Bute (1703)	John Stuart, 3rd Earl of Bute	1723	1792	
Earl of Hopetoun (1703)	John Hope, 2nd Earl of Hopetoun	1742	1781	
Earl of Deloraine (1706)	Henry Scott, 4th Earl of Deloraine	1740	1807	
Peerage of Great Britain
Earl of Oxford and Mortimer (1711)	Edward Harley, 3rd Earl of Oxford and Earl Mortimer	1741	1755	Died
Earl of Oxford and Mortimer (1711)	Edward Harley, 4th Earl of Oxford and Earl Mortimer	1755	1790	
Earl of Strafford (1711)	William Wentworth, 2nd Earl of Strafford	1739	1791	
Earl Ferrers (1711)	Laurence Shirley, 4th Earl Ferrers	1745	1760	
Earl of Dartmouth (1711)	William Legge, 1st Earl of Dartmouth	1711	1750	Died
Earl of Dartmouth (1711)	William Legge, 2nd Earl of Dartmouth	1750	1801	
Earl of Tankerville (1714)	Charles Bennet, 2nd Earl of Tankerville	1722	1753	Died
Earl of Tankerville (1714)	Charles Bennet, 3rd Earl of Tankerville	1753	1767	
Earl of Aylesford (1714)	Heneage Finch, 2nd Earl of Aylesford	1740	1757	Died
Earl of Aylesford (1714)	Heneage Finch, 3rd Earl of Aylesford	1757	1777	
Earl of Bristol (1714)	John Hervey, 1st Earl of Bristol	1714	1751	Died
Earl of Bristol (1714)	George Hervey, 2nd Earl of Bristol	1751	1775	
Earl of Uxbridge (1714)	Henry Paget, 2nd Earl of Uxbridge	1743	1769	
Earl Granville (1715)	John Carteret, 2nd Earl Granville	1744	1763	
Earl of Halifax (1715)	George Montagu-Dunk, 2nd Earl of Halifax	1739	1771	
Earl of Sussex (1717)	George Yelverton, 2nd Earl of Sussex	1731	1758	Died
Earl of Sussex (1717)	Henry Yelverton, 3rd Earl of Sussex	1758	1799	
Earl Cowper (1718)	William Clavering-Cowper, 2nd Earl Cowper	1723	1764	
Earl Stanhope (1718)	Philip Stanhope, 2nd Earl Stanhope	1721	1786	
Earl Coningsby (1719)	Margaret Newton, 2nd Countess Coningsby	1729	1761	
Earl of Harborough (1719)	Philip Sherard, 2nd Earl of Harborough	1732	1750	Died
Earl of Harborough (1719)	Bennet Sherard, 3rd Earl of Harborough	1750	1770	
Earl of Macclesfield (1721)	George Parker, 2nd Earl of Macclesfield	1732	1764	
Earl of Pomfret (1721)	Thomas Fermor, 1st Earl of Pomfret	1721	1753	Died
Earl of Pomfret (1721)	George Fermor, 2nd Earl of Pomfret	1753	1785	
Countess of Walsingham (1722)	Melusina von der Schulenburg, Countess of Walsingham	1722	1778	
Earl Waldegrave (1729)	James Waldegrave, 2nd Earl Waldegrave	1741	1763	
Earl of Ashburnham (1730)	John Ashburnham, 2nd Earl of Ashburnham	1737	1812	
Earl FitzWalter (1730)	Benjamin Mildmay, 1st Earl FitzWalter	1730	1756	Died; Peerage extinct
Earl of Effingham (1731)	Thomas Howard, 2nd Earl of Effingham	1743	1763	
Countess of Yarmouth (1740)	Amalie von Wallmoden, Countess of Yarmouth	1743	1765	
Earl of Orford (1742)	Robert Walpole, 2nd Earl of Orford	1745	1751	Died
Earl of Orford (1742)	George Walpole, 3rd Earl of Orford	1751	1791	
Earl of Harrington (1742)	William Stanhope, 1st Earl of Harrington	1742	1756	Died
Earl of Harrington (1742)	William Stanhope, 2nd Earl of Harrington	1756	1779	
Earl of Bath (1742)	William Pulteney, 1st Earl of Bath	1742	1764	
Earl of Portsmouth (1743)	John Wallop, 1st Earl of Portsmouth	1743	1762	
Earl of Leicester (1744)	Thomas Coke, 1st Earl of Leicester	1744	1759	Died; Peerage extinct
Earl Brooke (1746)	Francis Greville, 1st Earl Brooke	1746	1773	Created Earl of Warwick in 1759
Earl Clinton (1746)	Hugh Fortescue, 1st Earl Clinton	1746	1751	Died; Peerage extinct
Earl Gower (1746)	John Leveson-Gower, 1st Earl Gower	1746	1754	Died
Earl Gower (1746)	Granville Leveson-Gower, 2nd Earl Gower	1754	1803	
Earl of Buckinghamshire (1746)	John Hobart, 1st Earl of Buckinghamshire	1746	1756	Died
Earl of Buckinghamshire (1746)	John Hobart, 2nd Earl of Buckinghamshire	1756	1793	
Earl Fitzwilliam (1746)	William Fitzwilliam, 1st Earl Fitzwilliam	1746	1756	Died
Earl Fitzwilliam (1746)	William Fitzwilliam, 2nd Earl Fitzwilliam	1756	1833	
Earl of Powis (1748)	Henry Herbert, 1st Earl of Powis	1748	1772	
Earl of Northumberland (1749)	Hugh Percy, 2nd Earl of Northumberland	1750	1786	Peerage previously held by the Duke of Somerset
Earl of Egremont (1748)	Charles Wyndham, 2nd Earl of Egremont	1750	1763	Peerage previously held by the Duke of Somerset
Earl Temple (1749)	Hester Grenville, 1st Countess Temple	1749	1752	Died
Earl Temple (1749)	Richard Grenville-Temple, 2nd Earl Temple	1752	1779	
Earl Harcourt (1749)	Simon Harcourt, 1st Earl Harcourt	1749	1777	
Earl of Hertford (1750)	Francis Seymour-Conway, 1st Earl of Hertford	1750	1794	New creation
Earl of Guilford (1752)	Francis North, 1st Earl of Guilford	1752	1790	New creation
Earl Cornwallis (1753)	Charles Cornwallis, 1st Earl Cornwallis	1753	1762	New creation
Earl of Hardwicke (1754)	Philip Yorke, 1st Earl of Hardwicke	1753	1764	New creation
Earl of Darlington (1754)	Henry Vane, 1st Earl of Darlington	1754	1758	New creation; died
Earl of Darlington (1754)	Henry Vane, 2nd Earl of Darlington	1758	1792	
Earl Fauconberg (1756)	Thomas Belasyse, 1st Earl Fauconberg	1756	1774	New creation
Earl of Ilchester (1756)	Stephen Fox-Strangways, 1st Earl of Ilchester	1756	1776	New creation

=== Viscounts ===
Title	Holder	Date gained	Date lost	Notes
Peerage of England
Viscount Hereford (1550)	Edward Devereux, 11th Viscount Hereford	1748	1760	
Viscount Montagu (1554)	Anthony Browne, 6th Viscount Montagu	1717	1767	
Viscount Saye and Sele (1624)	Richard Fiennes, 6th Viscount Saye and Sele	1742	1781	
Viscount Fauconberg (1643)	Thomas Belasyse, 4th Viscount Fauconberg	1718	1774	Created Earl Fauconberg, see above
Viscount Hatton (1682)	William Seton Hatton, 2nd Viscount Hatton	1706	1760	
Viscount Townshend (1682)	Charles Townshend, 3rd Viscount Townshend	1738	1764	
Viscount Weymouth (1682)	Thomas Thynne, 2nd Viscount Weymouth	1714	1751	Died
Viscount Weymouth (1682)	Thomas Thynne, 3rd Viscount Weymouth	1751	1796	
Viscount Lonsdale (1690)	Henry Lowther, 3rd Viscount Lonsdale	1713	1751	Died, title extinct
Peerage of Scotland
Viscount of Falkland (1620)	Lucius Cary, 7th Viscount Falkland	1730	1785	
Viscount of Stormont (1621)	David Murray, 7th Viscount of Stormont	1748	1796	
Viscount of Arbuthnott (1641)	John Arbuthnot, 5th Viscount of Arbuthnott	1710	1756	Died
Viscount of Arbuthnott (1641)	John Arbuthnot, 6th Viscount of Arbuthnott	1756	1791	
Viscount of Irvine (1661)	Henry Ingram, 7th Viscount of Irvine	1736	1761	
Peerage of Great Britain
Viscount Bolingbroke (1712)	Henry St John, 1st Viscount Bolingbroke	1712	1751	Died
Viscount Bolingbroke (1712)	Frederick St John, 2nd Viscount Bolingbroke	1751	1787	
Viscount St John (1716)	Frederick St John, 3rd Viscount St John	1748	1787	Inherited the senior Viscountcy of Bolingbroke in 1751
Viscount Cobham (1718)	Hester Grenville, 2nd Viscountess Cobham	1749	1752	Created Countess Temple, see above
Viscount Falmouth (1720)	Hugh Boscawen, 2nd Viscount Falmouth	1734	1782	
Viscount Torrington (1721)	George Byng, 3rd Viscount Torrington	1747	1750	Died
Viscount Torrington (1721)	George Byng, 4th Viscount Torrington	1750	1812	
Viscount Leinster (1747)	James FitzGerald, 1st Viscount Leinster	1747	1773	Earl of Kildare in the Peerage of Ireland
Viscount Folkestone (1747)	Jacob Bouverie, 1st Viscount Folkestone	1747	1761	

=== Barons ===
Title	Holder	Date gained	Date lost	Notes
Peerage of England
Baron Ferrers of Chartley (1299)	Charlotte Townshend, 16th Baroness Ferrers of Chartley	1749	1770	
Baron de Clifford (1299)	Margaret Coke, 19th Baroness de Clifford	1734	1775	
Baron Dacre (1321)	Anne Barrett-Lennard, 16th Baroness Dacre	1741	1755	Died
Baron Dacre (1321)	Thomas Barrett-Lennard, 17th Baron Dacre	1755	1786	
Baron Dudley (1440)	Ferdinando Dudley Lea, 11th Baron Dudley	1740	1757	Died, Barony fell into abeyance
Baron Stourton (1448)	Charles Stourton, 15th Baron Stourton	1744	1753	Died
Baron Stourton (1448)	William Stourton, 16th Baron Stourton	1753	1781	
Baron Willoughby de Broke (1491)	Richard Verney, 13th Baron Willoughby de Broke	1728	1752	Died
Baron Willoughby de Broke (1491)	John Peyto-Verney, 14th Baron Willoughby de Broke	1752	1816	
Baron Wentworth (1529)	Edward Noel, 9th Baron Wentworth	1745	1774	
Baron Wharton (1544)	Jane Wharton, 7th Baroness Wharton	1739	1761	
Baron Willoughby of Parham (1547)	Hugh Willoughby, 15th Baron Willoughby of Parham	1715	1765	
Baron North (1554)	Francis North, 7th Baron North	1734	1790	Created Earl of Guilford, see above
Baron Hunsdon (1559)	William Ferdinand Carey, 8th Baron Hunsdon	1702	1765	
Baron St John of Bletso (1559)	John St John, 11th Baron St John of Bletso	1722	1757	Died
Baron St John of Bletso (1559)	John St John, 12th Baron St John of Bletso	1757	1767	
Baron De La Warr (1570)	John West, 7th Baron De La Warr	1723	1766	
Baron Petre (1603)	Robert Petre, 9th Baron Petre	1742	1801	
Baron Arundell of Wardour (1605)	Henry Arundell, 7th Baron Arundell of Wardour	1746	1756	Died
Baron Arundell of Wardour (1605)	Henry Arundell, 8th Baron Arundell of Wardour	1756	1808	
Baron Dormer (1615)	Charles Dormer, 6th Baron Dormer	1728	1761	
Baron Teynham (1616)	Henry Roper, 10th Baron Teynham	1727	1781	
Baron Craven (1627)	Fulwar Craven, 4th Baron Craven	1739	1764	
Baron Clifford (1628)	Charlotte Cavendish, 6th Baroness Clifford	1753	1754	Title previously held by the Earls of Burlington; died
Baron Clifford (1628)	William Cavendish, 7th Baron Clifford	1754	1811	
Baron Maynard (1628)	Charles Maynard, 6th Baron Maynard	1745	1775	
Baron Leigh (1643)	Edward Leigh, 5th Baron Leigh	1749	1786	
Baron Byron (1643)	William Byron, 5th Baron Byron	1736	1798	
Baron Ward (1644)	John Ward, 6th Baron Ward	1740	1774	
Baron Langdale (1658)	Marmaduke Langdale, 4th Baron Langdale	1718	1771	
Baron Berkeley of Stratton (1658)	John Berkeley, 5th Baron Berkeley of Stratton	1741	1773	
Baron Cornwallis (1661)	Charles Cornwallis, 5th Baron Cornwallis	1722	1762	Created Earl Cornwallis, see above
Baron Delamer (1661)	Nathaniel Booth, 4th Baron Delamer	1758	1770	Title previously held by the Earls of Warrington
Baron Arundell of Trerice (1664)	John Arundell, 4th Baron Arundell of Trerice	1706	1768	
Baron Clifford of Chudleigh (1672)	Hugh Clifford, 4th Baron Clifford of Chudleigh	1732	1783	
Baron Willoughby of Parham (1680)	Hugh Willoughby, 15th Baron Willoughby of Parham	1715	1765	
Baron Stawell (1683)	Edward Stawell, 4th Baron Stawell	1742	1755	Died, title extinct
Baron Guilford (1683)	Francis North, 3rd Baron Guilford	1729	1790	Created Earl of Guilford, see above
Baron Barnard (1698)	Gilbert Vane, 2nd Baron Barnard	1723	1753	
Baron Barnard (1698)	Henry Vane, 3rd Baron Barnard	1753	1758	Created Earl of Darlington, see above
Baron Conway (1703)	Francis Seymour-Conway, 2nd Baron Conway	1732	1794	Created Earl of Hertford, see above
Peerage of Scotland
Lord Somerville (1430)	James Somerville, 13th Lord Somerville	1709	1765	
Lord Forbes (1442)	James Forbes, 15th Lord Forbes	1734	1761	
Lord Saltoun (1445)	Alexander Fraser, 14th Lord Saltoun	1748	1751	Died
Lord Saltoun (1445)	George Fraser, 15th Lord Saltoun	1748	1781	
Lord Gray (1445)	John Gray, 11th Lord Gray	1738	1782	
Lord Cathcart (1460)	Charles Cathcart, 9th Lord Cathcart	1740	1776	
Lord Sempill (1489)	John Sempill, 13th Lord Sempill	1746	1782	
Lord Ross (1499)	George Ross, 13th Lord Ross	1738	1754	Died
Lord Ross (1499)	William Ross, 14th Lord Ross	1754	1754	Died, peerage extinct
Lord Elphinstone (1509)	Charles Elphinstone, 9th Lord Elphinstone	1718	1757	Died
Lord Elphinstone (1509)	Charles Elphinstone, 10th Lord Elphinstone	1757	1781	
Lord Torphichen (1564)	James Sandilands, 7th Lord Torphichen	1696	1753	Died
Lord Torphichen (1564)	Walter Sandilands, 8th Lord Torphichen	1753	1765	
Lord Lindores (1600)	Alexander Leslie, 6th Lord Lindores	1719	1765	
Lord Colville of Culross (1604)	Alexander Colville, 7th Lord Colville of Culross	1741	1770	
Lord Blantyre (1606)	Walter Stuart, 8th Lord Blantyre	1743	1751	Died
Lord Blantyre (1606)	William Stuart, 9th Lord Blantyre	1751	1776	
Lord Cranstoun (1609)	James Cranstoun, 6th Lord Cranstoun	1727	1773	
Lord Aston of Forfar (1627)	James Aston, 5th Lord Aston of Forfar	1748	1751	Died
Lord Aston of Forfar (1627)	Philip Aston, 6th Lord Aston of Forfar	1751	1755	Died
Lord Aston of Forfar (1627)	Walter Aston, 7th Lord Aston of Forfar	1755	1763	
Lord Fairfax of Cameron (1627)	Thomas Fairfax, 6th Lord Fairfax of Cameron	1710	1781	
Lord Napier (1627)	Francis Napier, 6th Lord Napier	1706	1773	
Lord Reay (1628)	Donald Mackay, 4th Lord Reay	1748	1761	
Lord Kirkcudbright (1633)	William Maclellan, 7th Lord Kirkcudbright	1730	1762	
Lord Forrester (1633)	William Forrester, 7th Lord Forrester	1748	1763	
Lord Banff (1642)	Alexander Ogilvy, 7th Lord Banff	1746	1771	
Lord Elibank (1643)	Patrick Murray, 5th Lord Elibank	1736	1778	
Lord Falconer of Halkerton (1646)	David Falconer, 4th Lord Falconer of Halkerton	1724	1751	Died
Lord Falconer of Halkerton (1646)	Alexander Falconer, 5th Lord Falconer of Halkerton	1751	1762	
Lord Belhaven and Stenton (1647)	John Hamilton, 4th Lord Belhaven and Stenton	1721	1764	
Lord Rollo (1651)	Robert Rollo, 4th Lord Rollo	1700	1758	Died
Lord Rollo (1651)	Andrew Rollo, 5th Lord Rollo	1758	1763	
Lord Ruthven of Freeland (1650)	Isobel Ruthven, 4th Lady Ruthven of Freeland	1722	1783	
Lord Bellenden (1661)	Ker Bellenden, 4th Lord Bellenden	1741	1753	Died
Lord Bellenden (1661)	John Ker Bellenden, 5th Lord Bellenden	1753	1796	
Lord Kinnaird (1682)	Charles Kinnaird, 5th Lord Kinnaird	1727	1758	Died
Lord Kinnaird (1682)	Charles Kinnaird, 6th Lord Kinnaird	1758	1767	
