= Edward Ward, 9th Baron Dudley =

English noble (1704–1731)

Edward Ward, 9th Baron Dudley and 4th Baron Ward (16 June 1704 – 6 September 1731) succeeded to the titles of Baron Dudley and Baron Ward at his birth in 1704, his father having died during the period of his mother's pregnancy. He died unmarried in 1731, when the titles were passed on to his uncle, William Ward.

== Life ==
Edward Ward, 9th Baron Dudley and 4th Baron Ward was the only son of Edward Ward, 8th Baron Dudley and 3rd Baron Ward and his wife Diana daughter and heiress of Thomas Howard of Ashtead, Surrey. He was born posthumously, and so succeeded to his father's baronies at birth.

In 1712, during his minority, one of the first Newcomen steam engines was erected within his Coneygree Park, in Tipton west of Dudley Castle, so as to drain coal mines there. This was illustrated in a contemporary engraving by Thomas Barney, also showing the castle, so that the engine is sometimes referred to as the Dudley Castle engine. Another engine was subsequently erected for his Park colliery.

Edward Ward died a bachelor in 1731. His titles were inherited by William Ward, 10th Baron Dudley, 5th Baron Ward (died 1740), on whose death the estates and titles were divided. The entailed estate and the title Baron Ward passed to his heir male, a cousin William Ward (later 1st Viscount Dudley and Ward), whereas the title Baron Dudley and certain estates more recently purchased (and thus not entailed) passed to Ferdinando Dudley Lea, 11th Baron Dudley, the son of a sister of the 10th Baron. This led to a dispute over the ownership of a steam engine standing on the entailed property, ultimately resolved in favour of Lord Dudley, who therefore removed the engine to his own property at Russell's Hall, Dudley.

Peerage of England
Preceded by Edward Ward	Baron Dudley; 1704–1731	Succeeded by William Ward
Preceded by Edward Ward	Baron Ward; 1704–1731	Succeeded by William Ward
