= Edward Ward, 8th Baron Dudley =

Edward Ward, 8th Baron Dudley and 3rd Baron Ward (1683-1704) succeeded his grandfather, Edward Ward, 7th Baron Dudley in the Baronies of Dudley and Ward in 1701. He married Diana Howard, the daughter of Thomas Howard, Teller of the Exchequer. He died of smallpox in 1704 and was buried at Himley. He was succeeded by his son Edward.

== Life ==
Edward Ward was born in 1683 to William Ward, the third son of Edward Ward, Baron Dudley and Ward, and Frances Dilke of Maxstoke Castle. He was baptized on 20 December 1683. William had been the heir apparent of the two baronies but had predeceased his father, dying in 1692. Edward was educated at Rugby School, entering on 11 July 1695.

Edward married Diana Howard, the daughter of Thomas Howard, Teller of the Exchequer on 9 April 1703. He died of smallpox in Whitehall on 28 March 1704 and was buried at Himley. He was succeeded in the baronies by his son, also called Edward, who was born after his father's death.

Peerage of England
| Preceded by Edward Ward | Baron Dudley; 1701–1704 | Succeeded by Edward Ward |
| Preceded by Edward Ward | Baron Ward; 1701–1704 | Succeeded by Edward Ward |
