= William Ward, 10th Baron Dudley =

William Ward, 10th Baron Dudley and 5th Baron Ward (1685-1740) succeeded his nephew, Edward Ward, 9th Baron Dudley in the Baronies of Dudley and Ward in 1731. On his death the two baronies separated, the Barony of Dudley descending to his nephew, Ferdinando Dudley Lea whilst the Barony of Ward, together with Dudley Castle, were inherited by John Ward

== Life ==
William Ward, born on 16 October 1685, was the youngest son of the Hon. William Ward and Frances Dilke of Maxstoke Castle. He was the brother of Edward Ward, 8th Baron Dudley.

William Ward became 10th Baron Dudley and 5th Baron Ward on the death of his nephew Edward Ward, 9th Baron Dudley, in 1731.

William died unmarried in 1740, when the baronies became separated, the Barony of Dudley descending on the heir general, Ferdinando Dudley Lea, and the Barony of Ward, together with Dudley Castle, descending on the heir male, John Ward.

Peerage of England
Preceded by Edward Ward, 9th Baron Dudley	Baron Dudley; 1731–1740	Succeeded by Ferdinando Dudley Lea
Preceded by Edward Ward, 9th Baron Dudley	Baron Ward; 1731–1740	Succeeded by John Ward
