= Earl of Dudley =

Title in the Peerage of the United Kingdom

Earldom of Dudley
- Arms of Ward: Chequy or and azure, a bend ermine; Crest: Out of a ducal coronet or a lion's head azure; Supporters: On either side an angel proper crined and winged or under-robes sanguine outer-robes azure
- Creation date: 17 February 1860
- Creation: Second
- Created by: Queen Victoria
- Peerage: Peerage of the United Kingdom
- First holder: William Ward, 1st Earl of Dudley
- Present holder: Leander Ward, 6th Earl of Dudley
- Heir presumptive: Alexander Evelyn Giles Ward
- Remainder to: First earl's heirs male of the body, lawfully begotten
- Subsidiary titles: Viscount Ednam; Baron Ward
- Former seats: Dudley House; Witley Court; Himley Hall
- Motto: COMME JE FÛS ("As I was")

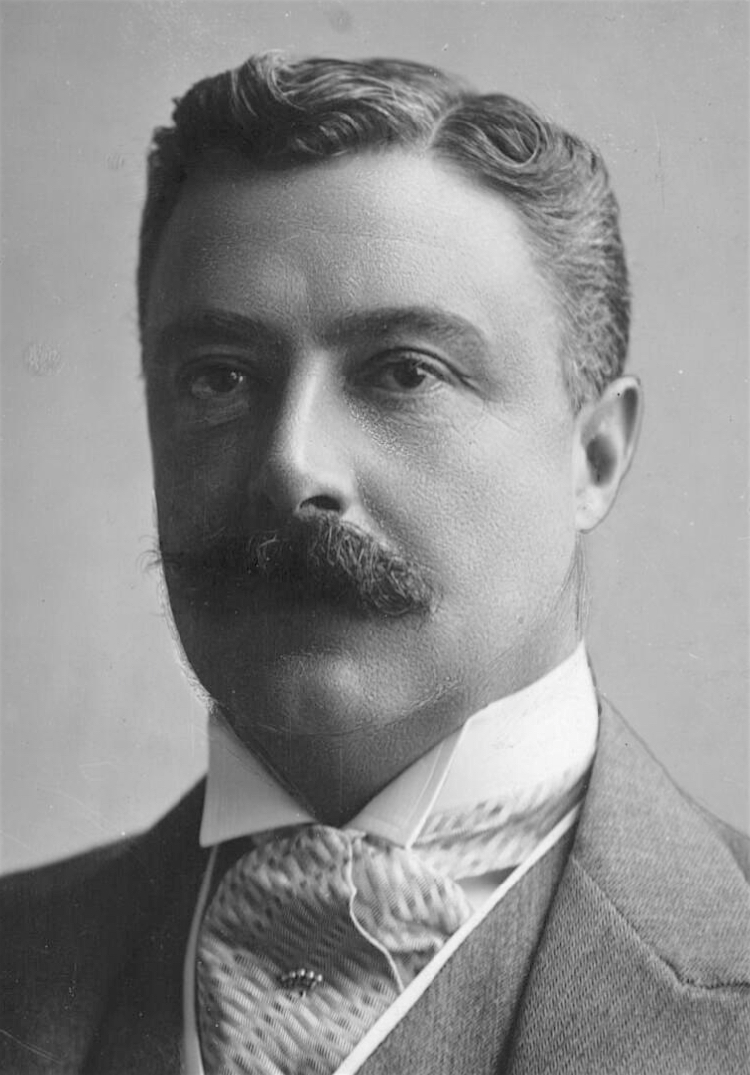
William Ward, 2nd Earl of Dudley

Earl of Dudley, of Dudley Castle in the County of Stafford, is a title that has been created twice in the Peerage of the United Kingdom, both times for members of the Ward family.

== History ==
Dudley was first used for a peerage on 25 March 1341/42, when John Sutton became the first Lord Dudley of Dudley Castle. The male line failed at the 10th Baron, Sir Ferdinando Dudley, and Dudley Castle passed to his daughter, Frances Dudley, Baroness Dudley (1611–1697). She married Sir Humble Ward, the son of a wealthy goldsmith and jeweller to King Charles I (see Baron Dudley for more history of the Sutton family). Frances was given away in marriage by her grandfather Lord Dudley in order for him to be able to redeem the heavily mortgaged estates around Dudley, whose mineral resources were the foundation of the family's great wealth.

In 1644, Frances's husband Sir Humble Ward was raised to the Peerage of England in his own right as Baron Ward, of Birmingham in the County of Warwick. In contrast to the barony of Dudley, which had been created by writ, this peerage was created by letters patent and with remainder to heirs male. Lady Dudley and Lord Ward were both succeeded by their son Edward, the seventh and second Baron, respectively. He was styled Lord Dudley and Ward. He was succeeded by his grandson, the eighth and third Baron. He was the son of William Ward. On Lord Dudley and Ward's early death the titles passed to his posthumous son, the ninth and fourth Baron. He died unmarried at an early age and was succeeded by his uncle, the 10th and fifth Baron.

On his death in 1740, the two baronies separated. The barony of Dudley, which could pass through female lines, was inherited by the late Baron's nephew Ferdinando Dudley Lea (see the Baron Dudley for later history of this title). He was succeeded in the barony of Ward, which could only pass through male lines, by his second cousin John Ward, who became the sixth Baron Ward. He was the grandson of William Ward (d. 1714), second son of the first Baron. Lord Ward had earlier represented Newcastle-under-Lyme in the House of Commons. In 1763 he was created Viscount Dudley and Ward, of Dudley in the County of Worcester, in the Peerage of Great Britain. He was succeeded by his son from his first marriage, the second Viscount. He sat as Member of Parliament for Marlborough and for Worcestershire. He was childless and on his death the titles passed to his half-brother, the third Viscount. He was also Member of Parliament for Worcestershire. He was succeeded by his son, the fourth Viscount. He was a politician and served as Foreign Secretary from 1827 to 1828. In 1827 he was honoured when he was created Viscount Ednam, of Ednam in the County of Roxburgh, and Earl of Dudley, of Dudley Castle in the County of Stafford. Both titles were in the Peerage of the United Kingdom.

Lord Dudley was childless and on his death in 1833, the two viscountcies and earldom became extinct. He was succeeded in the barony of Ward by his second cousin Reverend William Humble Ward, the 10th Baron. He was the grandson of Reverend William Ward, younger brother of the first Viscount Dudley and Ward. He was succeeded by his eldest son, the 11th Baron.

In 1860, the viscountcy of Ednam and earldom of Dudley were revived when the 11th baron was created Viscount Ednam, of Ednam in the County of Roxburgh, and Earl of Dudley, of Dudley Castle in the County of Stafford. Both titles are in the Peerage of the United Kingdom. On his death the titles passed to his eldest son, the second Earl. He was a Conservative politician and served as Lord-Lieutenant of Ireland from 1902 to 1905 during the Irish Reform Association's plan for devolution in Ireland, and as Governor-General of Australia from 1908 to 1911. He is commemorated by a Dudley Street in the Queen's Quarter of Belfast. He was succeeded by his eldest son, the third Earl of Dudley, who represented Hornsey and Wednesbury in the House of Commons as a Conservative. The Third Earl died in Paris on 26 December 1969. As of 2026 the titles are held by his grandson, the sixth Earl, who succeeded his half-brother in 2026.

Several other members of the Ward family have also gained distinction. William Dudley Ward, grandson of Humble Dudley Ward, second son of the 10th Baron Ward, was a Liberal politician. He married the socialite Freda May Birkin. Their daughter Penelope Dudley-Ward was a well-known actress. Sir John Hubert Ward (1870–1938), second son of the first Earl, was a major in the army and courtier. His son John Ward (1909–1990) was a colonel in the Life Guards. Robert Ward, third son of the first Earl, was Conservative Member of Parliament for Crewe. Edward Frederick Ward (1907–1987), third son of the second Earl, was a group captain in the Royal Air Force. George Ward, fourth and youngest son of the second Earl, was a Conservative politician and was created Viscount Ward of Witley in 1960. The actress Rachel Ward and her sister the environmental campaigner Tracy Louise Ward are both daughters of Peter Alistair Ward, third son of the third Earl.

=== The 5th Earl of Dudley ===
William Humble David Jeremy Ward, 5th Earl of Dudley (1947-2026), also known as David Dudley, was the son of the 4th Earl and his wife Stella Carcano y Morra. He was educated at Eton College and Christ Church, Oxford, and was styled as Viscount Ednam between 1969 and 2013.

On 3 July 1972 Dudley married firstly Sarah Mary Coats, daughter of Captain Sir Alastair Francis Stuart Coats, 4th Baronet, and his wife Lukyn Gordon; they were divorced in 1976, and in the same year he married secondly Debra Louise Pinney, daughter of George Robert Pinney. They were divorced in 1980, after having one child, Bethany Rowena Ward (born 1977).

On 16 November 2013 he succeeded to the peerages. He died in Spain on 7 February 2026, and was buried in Vélez-Rubio, Almería.

=== Family seat ===
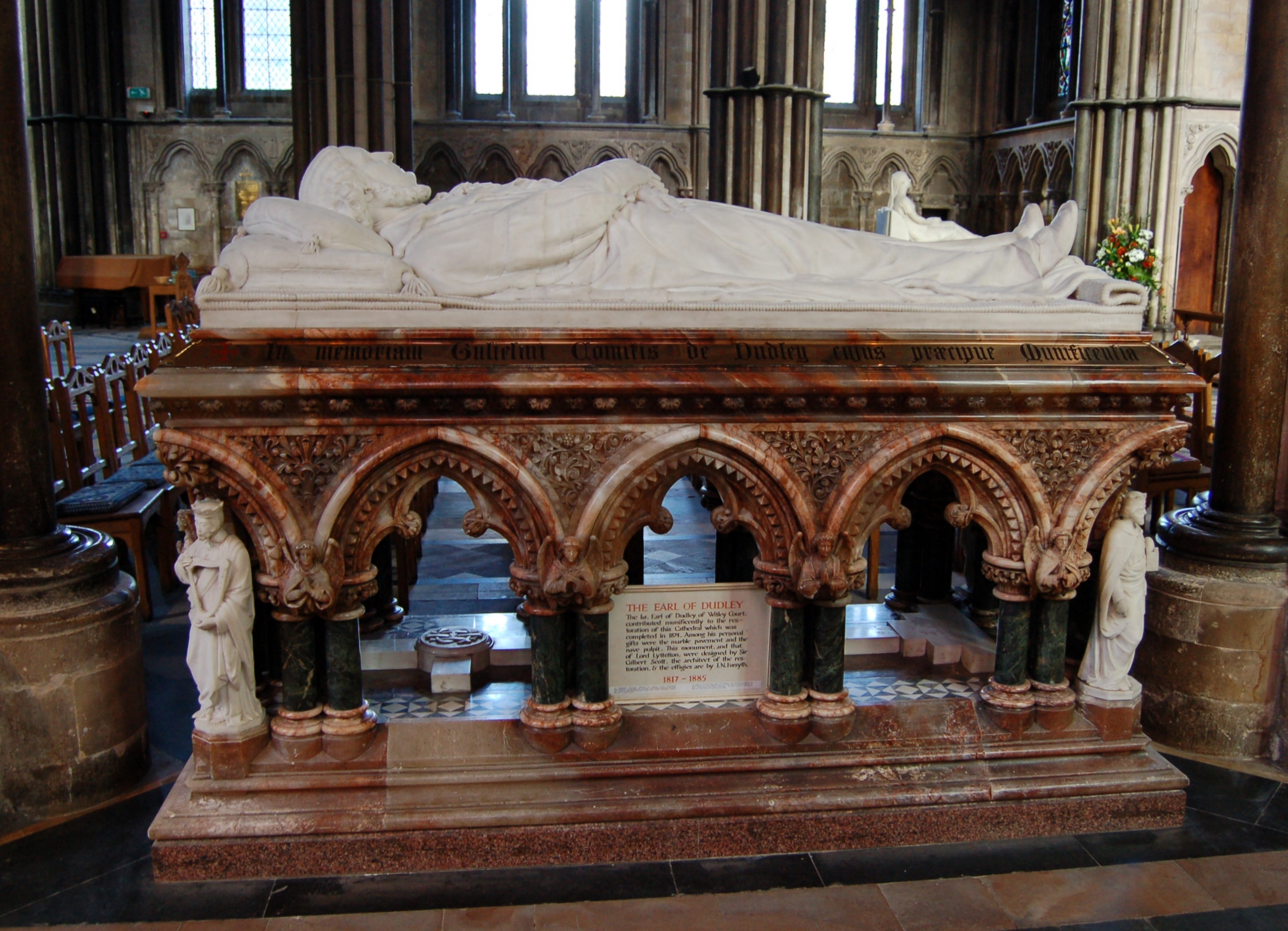
The funerary monument to the 1st Earl of Dudley of the 1860 creation in Worcester Cathedral

The family seat of the Earls of Dudley was Himley Hall until the 1830s, after which Witley Court served as the main residence along with Dudley House. Witley Court was sold in 1920 and became derelict after a fire in 1937. The 1st Earl of Dudley of the 1860 creation was originally buried in the crypt of Saint Michael and All Angels Church in Great Witley, but was later moved to Worcester Cathedral where he is commemorated with a large funerary monument. His more recent successors – including the 4th Earl and his wife – rest in a private burial ground at Himley. Located at the rear of Himley's parish church, it is laid out as a memorial garden and normally closed to the public.

== Barons Ward (1644) of Birmingham ==
- Humble Ward, 1st Baron Ward (1614–1670)
- Edward Ward, 7th Baron Dudley, 2nd Baron Ward (1631–1701)
- Edward Ward, 8th Baron Dudley, 3rd Baron Ward (1683–1704)
- Edward Ward, 9th Baron Dudley, 4th Baron Ward (1704–1731)
- William Ward, 10th Baron Dudley, 5th Baron Ward (1685–1740)
- John Ward, 6th Baron Ward (1700–1774) (created Viscount Dudley and Ward in 1763)

== Viscounts Dudley and Ward (1763) ==
- John Ward, 1st Viscount Dudley and Ward (1700–1774)
- John Ward, 2nd Viscount Dudley and Ward (1725–1788)
- William Ward, 3rd Viscount Dudley and Ward (1750–1823)
- John William Ward, 4th Viscount Dudley and Ward (1781–1833) (created Earl of Dudley in 1827)

== Earls of Dudley, First Creation (1827) ==
- John William Ward, 1st Earl of Dudley (1781–1833)

== Barons Ward (1644; Reverted) ==
- William Humble Ward, 10th Baron Ward (1781–1835)
- William Ward, 11th Baron Ward (1817–1885) (created Earl of Dudley in 1860)

== Earls of Dudley, Second Creation (1860) ==
- William Ward, 1st Earl of Dudley (1817–1885)
- William Humble Ward, 2nd Earl of Dudley (1867–1932)
- William Humble Eric Ward, 3rd Earl of Dudley (1894–1969)
- William Humble Davis Ward, 4th Earl of Dudley (1920–2013)
- William Humble David Jeremy Ward, 5th Earl of Dudley (1947–2026)
- Leander Grenville Dudley Ward, 6th Earl of Dudley (born 1971)

== Line of succession ==
Line of succession (simplified)
- William Ward, 2nd Earl of Dudley (1867–1932)
  - William Ward, 3rd Earl of Dudley (1894–1969)
    - William Ward, 4th Earl of Dudley (1920–2013)
      - William Ward, 5th Earl of Dudley (1947-2026)
      - Leander Ward, 6th Earl of Dudley (born 1971)
    - Hon. Peter Alistair Ward (1926–2008)
      - (1). Alexander Evelyn Giles Ward (born 1961)
        - (2). Archibald Rupert William Ward (born 1993)
      - (3). Jeremy Christopher Ward (born 1975)
        - (4). Harry Peter Ward (born 2007)
        - (5). Hector Geordie Ward (born 2009)
      - (6). Benjamin Robin Ward (born 1978)
  - Hon. Roderick John Ward (1902–1952)
    - male descendants

== See also ==
- Baron Dudley
- Viscount Ward of Witley
- Dudley Castle
