= Alexander Fraser, 14th Lord Saltoun =

Alexander Fraser (1710–1751) was the 14th Lord Saltoun.

Peerage of Scotland
| Preceded by Alexander Fraser | Lord Saltoun; 1748–1751 | Succeeded by George Fraser |
