= Ferdinando Dudley Lea, 11th Baron Dudley =

18th c. English peer

Ferdinando Dudley Lea, 11th Baron Dudley (1710–1757) succeeded his uncle, William Ward, 10th Baron Dudley in the Barony of Dudley in 1740. However, he did not inherit the ancestral estates of the Barony, including Dudley Castle, which descended on a relative, John Ward. On Ferdinando's death in 1757 the barony fell into abeyance between his sisters.

== Life ==
Ferdinando Dudley Lea, baptised on 14 September 1710, was the son of William Lea and Frances, the only sister of William Ward. William Ward became 10th Baron Dudley and 5th Baron Ward in 1731 and his death on 20 May 1740, the title of Baron Dudley was inherited by Ferdinando Dudley Lea.

Ferdinando did not inherit the ancestral lands of the Barons Dudley and Ward which descended on the heir male, John Ward, who was later created 1st Viscount Dudley and Ward.

Ferdinando took his seat in the House of Lords on 26 November 1740 and he inherited Halesowen Grange from his father, William Lea, who died on 31 January 1741.

On Ferdinando's death at Halesowen Grange on 21 October 1757, the title of Baron of Dudley fell into abeyance between his sisters. The abeyance was terminated in 1916 when a descendant of Ferdinando's eldest sister, Anne, was recognised as 12th Baron Dudley. Ferdinando is buried in a modest grave at St John the Baptist Church, Halesowen.

Peerage of England
Preceded by William Ward	Baron Dudley; 1740–1757 then abeyant until 1916	Succeeded by Ferdinando Dudley William Lea Smith
