= Baron Dudley =

Title in the Peerage of England

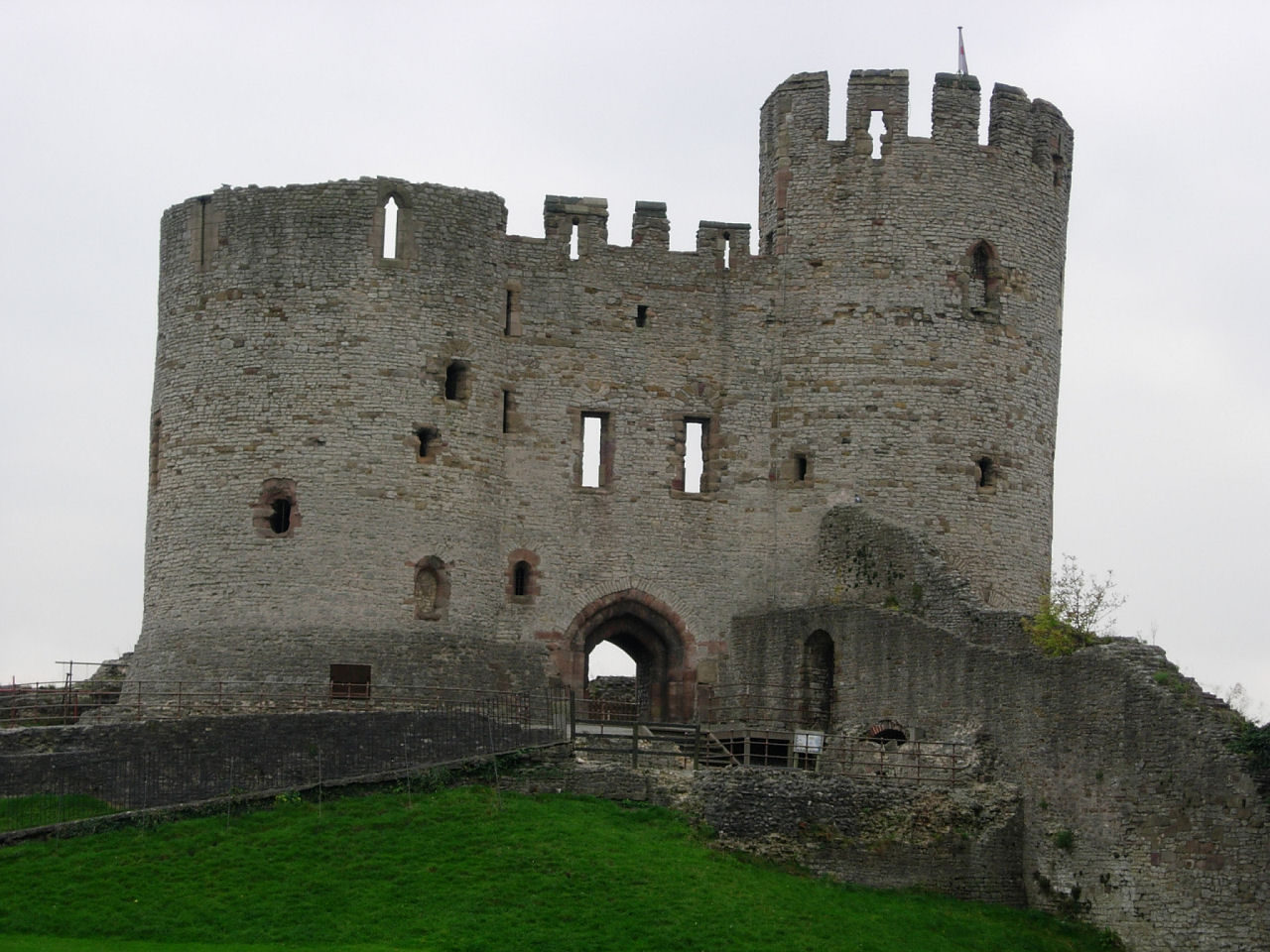
The remains of Dudley Castle.

Baron Dudley is a title in the Peerage of England. It was created circa 1440 for John Sutton, a soldier who served as Lord Lieutenant of Ireland. The title descended in the Sutton family until the 17th century when Frances Sutton, the heir apparent to the title, married Humble Ward who was granted the title Baron Ward in 1644. Their heirs inherited both titles until 1740 when the differing rules of inheritance meant that the Barony of Dudley descended on Ferdinando Dudley Lea, who became the 11th Baron whilst the Barony of Ward went to John Ward, who later became 1st Viscount Dudley and Ward. On Ferdinando's death in 1757, the title fell into abeyance. The title was revived in 1916.

== History ==
Baron Dudley is a title in the Peerage of England. It was created circa 1440 for John Sutton, a soldier who served as Lord Lieutenant of Ireland. According to Debrett's Peerage and Baronetage he was actually summoned to Parliament as "Johanni de Sutton de Duddeley militi", whereby he is held to have become Baron Dudley. The title is sometimes referred to as Baron Sutton of Dudley. The peerage was created by writ, which means that it can descend through both male and female lines.

It is in fact arguable that the title arose even earlier, as his ancestor John Sutton (died 1359) had a writ of summons to the Council on 25 February 1342, but neither he nor his son (died c. 1370), grandson (died 10 March 1396) or great grandson (all called John Sutton of Dudley) were summoned, so that they can probably not be regarded as peers.

Lord Dudley's great-grandson, the third Baron, managed to get himself severely into debt and lost the family seat of Dudley Castle to his cousin John Dudley, 1st Duke of Northumberland. He became known as "Lord Quondam" ("Lord Has-been" or "Lord Formerly"). However, Dudley Castle and the other family estates were restored to his son, the fourth Baron. He was succeeded by his son, Edward the fifth Baron, who like his grandfather came heavily into debt. To clear his debts his granddaughter and heir, Frances, was married to Sir Humble Ward, the son of a wealthy jeweller. Frances became the sixth holder of the title. In 1644 her husband Humble Ward was created Baron Ward, of Birmingham in the County of Warwick, by letters patent.

They were both succeeded by their son, the seventh and second Baron respectively. On the death in 1740 of the latter's grandson, the tenth Baron Dudley and fifth Baron Ward, the two titles separated. The barony of Ward, which could only be inherited by males, was passed on to the late Baron's kinsman, the sixth Baron (see the Earl of Dudley for the later history of this title). The barony of Dudley was inherited by the Baron's nephew, Ferdinando Dudley Lea, 11th Baron Dudley. He was the son of Frances, sister of the tenth Baron, and her husband William Lea. However, on Ferdinando's death in 1757 the peerage fell into abeyance between his sisters. The title remained in abeyance for 159 years. In 1869, Bernard Burke, who researched some of the co-heirs of the title during the period of abeyance, wrote of the Barony: "where can we find a more striking contrast than this mournful tale of the Barony of Dudley? The history of that famous title would, in its first chapter, speak of chivalry, warlike achievement, and magnificent hospitality in the ancient castle from which the Barony took its name. The last chapter would tell the story of the Halesowen farmer, the custom-house clerk, and the toll-bar-keeper, all resident within range of that very castle."

In 1916 the abeyance was terminated in favour of Ferdinando Dudley William Lea Smith, who became the twelfth Baron. He was the great-great-grandson of Anne, sister of the eleventh Baron, and her husband William Smith. As of 2010 the title is held by his grandson, the fifteenth Baron, who succeeded his mother in 2002 (who in her turn had succeeded her younger brother).

The holders of the title (until 1740) were the owners of Dudley Castle and an extensive estate around it, including the manors of Dudley, Sedgley, Kingswinford and Rowley Somery in Rowley Regis. By the 16th century, their main home was Himley Hall. On the death of the tenth Baron in 1740, the barony of Dudley passed to a female-line heir (see above), whereas the main estates were entailed to follow the barony of Ward and passed to a cousin. However, certain estates that had recently been purchased passed with the title Lord Dudley to the aforementioned Ferdinando Dudley Lea, the eleventh Baron Dudley.

The family surname of the first five barons was formally 'Sutton', but in practice, they seem always to have been called 'Dudley'. In title deeds and other formal documents, the surname often appears as 'Sutton otherwise Dudley'.

== Predecessors ==
- John de Sutton II (1310–1359), was summoned to the Council in 1342 as first Baron Sutton of Dudley
- Sir John de Sutton III (1338 – c. 1370)
- Sir John de Sutton IV (1361–1396)
- Sir John de Sutton V (1380–1406)

== Barons Dudley (1440) ==
- John Sutton, 1st Baron Dudley (1400–1487)
- Edward Sutton, 2nd Baron Dudley (1459–1532)
- John Sutton, 3rd Baron Dudley (c. 1495 – 1553)
- Edward Sutton, 4th Baron Dudley (died 1586)
- Edward Sutton, 5th Baron Dudley (1567–1643)
- Frances Ward, 6th Baroness Dudley (1611–1697)
- Edward Ward, 7th Baron Dudley, 2nd Baron Ward (1631-1701)
- Edward Ward, 8th Baron Dudley, 3rd Baron Ward (1683–1704)
- Edward Ward, 9th Baron Dudley, 4th Baron Ward (1704–1731)
- William Ward, 10th Baron Dudley, 5th Baron Ward (1685-1740)
- Ferdinando Dudley Lea, 11th Baron Dudley (1710–1757) (abeyant 1757)
- Ferdinando Dudley William Lea Smith, 12th Baron Dudley (1872–1936) (abeyance terminated 1916)
- Ferdinando Dudley Henry Lea Smith, 13th Baron Dudley (1910–1972)
- Barbara Amy Felicity Hamilton, 14th Baroness Dudley (1907–2002)
- Jim Anthony Hill Wallace, 15th Baron Dudley (1930–2024)
- Jeremy William Guilford Wallace, 16th Baron Dudley (born 1964)

The heir apparent is the present holder's son Hon. Dominic Wallace (born 1997)

== See also ==
- Earl of Dudley
- Duke of Northumberland (1551 creation)
- Baron de L'Isle and Dudley
