= Philip Stanhope, 2nd Earl Stanhope =

British Earl

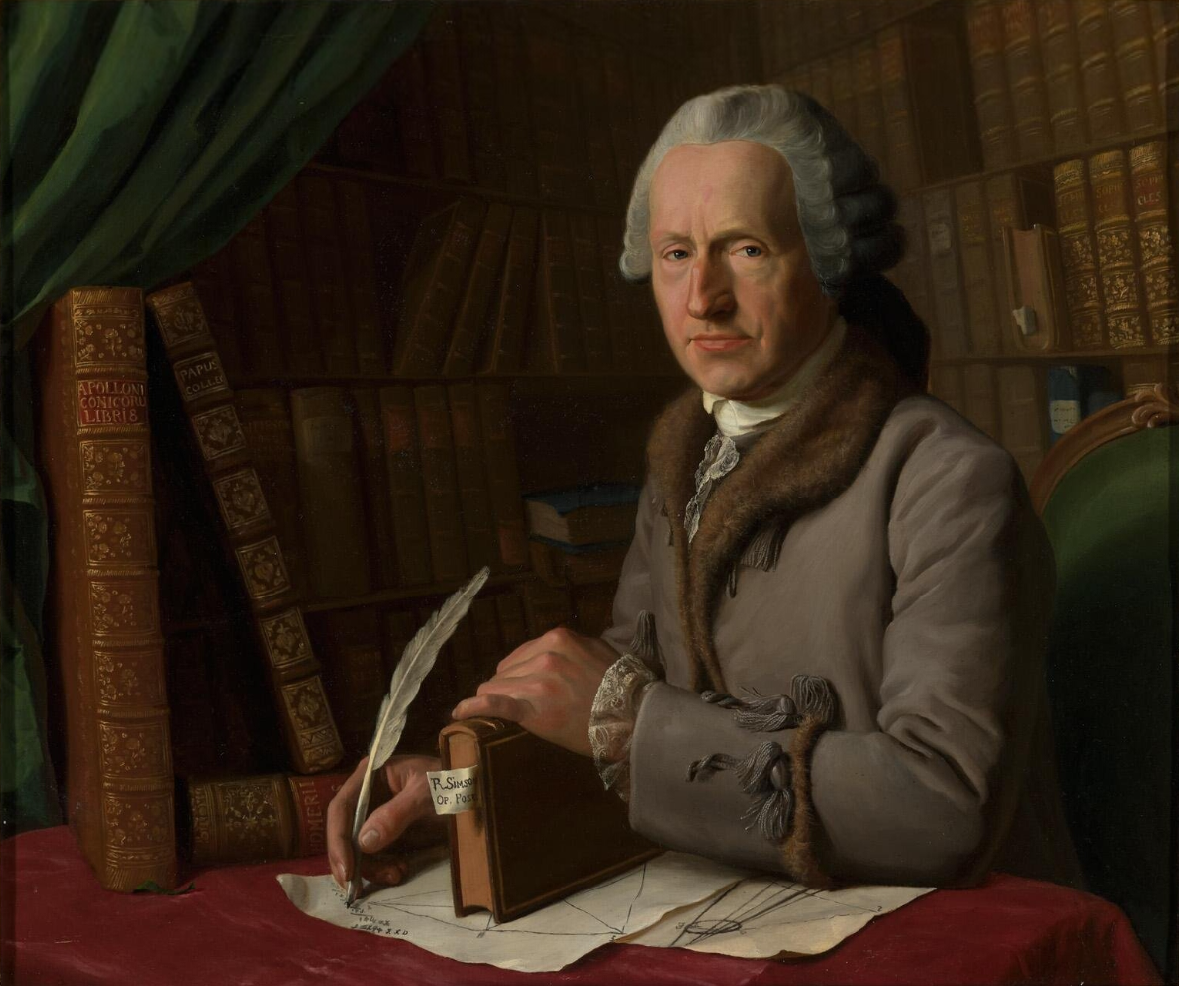
Portrait of Stanhope attributed to his son Charles, 1774

Philip Stanhope, 2nd Earl Stanhope, FRS (15 August 1714 – 7 March 1786) was a British peer.

== Life ==
The son of James Stanhope, 1st Earl Stanhope, and Lucy Pitt, he succeeded to his father's titles in 1721. He was a Fellow of the Royal Society from 1735, and had a lifelong interest in mathematics. Stanhope was elected as a member to the American Philosophical Society in 1774. He privileged the pursuit of science and mathematics over politics and became close to prominent natural philosophers such as Joseph Priestley and Benjamin Franklin. As a patron of various mathematicians, Stanhope came into contact with Thomas Bayes, one of the founders of Bayesian inference.

== Marriage and issue ==
On 25 July 1745, Stanhope married Grizel Hamilton, daughter of Charles Hamilton, Lord Binning. They had two sons:

- Philip Stanhope, Viscount Mahon (24 June 1746 – 6 July 1763).
- Charles Stanhope, 3rd Earl Stanhope (3 August 1753 – 15 December 1816).

Peerage of Great Britain
Preceded by James Stanhope	Earl Stanhope; 1721–1786	Succeeded by Charles Stanhope
