= James Sandilands, 7th Lord Torphichen =

Scottish nobleman (died 1753)

James Sandilands, 7th Lord Torphichen (died 1753) was a Scottish nobleman and army officer, a loyalist of the 1715 Jacobite Rebellion.

== Life ==
He was the eldest surviving son of Walter Sandilands, 6th Lord Torphichen (died 1698), by his second wife, Hon. Catherine Alexander, eldest daughter of William Alexander, 1st Earl of Stirling. He was a supporter of the Acts of Union 1707. Subsequently he served under the Duke of Marlborough as lieutenant-colonel of the 7th Dragoons.

At the outbreak of the rebellion in 1715 Torphichen's regiment was stationed in Scotland, and on 17 October he made an attempt to drive the highlanders out of Seton House, but without success. He was also present with his regiment at the Battle of Sheriffmuir.

In 1722 Torphichen was appointed a lord of police. He died on 10 August 1753.

== Family ==
By his wife, Lady Jean Hume, youngest daughter of Patrick Hume, 1st Earl of Marchmont, Torphichen had three daughters, who died unmarried, and eight sons. Of the sons:

- James, Master of Torphichen, a lieutenant in the 44th Foot, was badly wounded at the Battle of Prestonpans, and died on 20 April 1749;
- the second son, Walter, who became eighth lord, was sheriff-depute of Mid-Lothian at the time of the Jacobite Rebellion of 1745, and was active then in Edinburgh;
- Patrick, the third son, remembered for claiming to be bewitched by several local people in 1720;
- Andrew and Robert, who were known as soldiers.

== Notes ==
Attribution

This article incorporates text from a publication now in the public domain: Lee, Sidney, ed. (1897). "Sandilands, James (d.1753)". Dictionary of National Biography. Vol. 50. London: Smith, Elder & Co.

Peerage of Scotland
| Preceded by Walter Sandilands | Lord Torphichen; 1696–1753 | Succeeded by Walter Sandilands |
