= John Ward, 1st Viscount Dudley and Ward =

British politician (1704–1774)

John Ward, 1st Viscount Dudley and Ward (6 March 1704 – 6 May 1774), known as John Ward until 1740 and as the 6th Baron Ward from 1740 to 1763, was a British Tory politician who sat in the House of Commons from 1727 to 1734.

== Life ==
Ward was the son of William Ward and the grandson of the Hon. William Ward (d. 1714), second son of Humble Ward, 1st Baron Ward. His mother was Mary, daughter of the Hon. John Grey, younger son of Henry Grey, 1st Earl of Stamford. He inherited the Willingsworth estate and the rest of the manor of Sedgley on the death of his father in 1720, and the entailed portion of the Dudley estates on the death of his cousin William Ward, 5th Baron Ward in 1740.

He was returned to Parliament for Newcastle-under-Lyme in 1727, a seat he held until 1734. In 1740 he succeeded his second cousin as the sixth Baron Ward and entered the House of Lords. He was further honoured in 1763 when he was created 1st Viscount Dudley and Ward, of Dudley in the County of Worcester.

== Marriage and issue ==
Ward married firstly Anna Maria, daughter of Charles Bourchier, in 1723. He married secondly Mary, daughter of John Carver, in 1745. There were children from both marriages. Ward died in May 1774, aged 70, and was succeeded by his son from his first marriage, John. His son from his second marriage, William (who succeeded in the viscountcy in 1788), was the father of John Ward, 1st Earl of Dudley, Foreign Secretary from 1827 to 1828. Mary, Viscountess Dudley and Ward, survived her husband by eight years and died in 1782.

== Notes ==
Parliament of Great Britain
Preceded by Thomas Leveson-Gower; Sir Walter Bagot	Member of Parliament for Newcastle-under-Lyme; 1727–1734; With: Baptist Leveson-Gower	Succeeded by Baptist Leveson-Gower; John Lawton
Peerage of Great Britain
New creation	Viscount Dudley and Ward; 1763–1774	Succeeded by John Ward
Peerage of England
Preceded by William Ward	Baron Ward; 1740–1774	Succeeded by John Ward
