= Ferdinando Sutton =

English aristocrat

- Born: 1588
- Died: 22 November 1621
- Buried: St Margaret's, Westminster
- Spouse(s): Honora Seymour
- Issue: Frances Ward, 6th Baroness Dudley
- Father: Edward Sutton, 5th Baron Dudley
- Mother: Theodosia Harington

Sir Ferdinando Sutton (1588–1621) was an English aristocrat.

== Family and early life ==
The son of Edward Sutton, 5th Baron Dudley (1567–1643) and Theodosia Harington (died 1649). The Sutton family used their title "Dudley" as a surname, and so he was sometimes known as "Ferdinando Dudley".

His father abandoned his wife for his mistress, Elizabeth Tomlinson. According to a bill produced in the Star Chamber by his political rival in Staffordshire, Gilbert Lyttelton, in 1592, he had "left that virtuous lady his wife in London without sustenance, and took to his home a lewd and infamous woman, a base collier's daughter". Lyttleton and Sutton had a dispute over the Manor of Prestwood at Kinver.

In 1597, Ferdinando and his sister, Anne, were lodged in Clerkenwell with Euseby Paget, rector of St Anne and St Agnes, and Mrs. Percy as wards of their aunt and uncle, Elizabeth and Edward Montagu of Boughton. The Privy Council made arrangements for a settlement and payments but Lord Dudley refused to pay.

== Court connections ==
Ferdinando Sutton was knighted on 4 June 1610, when Prince Henry was created Prince of Wales. His sister, Anne, joined the household of Princess Elizabeth and was known as "Mistress Dudley".

== Marriage and children ==
Ferdinando Sutton married Honora Seymour, a daughter of Edward Seymour, Viscount Beauchamp and Honora Rogers in July 1610. Honora, Lady Dudley died in March 1620 and was buried in the parish church of St Edmund in Dudley.

His daughter, Frances, was born in 1611 at Dudley Castle. She married Humble Ward (born 1612), son of a London goldsmith, William Ward and Elizabeth Humble (died 1616). According to William Dugdale, her grandfather arranged her marriage to Ward to alleviate his debts, which were large because of his relationship with Elizabeth Tomlinson.

== Death and burial ==
He died on 22 November 1621 of smallpox and was buried at St Margaret's, Westminster. On the previous day he bequeathed his estates and possessions to his sister "Margaret Dudley", wife of Miles Hobart. The will was witnessed by his aunt Mary Wingfield and his servant William Dudley.
