= Thomas Gerard, 1st Baron Gerard =

English landowner and politician (c. 1564 – 1618)

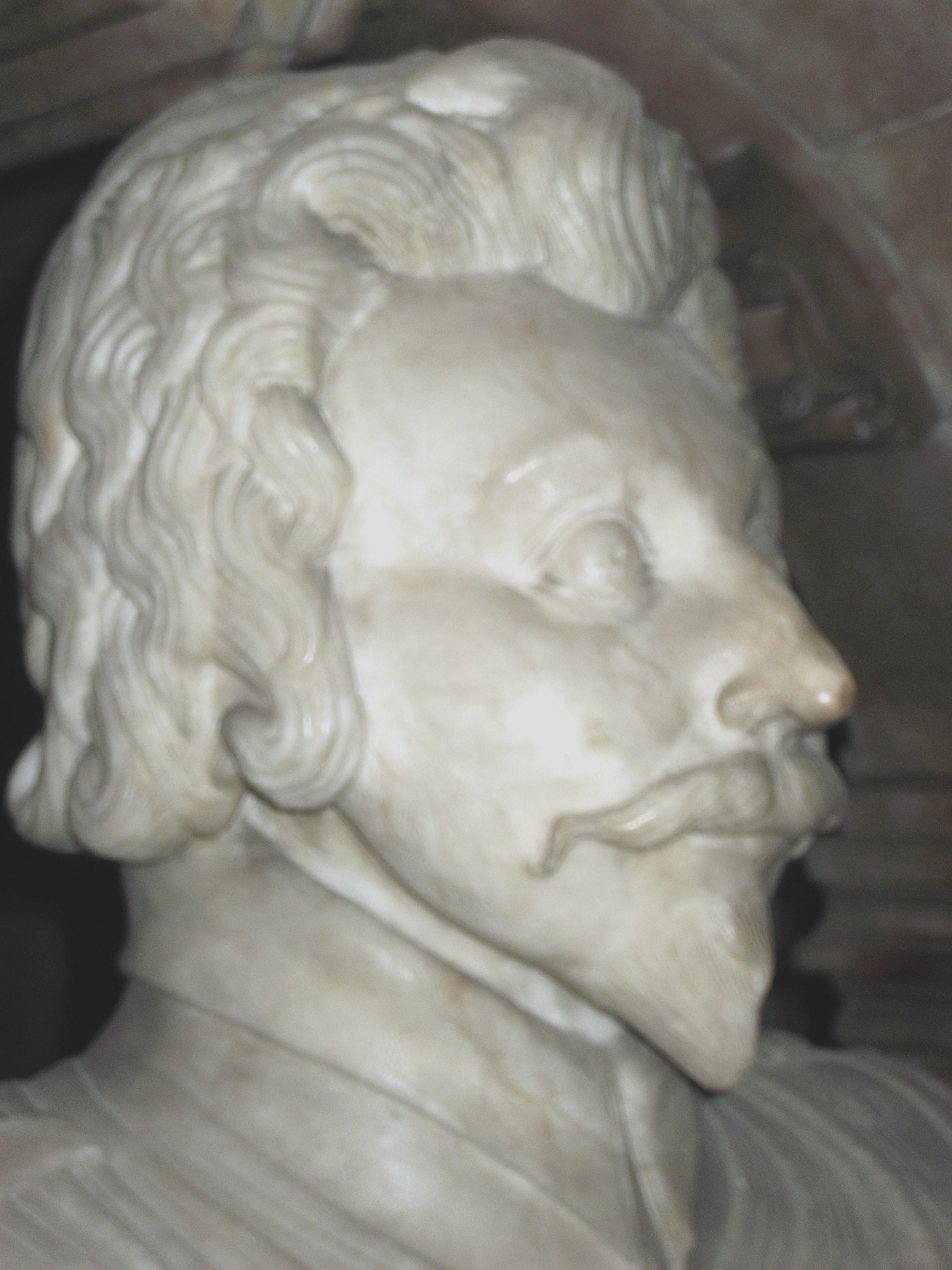
Thomas Gerard, 1st Baron Gerard (c. 1564–1618). from a composite family memorial in the Gerard Chapel, Church of St John the Baptist, Ashley, Staffordshire.

Thomas Gerard, 1st Baron Gerard (c. 1564 – 15 January 1618) was a Staffordshire and Lancashire landowner and politician, a member of six English parliaments for three different constituencies. Although a prominent member of the Essex faction in the reign of Elizabeth I, he avoided involvement in the Essex Rebellion and received greater honours, including a peerage, in the reign of James I.

== Background and early life ==
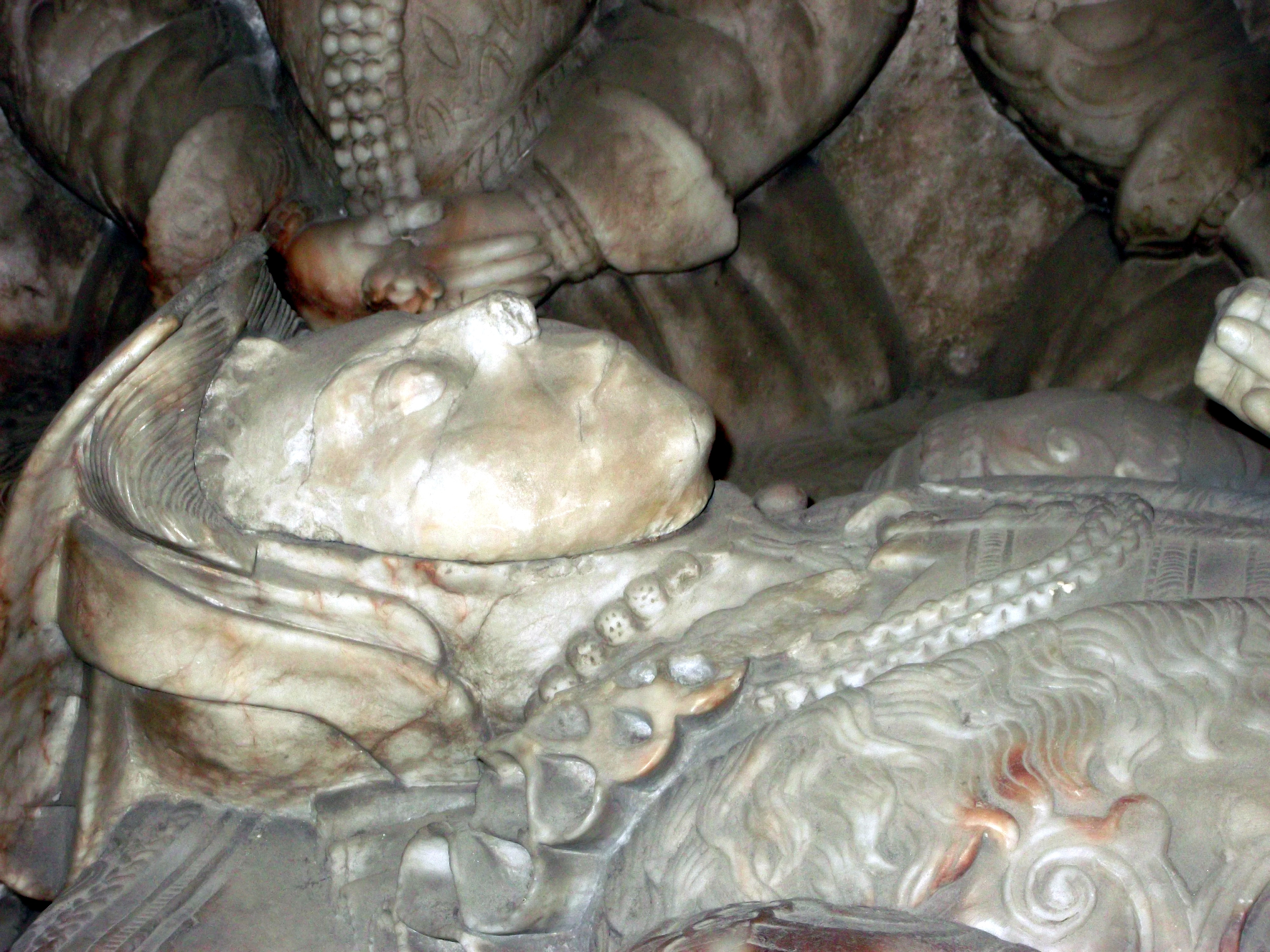
Thomas Gerard's mother: Anne Radcliffe or Ratcliffe of Winmarleigh, Lancashire, wife of Gilbert Gerard. Gerard memorial, Ashley.

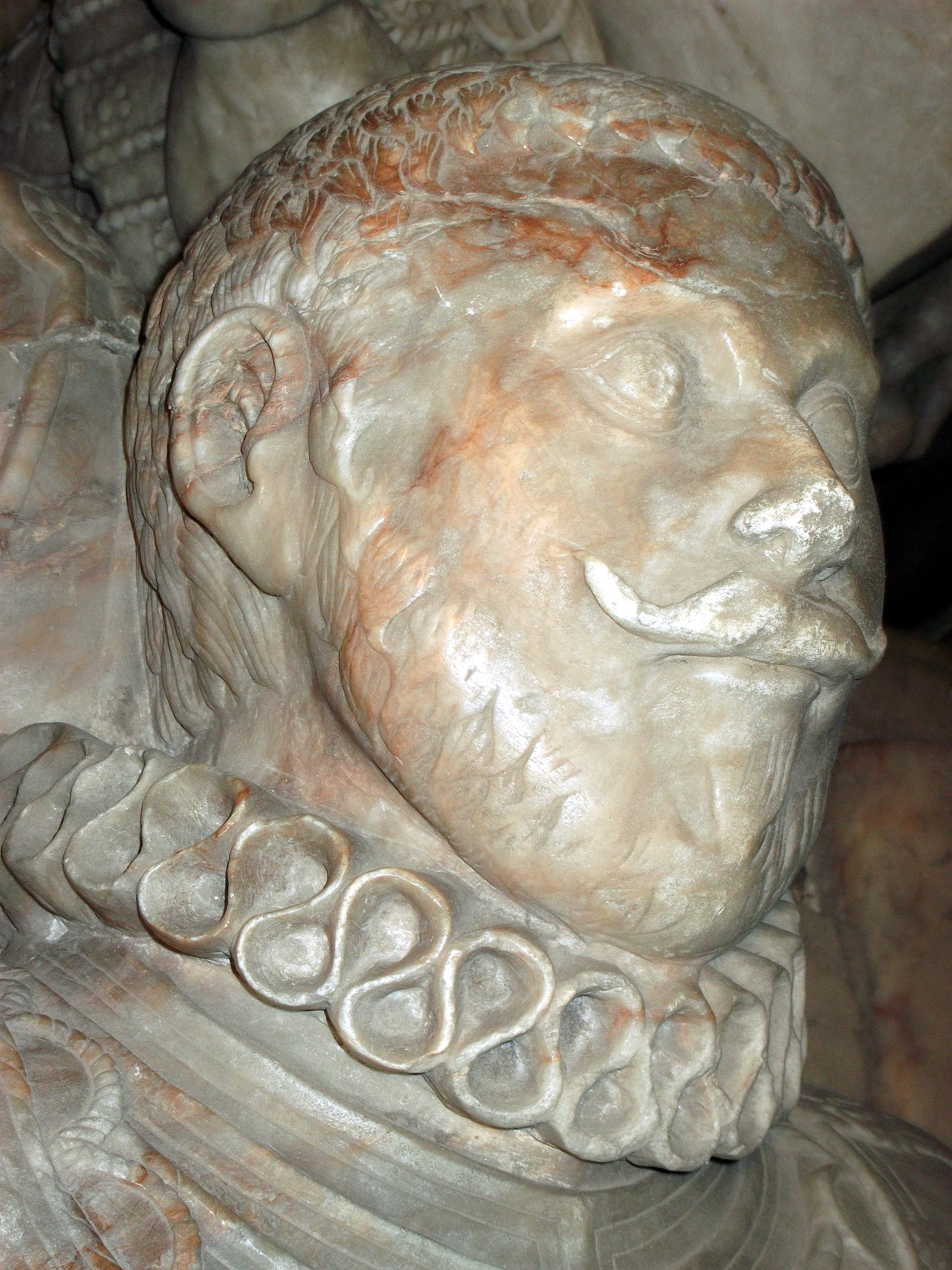
Thomas Gerard's father: Gilbert Gerard (before 1523–1593), Attorney General 1559–81, Master of the Rolls 1581–93. Gerard memorial, Ashley.

Thomas Gerard's parents were:

- Sir Gilbert Gerard of Ince, Lancashire, and Gerrard's Bromley, Staffordshire. Gilbert was a distinguished barrister who was appointed Attorney General at the beginning of Elizabeth's reign and held the post for more than 22 years, until he was appointed Master of the Rolls in 1581. He was an important figure in the imposition of the Elizabethan Religious Settlement.
- Anne Ratcliffe, daughter of Thomas Ratcliffe of Winmarleigh, Lancashire. An heiress who brought considerable wealth to the marriage, her wardship was held by Sir John Holcroft, Gilbert Gerard's uncle, who arranged the marriage. Like many of the Lancashire gentry, she remained a Catholic to the end of her life.

Thomas Gerard was educated privately by a Thomas Taylor. It is thought his childhood was spent in the south of England, as he was described as coming from Harrow on the Hill at his admission to Caius College, Cambridge, in 1580, aged 16. He was first returned to the House of Commons of England aged only 20, as member for Lancaster.

== Early parliamentary career ==
Gerard's early political career was owed to his father's influence. Gilbert Gerard had been appointed vice-chancellor at Lancaster in 1571. The Duchy of Lancaster, merged with the Crown in 1399, had always been decisive in the choice of members of parliament for the borough, and candidates were generally friends of duchy officials, although election was formally by the mayor, bailiffs, burgesses, and citizens.

In 1584, they simply sent a blank indenture or election return to Gilbert Gerard, the duchy's chief law officer, and he filled in the name of his son. Thomas was returned alongside Henry Sadler, son of Ralph Sadler, the Chancellor of the Duchy of Lancaster. Sadler had already represented Lancaster in the two previous parliaments. Both Sadler and Gerard were returned as members for Lancaster again in 1586.

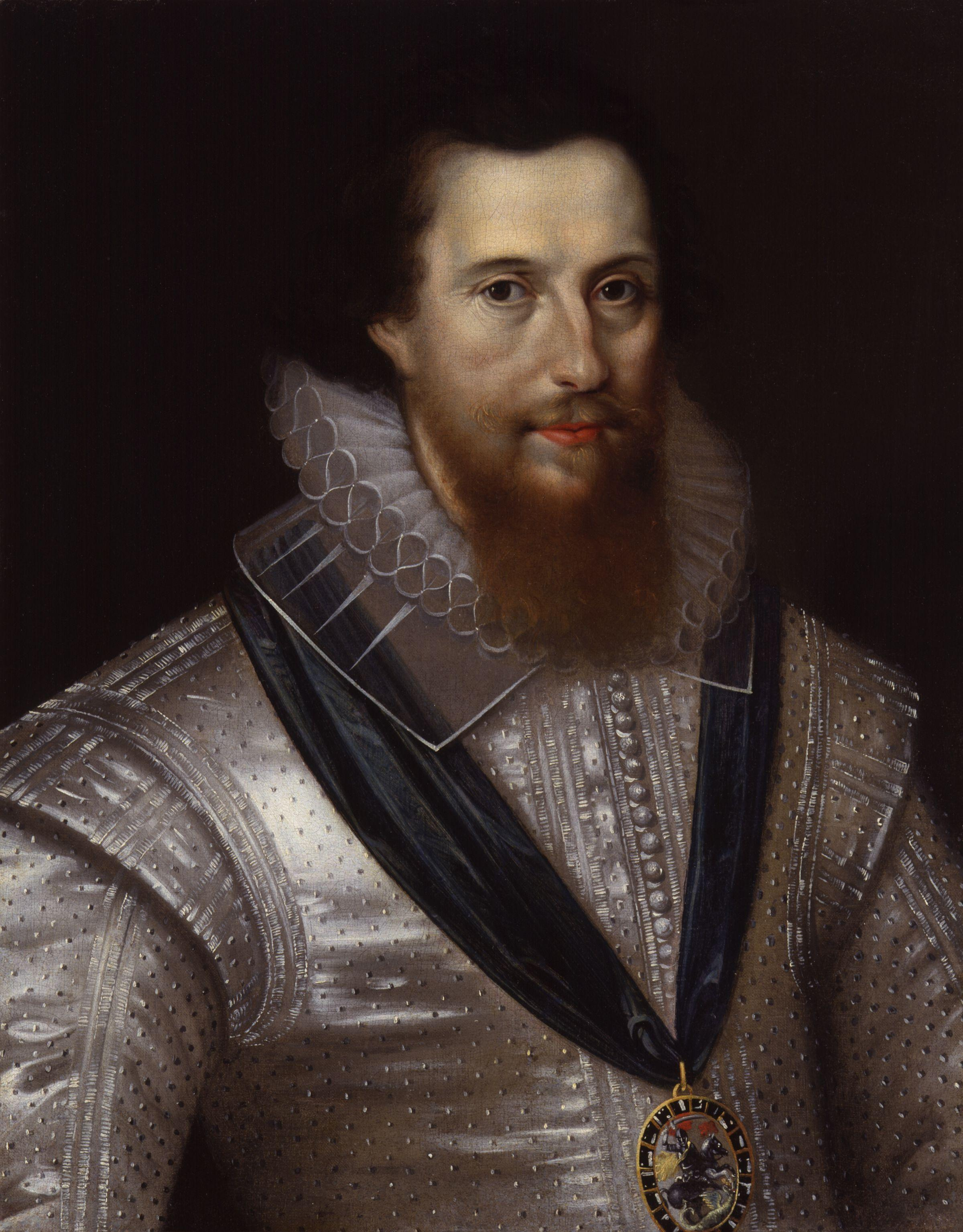
Robert Devereux, 2nd Earl of Essex, long a favourite of Elizabeth I, rival to the Cecils, and a patron of Thomas Gerard.

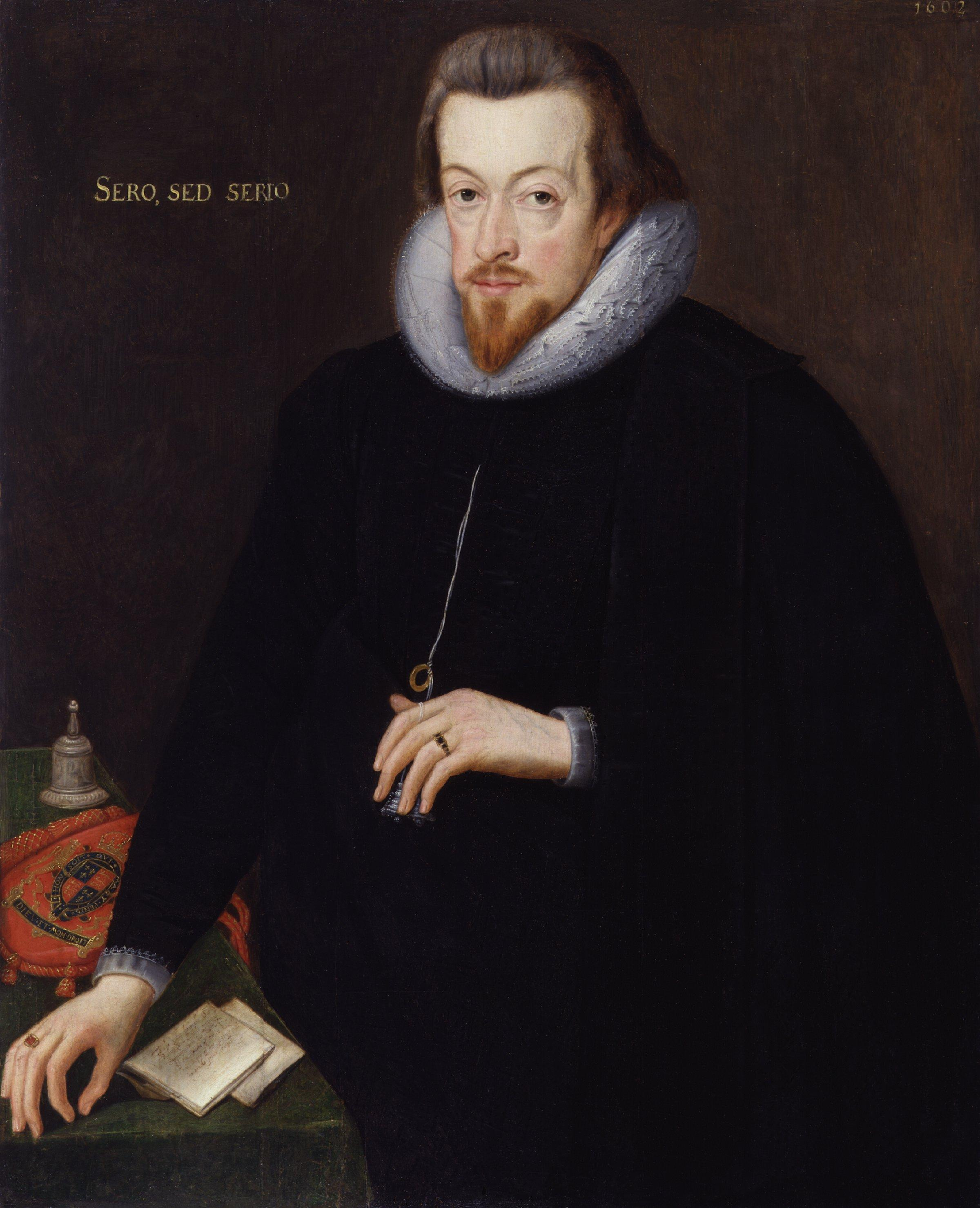
Robert Cecil, later 1st Earl of Salisbury. Although Cecil was an enemy of Essex, Gerard cultivated good relations with him through their shared love of falconry.

In the parliamentary elections of October 1588, Thomas Gerard was returned by both Lancashire and Staffordshire. His family had estates in both counties and he had by this time married Alice Rivet, daughter and heiress of Sir Thomas Rivet of Chippenham, who had lands in Staffordshire. So it was for Staffordshire he decided to sit. It is possible that both he and the electors were influenced by Robert Devereux, 2nd Earl of Essex, who was the rising power in the county and leader of a powerful court faction. As a result, Lancashire was forced to hold a by-election in February 1589, just after the assembly of the parliament.

The other knight of the shire for Staffordshire in the 1589 parliament was Walter Harcourt. His family, based at Ellenhall and Ranton Abbey were part of a religiously conservative faction that had dominated Staffordshire politics early in Elizabeth's reign. However, Essex was determined to win over both Gerard and Harcourt.

== Member of the Essex faction ==
In 1591 Essex was put in charge of an English force sent to aid Henry IV of France in his war with the Catholic League. He persuaded both Gerard and Harcourt to join the expedition. After a successful campaign, he knighted both of them before the walls of Rouen. Both seem to have been won over to his side.

Essex regarded Staffordshire as his own county and was trying to build a power base in it. The county contained Chartley Castle, his main seat, and Lettice Knollys, his mother, lived at Drayton Bassett with Sir Christopher Blount, her husband, who was a crony of Essex. The earl was appointed Staffordshire's Custos Rotulorum sometime in the early 1590s. He gathered around him a faction made up of ambitious, mainly young, members of local landowning families, particularly the Littleton, Bagot, Chetwynd, Trew and Aston families. While leaning personally towards the Puritan wing of the Church of England, Essex was tolerant of other beliefs. In 1590 it was rumoured he had links to the Catholic double agent Gilbert Gifford, son of the Staffordshire landowner John Giffard. Gerard's own father was accused of being "a protestant at London and a papist in Lancashire", so the relatively relaxed attitude of Essex may have been an attraction, and he was similar in age and background to the majority of the earl's Staffordshire supporters.

Gerard proved particularly helpful and accommodating to Essex in 1593. A parliament was summoned on 4 January. Essex had already appointed Sir Edward Littleton, Sir Edward Aston and Richard Bagot as his agents in Staffordshire. On 2 January 1593 Essex he had written urging them to secure the return of his step-father Christopher Blount in the forthcoming elections. A week later he wrote again, this time asking them to support Gerard as second member. By this time, however, Harcourt had also thrown his hat into the ring. Essex never wrote to clarify or resolve the situation, leaving his Staffordshire supporters confused. Fortunately, Gerard still had influence in Lancashire and was able again to secure a nomination for the county seat.

The election in Lancashire was not entirely a foregone conclusion. There was great bitterness between Henry Stanley, 4th Earl of Derby, who had great influence in the county, and Richard Molyneux of Sefton, who had represented the county in the past and wished to do so again. Molyneux was Gerard's brother-in-law, and there was a serious danger that Derby might promote one or more candidates against the pair of them and thus create a contest for the seats. In the event, Gerard was returned with Molyneux. Before the parliament convened, Gilbert Gerard died, leaving Thomas as heir to his substantial estates and his properties in London. Derby waited until after the short-lived parliament to pursue his feud with Molyneux, committing him to the Fleet prison and hauling him before the Privy Council, although the earl died in September and his eldest son and successor a few months later. Thereafter, Gerard was able to build good relationships with both the great Merseyside landowning families.

Gerard's efficient and uncomplaining service was well-rewarded, as his connection with Essex opened up many lines of preferment, especially in various military ventures. In 1595 he was appointed captain of the Isle of Man. He was instructed to reorganise the defences discreetly, without disturbing the civil government. Perhaps already feeling some disquiet at the frequent ineptitude of Essex, Gerard sent a present of a trained sparrowhawk to Robert Cecil, the Secretary of State and the main rival of Essex for the queen's attention. He wrote an accompanying note to make sure his gesture of friendship was noted:

I send you by this bearer a sparhawk, which is an excellent hawk for anything you will fly her at; she will kill a "pye" (black and white pigeon) very well if your man be skilful to make the flight. I am going towards West Chester (a specific name for Chester) and I mean to take shipping so soon as the wind will give me leave. I humbly entreat your favour in my absence. – From my lodge, 5 August.

Gerard was soon engaged in stockpiling arms and ammunition. Supplies were handled by William Stanley, 6th Earl of Derby, second son of the old earl, with whom Gerard maintained a cordial correspondence, ensuring that he received monies already due. Thereafter Gerard ensured that payment was made in ready cash to the earl by his Comptroller, Humphrey Scarswick.

In March 1596 Essex commissioned Gerard to recruit a thousand men to serve in an Anglo-Dutch expedition to Cádiz, which set off from Plymouth in June. Gerard accompanied the expedition as colonel of a regiment of foot. The Capture of Cádiz was one of the most severe losses suffered by Spain in the war, with the city itself and the Spanish fleet destroyed. Gerard was not paid for his service but he had a small ship of his own, which he used for privateering. Over the next two years, he was involved in organising militia forces in Northamptonshire, Middlesex and Hertfordshire to guard against a possible Spanish invasion. In May 1597 Gerard was honoured with the post of Knight Marshal of the Household, deputy to Essex, the Earl Marshal.

In November 1597 Gerard was returned again to the House of Commons as member for Lancashire, although not before Molyneux, now High Sheriff of Lancashire, had his revenge for past slights by sending back the election writ to London on a technicality. Molyneux's position barred his standing, and Gerard's colleague this time was Robert Hesketh of Rufford Hall.

== Breach with Essex ==
It was the Irish war that finally split Gerard from the Essex faction. Essex was nominated for the post of Lord Lieutenant of Ireland by the Cecil faction, in the expectation that he would fail. Gerard travelled with Essex to Ireland in April 1599 and they stayed at his Staffordshire manor of Gerrard's Bromley together on the way. They reached Dublin on 15 April but Gerard left within five days. It is not clear what his duties, if any, had been in Ireland and he did not return. The Privy Council ordered Gerard to send supplies to Ireland from the Isle of Man, but he had no further dealings with Essex in Ireland. In April 1600 he was still attending to his duties in and around London, conducting the French ambassador to the coast to meet messengers from Henry IV, and keeping in close touch with Cecil.

When Essex returned to disgrace in May, Gerard left the court and headed for the country. It seems he had been accused of something, perhaps concerning his dealings with Essex, by Roger Manners, 5th Earl of Rutland, a strong supporter of Essex. Gerard wrote to Robert Cecil on 9 May in abject terms, seeking to explain his actions, although he had clearly panicked:

If my occasions to the country had not been great, I had attended you before my departure. Her Majesty charged me deeply at my coming away, and I vow before God, if I had been guilty, I would never have denied, and where it pleased her to name my Lord of Rutland for one of my accusers, I have sent her my Lord's own hand to the contrary, and if anyone that was with me at that time would ever have avowed it, I would have given good satisfaction to the contrary, but that particularly and before witness they have all freed me. How grievous it is unto me that I, who have so often and sundry times received her Majesty's gracious favour, should now be held so base and dishonest a servant as to equal any (in my love and duty to her), much more a man being but her subject and one that in his life never pleasured me, but in his love that he afforded to many others, [and] should now be condemned upon an unjust accusation. I refer to the secrets of a true heart, and therefore, as in this matter I was first beholden to you at Richmond, where it pleased you to deliver your mind frankly and honourably unto me, so I now most humbly crave your favour, as if by chance you hear her Majesty speak on me, to answer by your good word for me, which I will assure you by the reputation and credit of an honest man, that if I live, you shall fully find by my courses wherein I will give good satisfaction to make requital.

Gerard succeeded in creating enough distance between himself and Essex to resume his responsibilities within a few months. In July he wrote to Cecil asking that the Isle of Man garrison be paid in cash, not kind, to benefit the local economy, a measure suggested by George Lloyd, the Bishop of Sodor and Man.

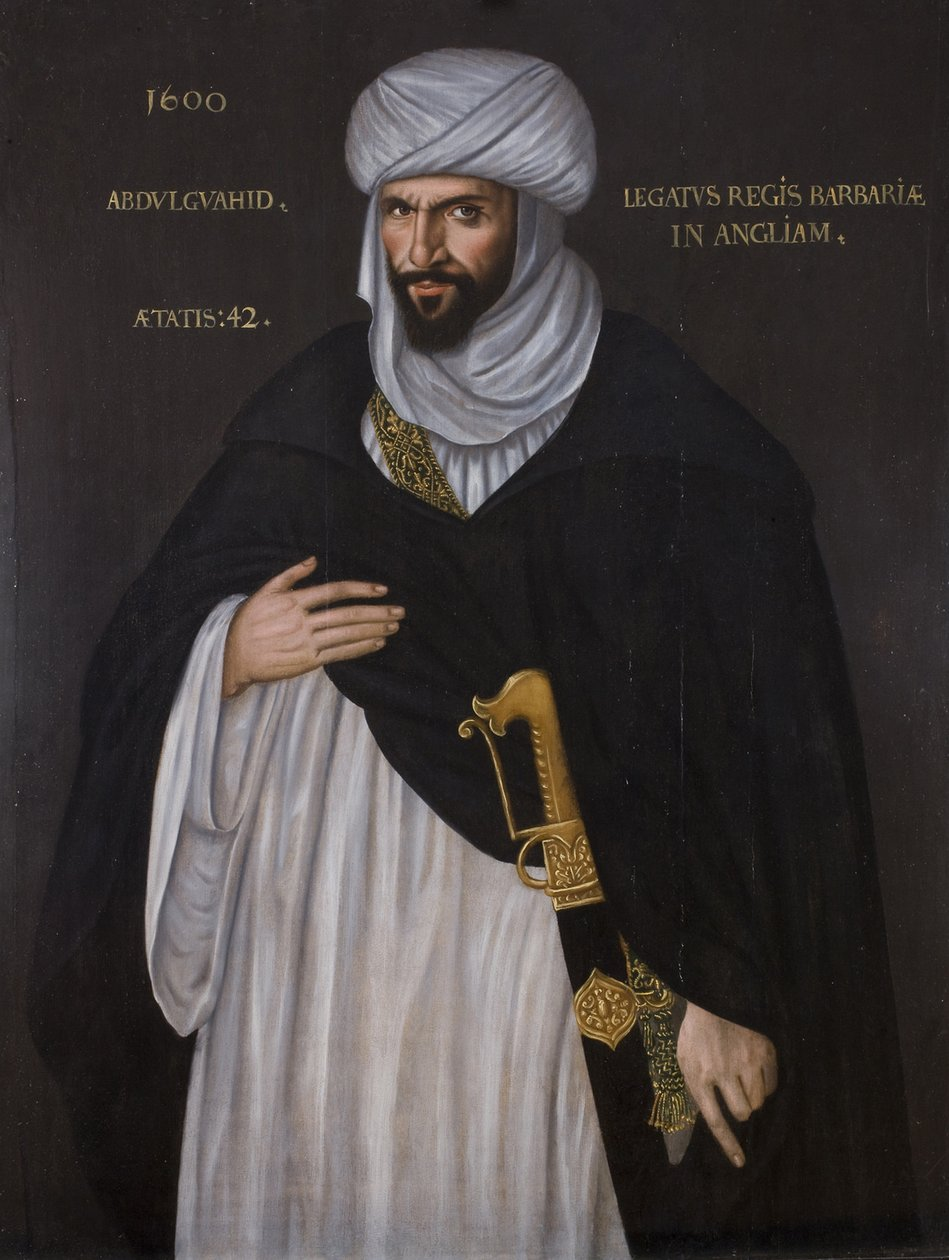
Abd el-Ouahed ben Messaoud ben Mohammed Anoun, Moorish Ambassador to Queen Elizabeth I. Gerard was responsible for ensuring his well-being during his stay.

In August 1600 Gerard was living in his house at Charing Cross and again carrying out diplomatic escort duties, this time looking after the travel and dietary arrangements of the man he called the "Barbery Embassador" [sic]. This was a sensitive and important task, entrusted to him by Cecil. England was in the process of cementing the Anglo-Moroccan alliance. The Sultan of Morocco, Ahmad al-Mansur, was an ally against Spain and a major commercial partner. Gerrard was deputed to arrange accommodation for Abd el-Ouahed ben Messaoud, the sultan's ambassador. On 11 August he wrote to Cecil to explain that he had arranged via the Lord Mayor of London to house the ambassador in Alderman Radclyffe's house. Three days later, Gerard rode down to Gravesend to make first contact with the Moroccan party, who were awaiting a favourable tide to carry them swiftly into the capital. Tactfully, he let them rest overnight before talking further, and then rode back to London to make sure they were fully provided for.

When the Essex Rebellion occurred in February 1601, Gerard was among the first to denounce it. It was he who handed over Essex, Rutland, and Southampton at the Tower of London on 9 February. In April both Gerard and Molyneux were put under suspicion by informers in the case of Thurston Hunt and Robert Middleton, two Lancashire Catholic priests who were executed, accusations that Molyneux angrily rebutted. Fortunately both were cleared by the evidence of Hunt himself.

Gerard was appointed Custos Rotulorum of Staffordshire in place of Essex sometime in 1601. In October of that year, he was easily returned to parliament as member for Staffordshire. The 1597 election scandal in Staffordshire had discredited Edward Sutton, 5th Baron Dudley, who had frustrated the parliamentary ambitions of Edward Littleton and Essex. With the Essex faction itself also cleared out of the way, Gerard was returned alongside Sir John Egerton, a relative of Thomas Egerton, 1st Viscount Brackley, the Lord Chancellor.

== Under James I ==
When James I came to the throne in 1603 Gerard was immediately accepted into the new king's favour. He was elevated to the peerage as Baron Gerard of Gerards Bromley. He was named as one of 13 peers allowed to enter the privy chamber. The king even visited Gerard's substantial house at Gerrard's Bromley. Another more frequent visitor was Robert Cecil, with whom Gerard pursued their interest in falconry.

In 1616 Gerard was appointed president of the Council of Wales and the Marches, which was based in Ludlow and had overall supervision of government in Wales, Shropshire, Herefordshire, Worcestershire and Gloucestershire. He also became Lord Lieutenant of Wales, a post associated with the presidency of the council. However, it appears that the office was essentially honorary. He stayed in London and did not exercise his authority in the field, resigning in 1617.

In fact, Gerard suspected his life was nearing its end and made his will on 6 October 1617. He now owned a very large amount of landed property and goods. He made large bequests to his younger sons, William and John, but mentioned nothing specific for his heir, Gilbert. His second wife was well provided for and he made smaller but still substantial bequests, including £50 for his servant Edward Lloyd. He asked for Christian burial, in the night without a funeral, in the chancel at Ashley, Staffordshire, a village about half a mile from Gerrard's Bromley, where his father had been buried. He died on 15 January 1618 and was buried in accordance with his wishes. A life-sized effigy, in a kneeling position, was placed behind his parents' tomb in the church.

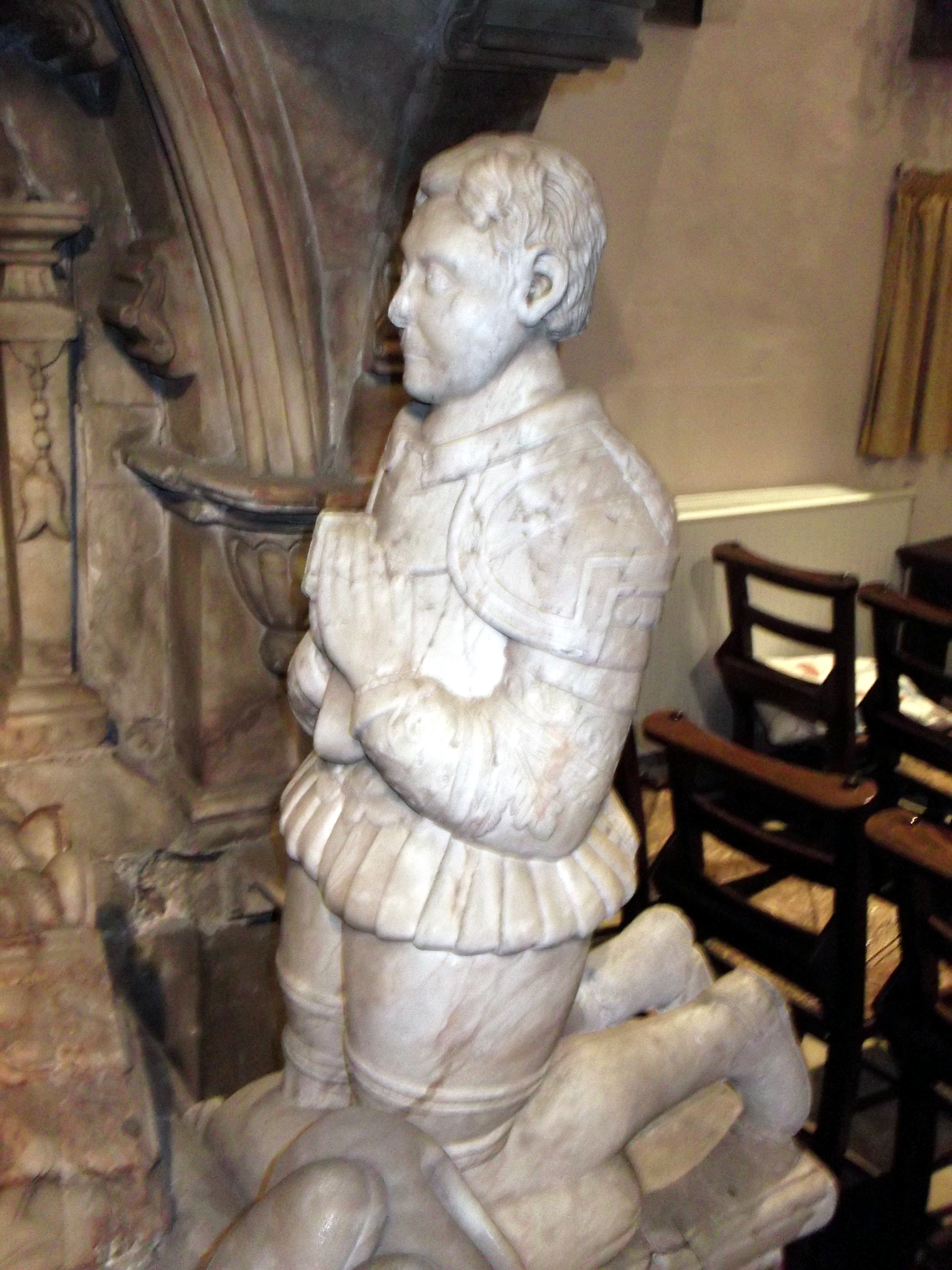
Gilbert, 2nd Baron Gerard (d. 1622). Gerard Chapel, Church of St John the Baptist, Ashley, Staffordshire.

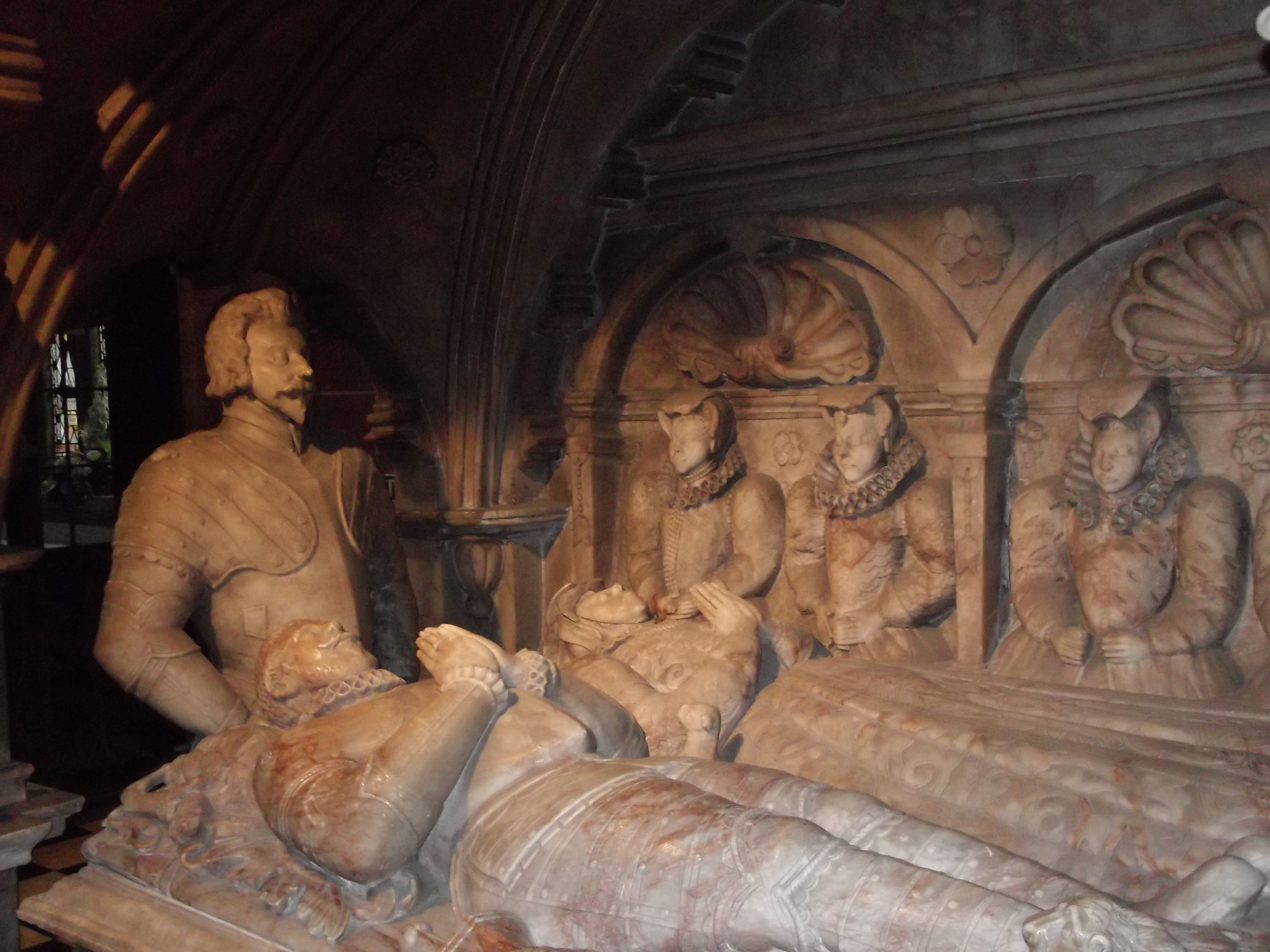
The Gerard Family: Thomas, 1st Baron Gerard (kneeling); Gilbert Gerard, Attorney General 1559–81; Anne Radcliffe. Gerard Memorial, Ashley.

== Marriages and family ==
Gerard married twice:

- Alice, daughter of Sir Thomas Rivet of Chippenham, was his first wife. They had three sons:

- Gilbert, Thomas's heir, who became the 2nd Baron Gerard (died 1622). He married Eleanor, daughter and heiress of Thomas Dutton of Dutton, Cheshire. They had children of whom four survived him.

- Dutton (1613-1640), who became 3rd Baron Gerard, married firstly, after 18 May 1625, Lady Mary Fane (1606-1634), daughter of Francis Fane, 1st Earl of Westmorland. Secondly, he married, on 21 August 1636, Lady Elisabeth O'Brien (d. 1656-1659), daughter of Henry O'Brien, 5th Earl of Thomond.
- Alice, who married Roger Owen.
- Frances (d. 1636), who married Robert Needham, 3rd Viscount Kilmorey (d. 1657), son of Robert Needham, 2nd Viscount Kilmorey.
- Elizabeth (d. 1679), who married, on 6 November 1642, Sir Peter Leycester, 1st Baronet of Nether Tablery, Cheshire.

- William.
- John.

- Elizabeth, daughter of Robert Woodford of Burnham, Buckinghamshire, was his second wife. The marriage seems to have been childless. After Gerard's death, Elizabeth married Patrick Ruthven, a member of the disgraced Scottish Ruthven family. They had three sons, including Patrick Ruthven (died 1667) who was a soldier in Swedish service. Their daughter Mary Ruthven (died 1645) was a maid of honour to Henrietta Maria. She married the painter Anthony van Dyck. He painted her portrait several times. Their daughter Justiniana van Dyck was baptised on the day the painter died, 9 December 1641.

== General references ==
- Burke, John (1831). A General and Heraldic Dictionary of the Peerages of England, Ireland, and Scotland, Extinct, Dormant, and in Abeyance. England. Vol. [1]: England. London: Henry Colburn and Richard Bentley. p. 219. OCLC 4645457.
- N. M. S. (1981). "Gerard, Thomas I (c. 1564–1618), of Gerrard's Bromley, Staffs., Astley, Lancs. and Charing Cross, London". In Hasler, P. W. (ed.). The History of Parliament: The House of Commons 1558–1603 – via History of Parliament Online.
- Roberts, R. A., ed. (1894). Calendar of the Cecil Papers in Hatfield House. Vol. 5: 1594–1595 – via British History Online.
- Roberts, R. A., ed. (1904). Calendar of the Cecil Papers in Hatfield House. Vol. 10: 1600 – via British History Online.
- Roberts, R. A., ed. (1906). Calendar of the Cecil Papers in Hatfield House. Vol. 11: 1601 – via British History Online.

Parliament of England
Preceded by Thomas Sadler; Henry Sadler	Member of Parliament for Lancaster; 1584–1588; With: Henry Sadler	Succeeded by Roger Dalton; John Atherton
Preceded by John Grey; William Bassett	Member of Parliament for Staffordshire; 1588–1589; With: Walter Harcourt	Succeeded by Sir Christopher Blount; Walter Harcourt
Preceded by John Atherton; Richard Holland	Member of Parliament for Lancashire; 1593–1601; With: Thomas Walmsley 1588–1589; Sir Richard Molyneux 1593–1597; Robert Hesketh 1597–1601	Succeeded by Sir Richard Hoghton; Thomas Hesketh
Preceded by Hon. John Dudley; Sir Christopher Blount	Member of Parliament for Staffordshire; 1601–1603; With: Sir John Egerton	Succeeded by Sir Edward Littleton; Robert Stanford
Political offices
Preceded by The Lord Eure	Lord President of Wales; Lord Lieutenant of Wales (less Glamorgan and Monmouthshire), Herefordshire, Shropshire and Worcestershire; 1617	Succeeded by The Lord Compton
Preceded by The 2nd Earl of Essex	Custos Rotulorum of Staffordshire; 1601 – aft. 1608	Succeeded by The 3rd Earl of Essex
Peerage of England
New creation	Baron Gerard; 1603–1618	Succeeded by Gilbert Gerard
