= Edward Ward, 7th Baron Dudley =

English peer

Edward Ward, 7th Baron Dudley and 2nd Baron Ward (1631–1701) succeeded his father, Humble Ward as the 2nd Baron Ward in 1670 and his mother, Frances Ward as 7th Baron Dudley in 1697. He married Frances Brereton, the daughter of the Parliamentary General, Sir William Brereton. He died on 3 August 1701 and was buried at Himley.

== Life ==
Edward Ward was born in 1631 to Humble Ward, the son of a wealthy goldsmith, and Frances Ward, the heir apparent to the Barony of Dudley. Edward's mother became 6th Baroness of Dudley on 24 June 1643 and his father was created Baron Ward of Birmingham by King Charles I on 23 March 1644. Edward married Frances Brereton, the daughter of the Parliamentary General, Sir William Brereton, 1st Baronet. Edward succeeded his father to become 2nd Baron Ward on 14 October 1670, taking his seat in the House of Lords as Lord Ward on 5 December 1670. He succeeded his mother in August 1697 to become 7th Baron Dudley, taking his seat in the House of Lords as Lord Dudley on 28 January 1698. He died on 3 August 1701 and was buried at Himley.

Peerage of England
Preceded by Frances Ward	Baron Dudley; 1697–1701	Succeeded by Edward Ward
Preceded by Humble Ward	Baron Ward; 1670-1701	Succeeded by Edward Ward
