= William Ward (goldsmith) =

English goldsmith and financier

William Ward was an English goldsmith and financier from London, involved in the manufacture of glass.

He was the youngest son of Edward Ward of Bixley in Norfolk and Anne Havers, a daughter of John Havers of Winfarthing and Thelveton. Sir Edward Ward was his nephew or great-nephew.

In 1598, Ward was an apprentice of Christopher Wace, a goldsmith in Cheapside. He took over Wace's business, and supplied jewels to Henrietta Maria. In December 1627 he sold her a tablet or locket costing £700 to be a gift to the ambassador from Mantua.

He and one of his brothers (whose name is not recorded) was involved in a setting up a glass house in Scotland in 1617. A Venetian glassmaker, John Maria de Aqua, was invited to work in Scotland by Agmondesham Pickayes, he left the employ of Sir Robert Mansell, and his expenses were paid by William Ward. In January 1620 Ward was required to defend himself from the charge of seducing dell' Aqua from Mansell's employment.

After the death of George Heriot he purchased some of his stock of jewels, so contributing to the foundation of Heriot's Hospital in Edinburgh. The sale was arranged by John Hay (died 1654).

Ward lived in Southwark and was a member of the vestry, bequeathing in his will £6 for a vestry dinner.

== Marriages and family ==
William Ward married Elizabeth Humble (died 1616), daughter of Richard Humble, a leatherseller. Their children included:

- Humble Ward (born 1612), who married Frances Sutton (1611-1697) in 1628. Her aunt, Mary Sutton, Countess of Home resided in Edinburgh. According to William Dugdale, her grandfather Edward Sutton, 5th Baron Dudley arranged her marriage to Ward to alleviate his debts, which were large because of the expenses of his relationship with Elizabeth Tomlinson.

Ward married secondly, Rose Rogers. Her sister Katherine was the mother of John Harvard, a founder of Harvard University
