= Lord Lieutenant of Wales =

Defunct office position (until 1689)

The Lord Lieutenant of Wales was an office associated with the Lord President of the Council of Wales and the Marches until the abolition of that body in 1689. The Lord Presidents of Wales were also Lord Lieutenants of Wales, except for the years 1602–1629, when the county of Glamorgan (as well as the Marcher county of Monmouthshire) formed a separate lieutenancy. Before the English Civil War, the Lord Presidents were also Lord Lieutenant of Herefordshire, Monmouthshire, Shropshire and Worcestershire, except as mentioned above; however, this practice did not continue after the English Restoration in 1660.

The last Lord President, Charles Gerard, 1st Earl of Macclesfield, retained the Lord-Lieutenancy of all Wales until his death in 1694, when the counties of North Wales were placed under William Stanley, 9th Earl of Derby and South Wales under Thomas Herbert, 8th Earl of Pembroke.

== Lord Lieutenants of Wales ==
Years	Lord Lieutenant
24 February 1587 – 19 January 1601	Henry Herbert, 2nd Earl of Pembroke (including Herefordshire, Monmouthshire, Shropshire and Worcestershire)
20 July 1602 – 12 September 1607	Edward la Zouche, 11th Baron Zouche (less Glamorgan; including Herefordshire, Shropshire and Worcestershire)
12 September 1607 – 7 March 1617	Ralph Eure, 3rd Baron Eure (less Glamorgan; including Herefordshire, Shropshire and Worcestershire)
7 March 1617 – 24 November 1617	Thomas Gerard, 1st Baron Gerard (less Glamorgan; including Herefordshire, Shropshire and Worcestershire)
24 November 1617 – 24 June 1630	William Compton, 1st Earl of Northampton (less Glamorgan until 1629; including Herefordshire, Shropshire and Worcestershire, and Monmouthshire after 1629)
11 July 1631 – 1642	John Egerton, 1st Earl of Bridgewater
Interregnum
22 December 1660 – 20 July 1672	Richard Vaughan, 2nd Earl of Carbery
20 July 1672 – 22 March 1689	Henry Somerset, 1st Duke of Beaufort
22 March 1689 – 7 January 1694	Charles Gerard, 1st Earl of Macclesfield
separated into North Wales and South Wales
