= John Sutton, 3rd Baron Dudley =

English nobleman

The Right Honourable John Sutton
- Baron Dudley
- Predecessor: Sir Edward Sutton, 2nd Baron Dudley
- Successor: Sir Edward Sutton, 4th Baron Dudley
- Born: 1494; Dudley Castle, Worcestershire
- Died: 1553 (aged 58–59); Middlesex
- Buried: 21 September 1553; St. Margaret's, Westminster
- Wars and battles: War of the League of Cambrai
- Noble family: Sutton
- Spouse: Lady Cecily Grey
- Issue: 8, including Edward, Henry
- Parents: Edward Sutton, 2nd Baron Dudley; Cicely Willoughby

John Sutton, 3rd Baron Dudley (c. 1494 –1553), commonly known as Lord Quondam, was an English nobleman.

== Early life ==
John Sutton was born in 1494, at Dudley Castle, Worcestershire, the eldest son and heir of Sir Edward Sutton, 2nd Baron Dudley and his wife Cicely (née Willoughby) Sutton. Cecily was a daughter of Sir William Willoughby and Joan Strangeways, and granddaughter of Katherine Neville, Duchess of Norfolk.

John Sutton had several younger brothers: Thomas, William, Arthur, Geoffery and George. Among his sisters were Hon. Eleanor Sutton (wife of Charles Somerset, 1st Earl of Worcester, and Leonard Grey, 1st Viscount Grane), Hon. Jane Sutton (wife of Sir Thomas Fiennes and mother of Thomas Fiennes, 9th Baron Dacre), and Hon. Margaret Sutton (wife of John Grey, 2nd Baron Grey of Powis).

== Career ==
Sutton was a soldier and was with Henry VIII in France in 1513, fighting in War of the Holy League with Spain against France. He was knighted on 13 October that year.

He succeeded his father, Edward Sutton, 2nd Baron Dudley, as Baron Dudley in 1532. He was already very much in debt at this time, he and his father having already borrowed money as early as 1512, and immediately began to sell his patrimony, including half of Powis Castle. His father had already sold most of the Sutton interest in the barony of Malpas in 1521, as well as Northfield in 1531. Sutton sold the rest to Sir Rowland Hill in 1537. The barony of Malpas had been held by the Sutton family since about 1270, when Isabel Patrick married Richard de Sutton. He sold the manor of Oxley in Staffordshire to James Levison in 1533.

In 1532, immediately after his succession as Baron Dudley, Sutton also borrowed £2000 against his estates from his cousin, the Earl of Warwick and future Duke of Northumberland John Dudley, with a £400 yearly repayment. Sutton wrote to Thomas Cromwell, then serving as a member of the King's Privy Council, that year asking him to use his influence with the King to persuade him to pay the £2000 in exchange for the £180 per year rent for the manor of Sedgley for 20 years. Sutton wrote again to Cromwell in 1533 asking him to pay the £400 yearly repayment. This was apparently unsuccessful and Sutton sold the manor and castle of Dudley to his cousin in 1535. It appears Cromwell lent Sutton £1000 some time before 1538-9

Sutton acquired the derogatory nickname "Lord Quondam" ('Lord Has-been' or 'Lord Formerly') after allowing his estate, including the castle of Dudley, to fall into the possession of his cousin.

There is much evidence in James Gairdner's Letters and Papers of the Reign of Henry VIII to suggest that Sutton's cousin, John Dudley, and Cromwell between them colluded to entangle Lord Dudley before the fact, and did not simply take advantage of him afterwards, as suggested by Dugdale's sources. Cromwell had long been friends with Cecily Grey and her family, having served as her father's advisor in 1523, and bought out Baron Dudley's lands to help save her family from ruin.

Sutton's wife, Lady Cecily, Baroness Dudley, wrote to the Lord Privy Seal (Cromwell) on 24 February 1538, describing the effect of her family's loss of income:

"The cause of my writing unto you is, desiring you to be good lord unto me; it is so, as you know very well, that by the means of my lord, my husband, I and all mine are utterly undone, unless it be the better provided by the Grace of God, and likewise that it may please the King's highness to take pity of me and mine. . . The truth is, I have little above twenty pound a year, (which I have by my lady my mother,) to find me and one of my daughters with a woman and a man to wait upon me; and surely, unless the good prioress of Nuneaton did give me meat and drink of free cost, to me and all mine that here remains with me, I could not tell what shift to make. Over and besides that, whensoever any of my children comes hither to see me, they be welcome unto the prioress as long as they list to tarry, horsemeat and man's meat, and cost them nothing, with a piece of gold or two in their purses at their departure."

Northumberland resided for many years at Dudley Castle and added new and magnificent structures to the old fortress. In 1675, the historian, William Dugdale, wrote of Sutton's sale of Dudley Castle to his cousin:

"It is reported by credible tradition of this John Lord Dudley, that being a man of weak understanding, whereby he had exposed himself to some wants, and so became entangled in the usurer's bonds, John Dudley, then Viscount Lisle and Earl of Warwick (afterwards Duke of Northumberland), thirsting after Dudley Castle, the chief seat of the family, made those money merchants his instruments to work him out of it, which by some mortgage being at length effected, this poor lord became exposed to the charity of his friends for a subsistence, and spending the remainder of his life in visits amongst them, was commonly called the Lord Quondam."

Lord Dudley was never summoned to Parliament.

== Personal life ==
By 30 October 1501, he was betrothed to Lady Cecily Grey (c.1497-1554), a daughter of Thomas Grey, 1st Marquess of Dorset, by Cecily Bonville, his wife, suo jure Baroness Harington and Baroness Bonville. Lady Cecily was the grand-daughter of the former Queen, Elizabeth Woodville. They subsequently married and Lord Dudley and Lady Cecily were the parents of at least nine children, several of whom were directly involved on both sides in the conflicts and turmoil surrounding the English Reformation:

- Edward Sutton, 4th Baron Dudley (c. 1515–1586), who married one of Queen Mary I's Gentlewomen of the Privy Chamber, Catherine Brydges, the daughter of John Brydges, 1st Baron Chandos, in 1556. After her death in 1566, he married Lady Jane Stanley, a daughter of Edward Stanley, 3rd Earl of Derby, in 1567. After her death, he married Mary Howard, the daughter of William Howard, 1st Baron Howard in 1571.
- Hon. Sir Henry Sutton Dudley (1517–1568), a diplomat who was a conspirator of the Tudor period against Queen Mary; he married Anne Ashton, daughter of Sir Christopher Ashton and step-daughter of Lady Catherine Gordon. Sir Christopher also plotted against Queen Mary.
- Hon. George Sutton, a soldier at Calais who plotted against Queen Elizabeth I.
- Hon. Maud Sutton, who married Ralph Josceline.
- Hon. Margaret Sutton, who married William Guibon of Watlington, Norfolk.
- Hon. Thomas Sutton (1539–1574), who married and had issue.
- Hon. Dorothy Sutton.
- Hon. Elizabeth Sutton.
- Hon. Robert Sutton.

After losing Dudley Castle in 1537, Sutton, who retained the title Baron Dudley, moved to his city residence at Tothill Street in Westminster, which his father had been hiring since 1522. He died in Middlesex and was buried on 18 September 1553 in St Margaret's, Westminster, London; Cecily, Baroness Dudley, was also buried there on 28 April 1554. Accounts of his funeral were given by the diarist Henry Machyn:

"Sir John Dudley was buried at Westminster, Sept. 21st 1553, the backside of St. Margaret's. His crest a blue lion's head standing upon a crown of gold"

And a transcript of a contemporary account published by John Strype in his Memorials:

"Sir John Dudley, baron of Dudley, happening to die at Westminster, his obsequies were celebrated on the 21st of September, honourably; but with the odd, popish ceremonies; that is to say, priests and clerks going before and singing in Latin. Then a priest wearing a cope, then a clerk, having the holy water-sprinkle in hand. After, a mourner bearing this lord's standard. After him, another bearing his great banner of arms, gold, and silver; another bearing his helmet, mantle and crest, a blue lion's head, standing upon a crown of gold. After, another mourner, bearing his target and another his sword. Next came Mr. Somerset, the herald, with his coat armour of gold and silver. And then the corse, covered with cloth of gold to the ground, and four of his men, bearing him, his arms hanging upon the cloth of gold; and twelve men, of his servants, carrying twelve staff-torches burning, to the church. In the quire was a horse made of timber, covered with black and arms up the black. And after, came the mourners, making a great company. After the dirge began, the herald came to the choir door, and prayed for his soul by his style. And so the dirge-song began in Latin and all the lessons. And then the herald prayed for a soul-mass. And so the mass was sung in Latin. And after, this noblemen's helmet, coat and target were offered. And, after all ended, the standard and banner of arms were offered, and so the company repaired to the house whence they set out. Then followed the ringing of bells and a great dole."

His cousin and nemesis John Dudley, Duke of Northumberland was executed on 22 August the same year, 1553, after plotting to install Lady Jane Grey on the English throne. After Northumberland's execution, Dudley Castle was forfeited to the crown, and in 1555 was restored by Queen Mary to Lord Dudley's eldest son, Edward Sutton, 4th Baron Dudley and his wife, Catherine Brydges.

Peerage of England
Preceded by Edward Sutton	Baron Dudley; 1532–1553	Succeeded by Edward Sutton
