= Edward Sutton, 4th Baron Dudley =

English nobleman and soldier (1515–1586)

- Predecessor: John Sutton, 3rd Baron Dudley
- Successor: Edward Sutton, 5th Baron Dudley
- Born: Circa 1515
- Died: July 12, 1586 (aged 70–71)
- Buried: St. Margaret's Church, Westminster
- Noble family: Sutton
- Spouses: Katherine Brydges, Jane Stanley, Mary Howard
- Issue: Anne Sutton, Edward Sutton, 5th Baron Dudley, John Sutton
- Father: John Sutton, 3rd Baron Dudley
- Mother: Lady Cicely Grey
- Occupation: Military officer, governor

Edward Sutton, 4th Baron Dudley (circa 1515 – 12 July 1586). The oldest son and heir of John Sutton, 3rd Baron Dudley. He was an English nobleman and soldier. Contemporary sources also refer to him as Sir Edward Dudley.

== Early life ==
Sir Edward was born around 1515 and was the eldest child and heir of John Sutton, 3rd Baron Dudley and Lady Cicely Grey, daughter of Thomas Grey, 1st Marquess of Dorset; and the paternal grandson of Edmund Sutton, Knight of Dudley Castle and Baron Tibertot and Cherleton and maternal great-grandson of Elizabeth Woodville, former Queen consort of England.

== Career ==
Sir Edward served in Ireland in 1536 under his uncle Leonard Grey, 1st Viscount Grane. He was made a captain of a company of 100 archers, under Sir William Brereton and on recommendation from Thomas Cromwell. In 1538 his uncle wrote to Cromwell: "I beseech your lordship to be good lord unto my poor nephew Dudley." The young Sir Edward was referred to as very poor by himself and his uncle, his father had lost his estate and Dudley Castle in 1537. He served in Ireland until 1538.

He joined an expedition to Scotland in 1547, where he became governor of Hume Castle after its capture by the English forces. He wrote to the Earl of Shrewsbury from Hume on 11 September 1547 about the capture of the English Berwick Pursuivant, Henry Ray, and signed the letter "E. Duddeley". Hume was retaken by the Scots in December 1548, and Sutton captured. He was held at Spynie Palace. At the end of the war, on 28 March 1550, the Earl of Shrewsbury was asked by the Privy Council to organise his release by the exchange of French hostages to the value of £200.

On the 17th of September 1553, Sutton succeeded his father (known as the "Lord Quondam" that is 'Lord Formerly') as Baron Dudley, and on the 2nd of October 1553, Sir Edward was knighted by Queen Mary I. He was called to Parliament in 1554 as Baron of Dudley and was restored to ownership of his ancestral Dudley Castle, which had been forfeited to the Crown by the attainder of his cousin the Duke of Northumberland.

He was lieutenant of Hampnes, in Picardy, from 1556 to 1558, though the appointment appears to have been made in 1554 and was for life. He abandoned Hampnes in 1558, fearing the French and fled to Flanders with his garrison. Ambrose Dudley, 3rd Earl of Warwick, wrote to Lord Robert Dudley and Sir William Cecil in 1562 about Sir Edward:

"Edward Dudley was the first that entered Tankerville and is there, as I understand, very well liked by the gentlemen of the country, and also those that serve with him."

Upon the accession of Queen Elizabeth 1558, he sought to gain her favour, and entertained her at Dudley Castle, 1575.

== Personal life ==
In 1553, the first year of the Catholic Queen Mary I of England, Sir Edward buried his father, Sir John "Quondam" Sutton, with Catholic rites. In 1554 Queen Mary granted him the manors of Horborne, the Priory of Dudley, and titles of Northfield and Sedgley, with lands and rights in Dudley, Tressel and Cradley.

After an early unsuccessful marriage proposal to a widow, a certain Anne, lady Berkeley, Sir Edward was married three times and had three children:

1. Catherine Brydges (m. 1556, d.1566), a Gentlewoman of the Privy Chamber to Queen Mary, and the daughter of John Brydges, 1st Baron Chandos and Elizabeth (née Grey) of Wilton; they had one child:

- Anne (b. c. 1556, d. 1605), who married first Francis Throckmorton, conspirator against Queen Elizabeth I of England and had issue, and second Thomas Wylmer Esq., barrister at law and had issue.

Queen Mary settled upon Edward and Catherine and their heirs the "... lordships of Sedgley, Himley and Swinford, the hays, forests and chases of Ashwood and Chaspell, and the lands called Willingsworth, in Sedgley, with divers lands and tenements in Himley, Wombourne and Swindon." With another grant in 1554, Queen Mary gave them and their male heirs Dudley Castle, Conigre Park and lands in Dudley, Fowley and Sedgley, which had been John Dudley's, Duke of Northumberland, and confiscated by the crown on his death in 1553. The grant was confirmed by Queen Elizabeth in 1579.

2. Jane Stanley, a daughter of Edward Stanley, 3rd Earl of Derby (m. 1567) with whom he had the following children:

- Edward Dudley, who became the 5th Baron Dudley (b. 17 September 1567, d. 23 June 1643).
- John Dudley (b. 30 November 1569, d. c. Feb 1644/45).

3. Mary Howard, the daughter of William, 1st Baron Howard on 16 December 1571 at Whitehall Palace in a triple wedding with Edward de Vere, 17th Earl of Oxford and bride, Anne Cecil, and Edward Somerset, 4th Earl of Worcester and bride Elizabeth Hastings. The year after Edward's death, Mary remarried to Richard Mompesson (d. 1627), courtier and briefly Member of Parliament. She died in 1600 and is buried in St Margaret's Church, Westminster.

In 1567, Sir Edward negotiated a prenuptial article of agreement for his daughter Anne, with Sir John Throckmorton for her to marry his eldest son and future conspirator, Francis Throckmorton. As part of this agreement, Anne was sent to be brought up by her future mother-in-law, Margery Throckmorton and the manors of Sedgley, Swinford and Himley and all other lands granted to Edward Sutton, Lord of Dudley by Philip and Mary were part of the dowry. Anne's maternal aunt, Mary Brydges, was married to George Throckmorton, John's brother and Francis' uncle. Anne and Francis had a son, John. After Francis was executed for treason in 1584, Anne married the Oxford educated barrister and member of Lincoln's Inn Thomas Wylmer Esq.

Sir Edward's will was dated 8 July 1586 and mentions his ironworks and a large debt load, so large that he allowed his executors 21 years in which to discharge them using profits from his stock and iron manufacturers.

He was buried at St. Margaret's Church, Westminster on 12 August 1586 and was succeeded by his son, Edward Sutton, 5th Baron Dudley (1567–1643).

== Notes ==
Attribution

This article incorporates text from a publication now in the public domain: "Dudley, John de". Dictionary of National Biography. London: Smith, Elder & Co. 1885–1900.

Peerage of England
Preceded by John Sutton	Baron Dudley; 1553–1586	Succeeded by Edward Sutton
