= Edward Littleton (died 1610) =

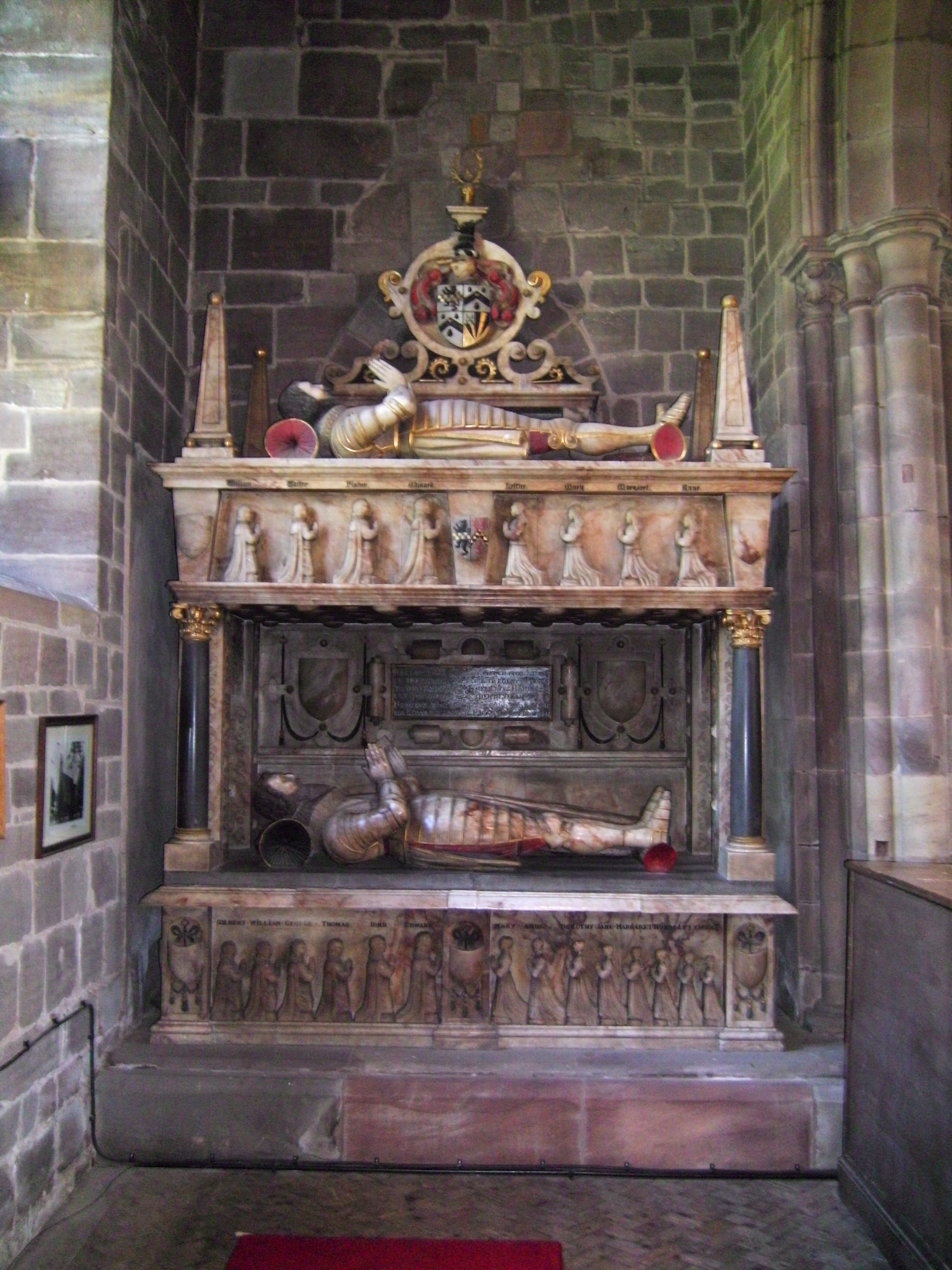
Tomb of two Sir Edward Littletons, father and son. East wall of north chancel aisle. Lower stage: Sir Edward Littleton (d. 1610) and his wife, Margaret Devereux. Upper stage: Sir Edward (d. 1629), and his wife, Mary Fisher. Their son, also Sir Edward, became the first baronet in 1627.

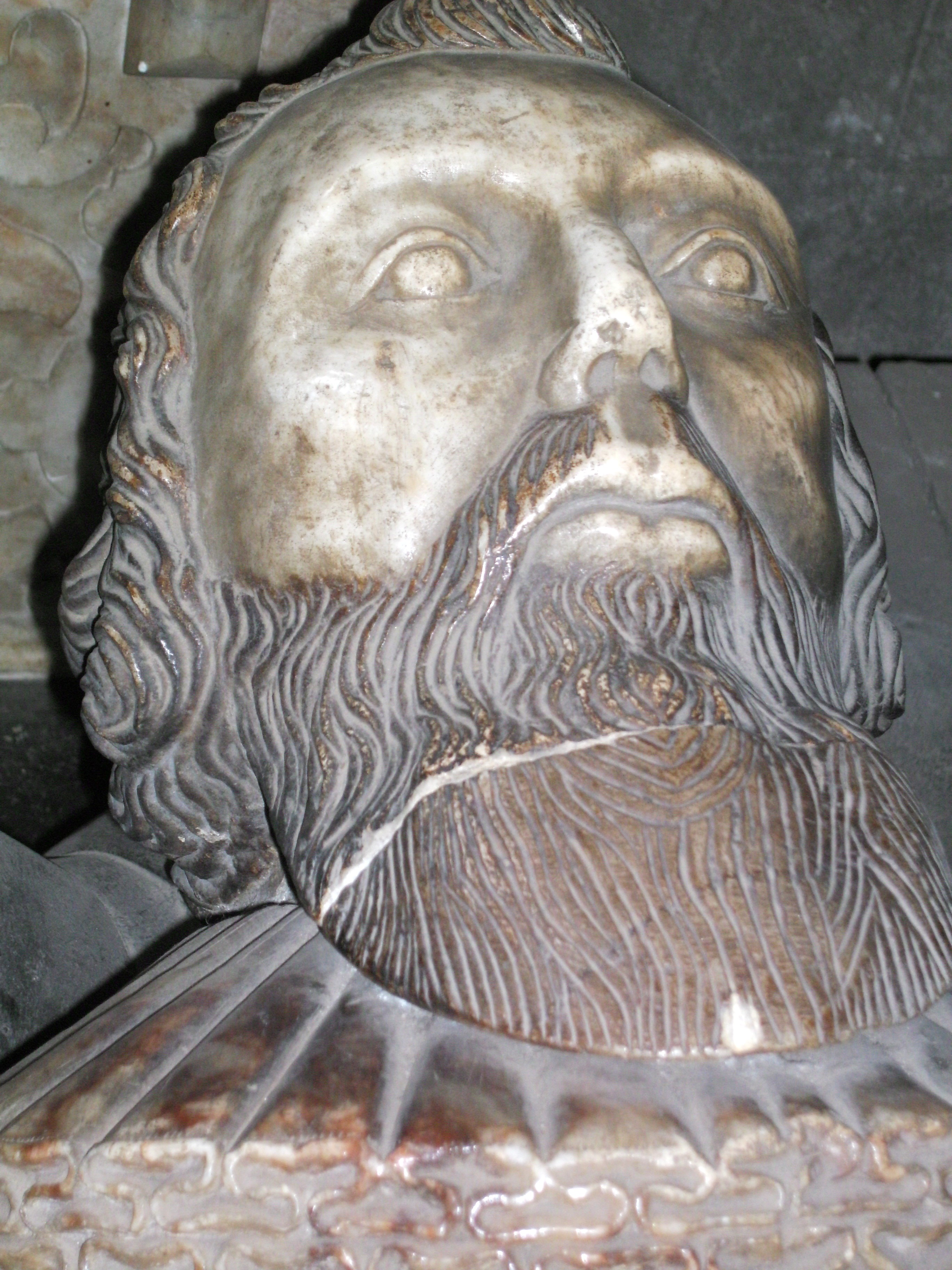
Sir Edward Littleton, who succeeded in 1574 and died in 1610, as portrayed on a double tomb in St. Michael's church, Penkridge.

Sir Edward Littleton (ca. 1555 – 1610) was a Staffordshire landowner, politician and rebel from the extended Littleton/Lyttelton family. A supporter of Robert Devereux, 2nd Earl of Essex, he was the victim of a notorious electoral fraud in 1597 and a participant in the Essex Rebellion, although he escaped with his life. In the reign of James I he was elected a member of the parliament of England.

== Background ==
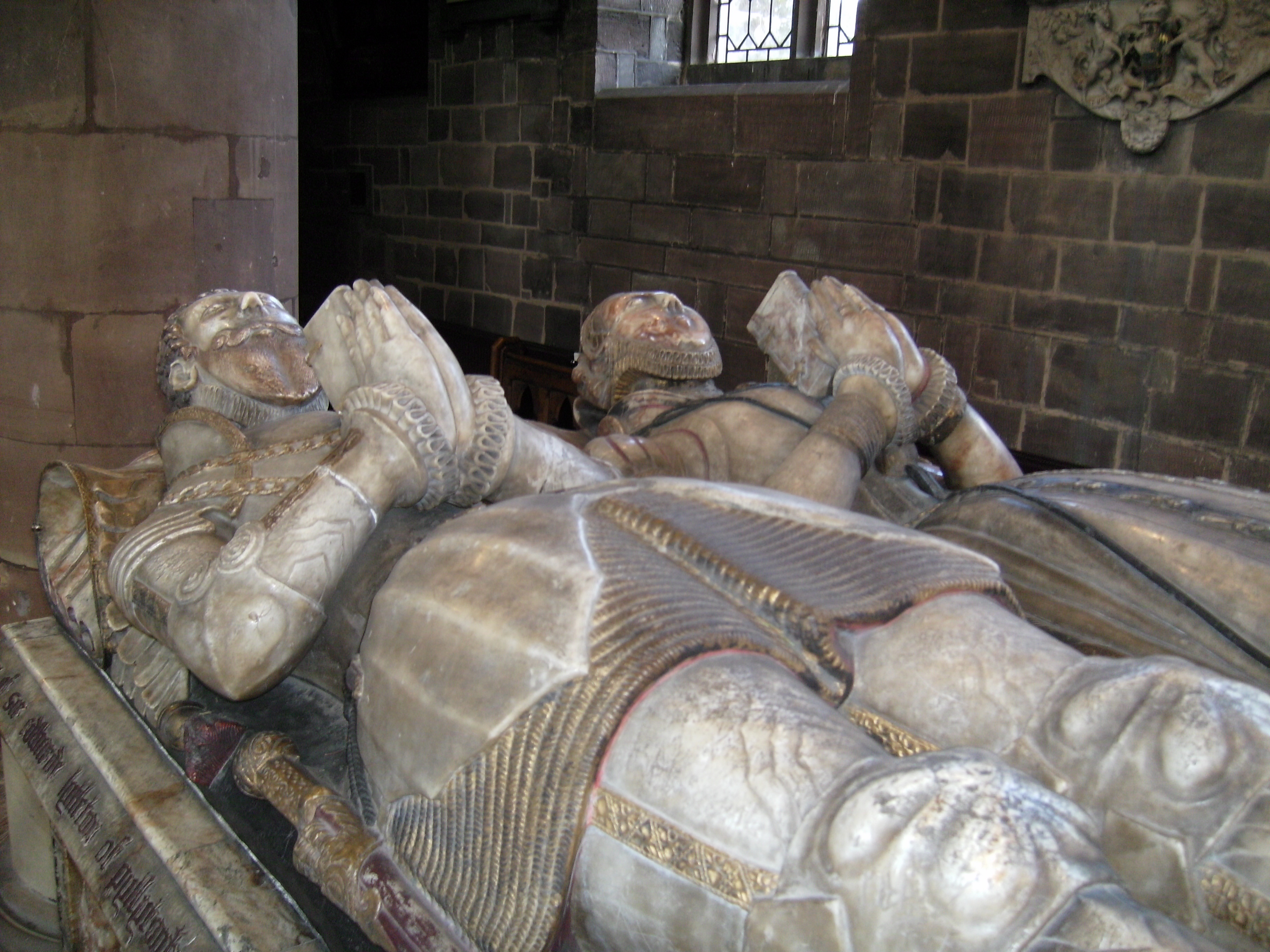
Tomb of Littleton's parents, Sir Edward Littleton (died 1574) and Alice Cockayne, in St. Michael's church, Penkridge.

Littleton's father was Edward Littleton (died 1574) of Pillaton Hall, near Penkridge. His mother was Alice Cockayne (1535–1602), the daughter of Francis Cockayne of Ashbourne Hall, Derbyshire.

The Littletons had been based at Pillaton since the early years of the century. Littleton's grandfather, Sir Edward Littleton, had skilfully and aggressively expanded the estates of his family during the turbulent years of the English Reformation and had represented Staffordshire in five parliaments. His father had consolidated the family's holdings but had been content mainly to live the life of a country gentleman.

== Landowner ==
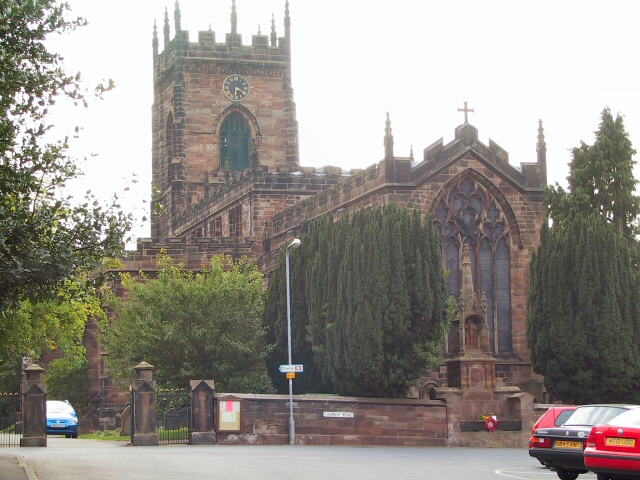
Penkridge parish church today. Littleton bought its property outright, acquiring numerous rights of the former royal peculiar.

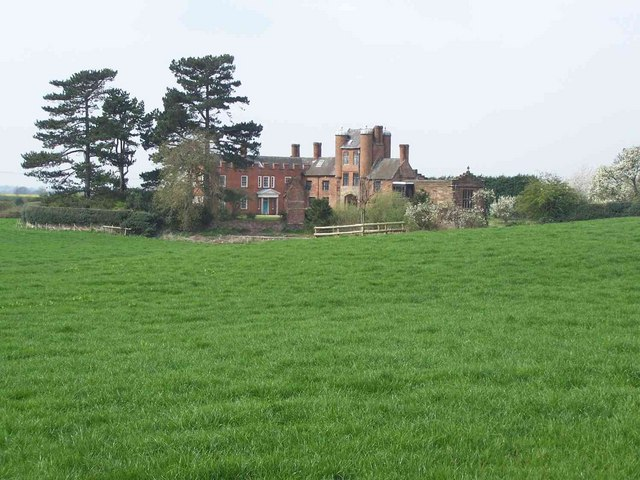
Remains of Pillaton Old Hall, near Penkridge, Staffordshire.

Littleton succeeded to the family estates in 1574, on the death of his father. He had married Margaret Devereux only recently, the marriage settlement dated 23 March 1573. Littleton inherited 16,000 acres in the Penkridge area and another 600 elsewhere in Staffordshire, 1,400 acres in Warwickshire, 900 acres in Shropshire and 940 acres in Worcestershire. His mother survived until 1602 and her jointure, a third of the estate, was, he later claimed, a major drain on his wealth, as was the property held in tail by his siblings. His mother's jointure was certainly large: it included all of the Warwickshire and Shropshire estates, as well as lands in Staffordshire. However, the death of his father-in-law, Sir William Devereux, in 1579 probably eased matters considerably, as Devereux left considerable legacies to his daughters. Certainly Littleton was sufficiently prominent and wealthy to serve two terms as High Sheriff of Staffordshire in 1581 and 1593. His subsidy assessment rose from only £5 in 1576 to £20 in 1590 and he could afford to settle an allowance of £100 on his eldest son, also Edward, at his marriage in 1599. By any standards, he was actually a large and wealthy landowner, of considerable regional importance.

Whatever the calls on his wealth, Littleton was able to find the money to make strategic investments when the opportunity arose. One of the most important sources of the Littletons' wealth were the leases they held, particularly that on the lands of the former college of St. Michael, Penkridge. Littleton's grandfather had taken out an 80-year lease on the lands of the deanery in 1543 – four years before the collegiate church was turned into a local parish church by the dissolution of chantries in 1547. The reversion was held briefly by John Dudley, 1st Duke of Northumberland during his period of power in the reign of Edward VI, but it returned to the Crown after his execution under Mary I in 1553. In 1581 the college, "with all its rights, members, lands, tithes, and appurtenances" was sold by the Crown to a pair of speculators: Edmund Downynge, a former MP with close Exchequer links, and Peter Aysheton. The sale of reversions and monopolies were essential forms of patronage exercised by the Crown in Elizabeth's reign, giving the government a stream of revenue outside parliamentary control. In 1583 the estate was sold to John Morley, another MP involved in the Exchequer, and a Thomas Crompton – probably the Thomas Crompton (died 1608) who was a London businessman and academic and had family land at Stafford. In 1585 Edward Littleton was able to buy the college property from John Morley, Elizabeth his wife, and Thomas Crompton. This land, described as the liberty of the deanery in 1598 and later as the deanery manor, was part of the Littleton estates until at least the 19th century. With it came many of the rights and duties of the college itself, including the jurisdiction of the royal peculiar. This gave the Littletons advowson of the church and kept the parish out of the Diocese of Lichfield until 1858.

Many of the Littleton's estates were still held by feudal land tenure. The fundamental bond of feudal society, the fief in return for military service, was obsolete, but the Littletons still paid 16 shillings a year to their overlord, Baron Paget, for Pillaton manor.

== Political career ==
=== The Paget connection ===
In the decade following his succession, Littleton seems to have been in the political camp of his overlord, Thomas Paget, 3rd Baron Paget, a prominent Catholic nobleman. However, in the 1580s Lord Paget, together with his brother Charles took refuge in France under the protection of the Catholic League. They were implicated in the Babington Plot, a conspiracy to assassinate Elizabeth I. Lord Paget was attainted, losing all his estates, and took refuge in Spain.

Littleton had supported Paget locally but had never sympathised with his religious views and seems not to have been harmed by Paget's demise. Amias Paulet, unimpeachably puritan and the gaoler of Mary, Queen of Scots, regarded Littleton as one of the few trustworthy Staffordshire gentry and described him as "a very honest religious gentleman".

=== The Devereux faction in Staffordshire ===
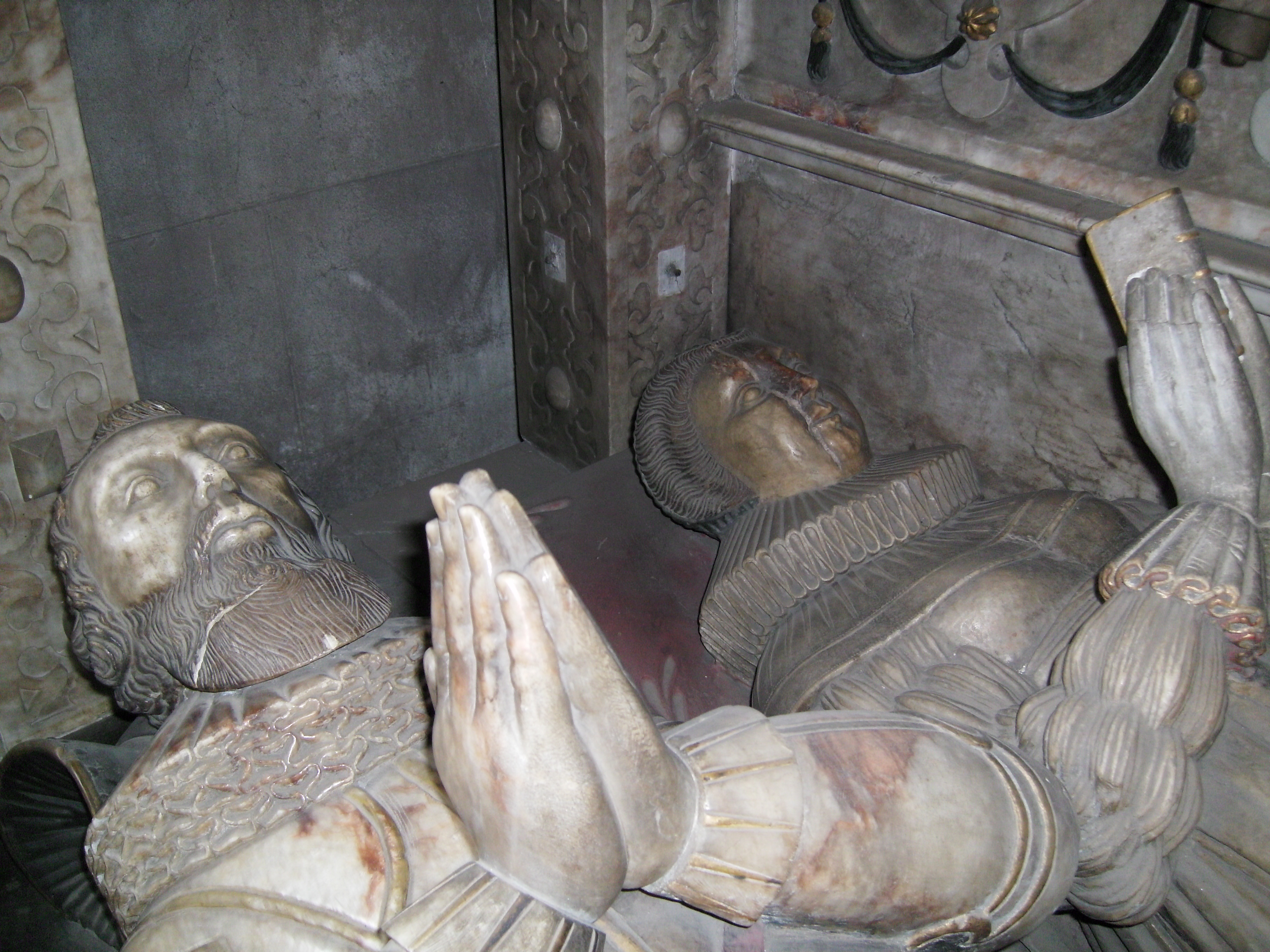
Littleton and his wife, Margaret Devereux, from the double tomb. Margaret was the cousin of the Earl of Essex.

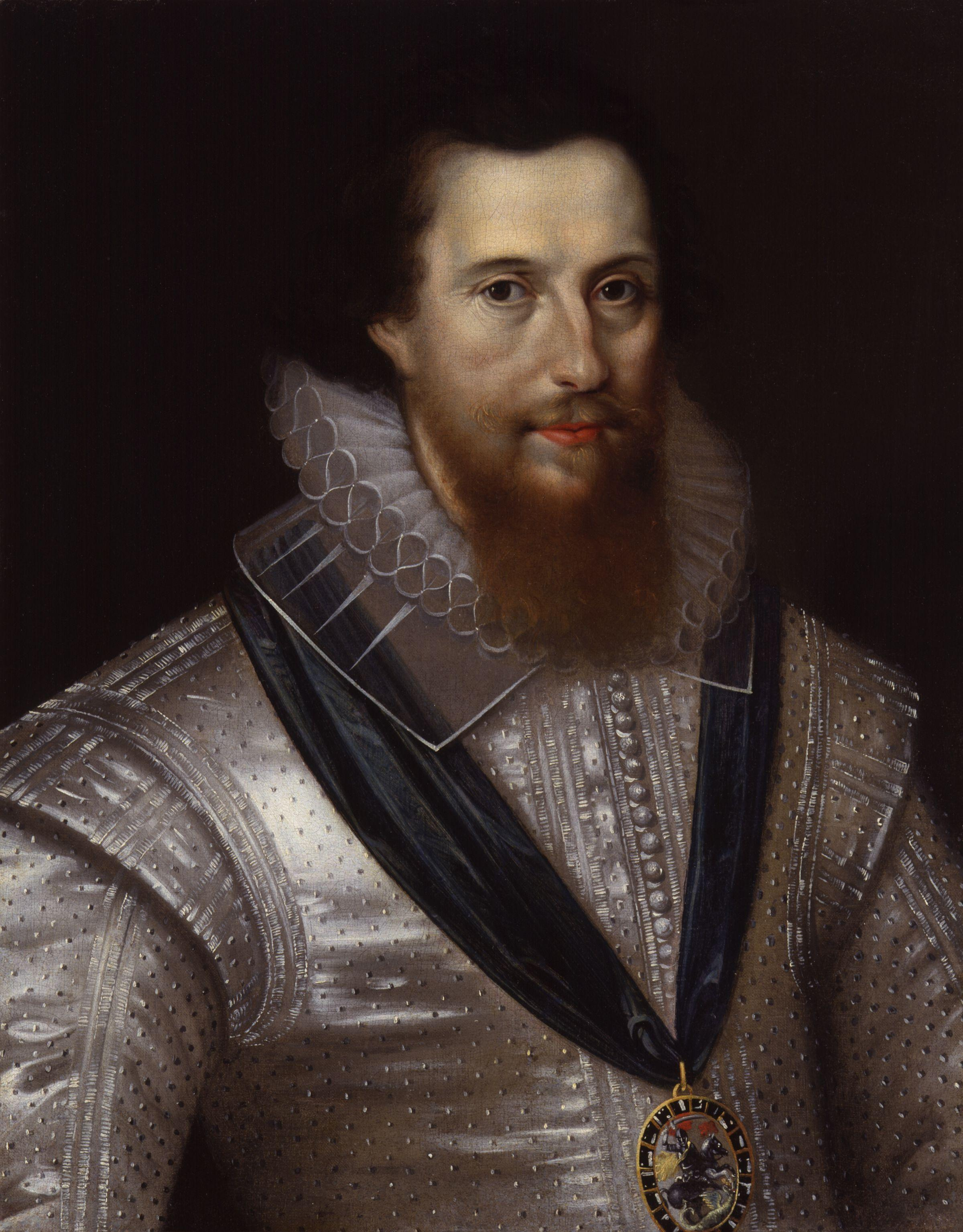
Robert Devereux, 2nd Earl of Essex by Marcus Gheeraerts the Younger. Littleton assiduously supported the cause of Essex to the point of open rebellion.

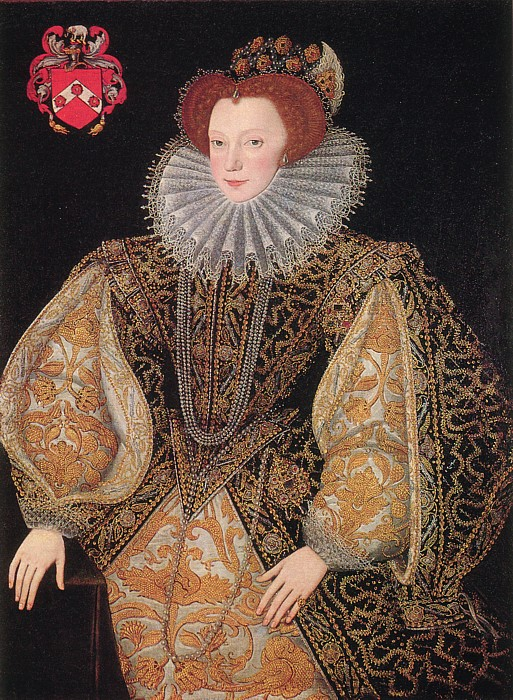
Lettice Knollys, mother of Essex, painted as Countess of Leicester. She and Sir Christopher Blount, her third husband, were an important force in the county.

From the late 1580s, Edward Littleton and most of his relatives were closely allied to Robert Devereux, 2nd Earl of Essex. Even while Essex was at university, Edward Littleton, looking to the future had presented a horse to him. Edward Littleton's wife, Margaret Devereux, was a cousin of the earl. Essex regarded Staffordshire as his own county and power base. Essex's main seat, Chartley Castle, was in Staffordshire, between the county town of Stafford and Uttoxeter, and Littleton's brother, James, managed it for him. Essex was Staffordshire's senior civic official, the Custos Rotulorum, for several years. His mother Lettice Knollys lived at Drayton Bassett with her third husband, Sir Christopher Blount. Knollys became godmother to Edward Littleton's daughter Laetitia or Lettice.

Essex is still often portrayed primarily as a suitor of the ageing Queen Elizabeth I Other historians prefer to see his career as both part of and contributory factor in a revival of factional politics in Elizabeth's court and administration after a relatively collegial period in the 1570s and 1580s. The primary causes of this were the unsettled question of the succession to Elizabeth's throne and the often-related foreign policy and military issues of the period. After the death of his step-father, Robert Dudley, 1st Earl of Leicester, in 1588, Essex emerged as the new figurehead for most of his main causes: moderately puritan but aggressively anti-Spanish.

A group of Staffordshire landowners formed a local Essex faction – mainly members of the Littleton, Bagot, Chetwynd, Trew and Aston families. However, the alliance was not confined to the Littletons of Pillaton, who were a cadet branch of the family. The Worcestershire Lytteltons (as their version of the name is generally spelt) were also closely involved with Essex, although they were motivated equally strongly by a detestation of Edward Sutton, 5th Baron Dudley, his and their main enemy in the region. In the 1590s Gilbert Lyttelton was conducting a bitter dispute with Dudley over Prestwood, a small estate near Kinver. This sometimes degenerated into raiding and street skirmishes. Essex was considered a Puritan sympathiser, and the Staffordshire Littletons decidedly Protestant, while their Worcestershire cousins leaned toward Catholicism, but local interests overcame ideological differences.

In the 1590s Edward Littleton's duties to Essex included promoting his cause in parliamentary elections. The county seats had been controlled by the Harcourt family of Ellenhall and Ranton Abbey, part of a group of Catholic sympathisers that included for a time the Astons. With the death of Simon Harcourt in 1577, their grip slackened, and into the power vacuum moved the Dudleys. Edward Sutton took a seat in 1584 while still only 17 years of age. He did not stand in 1586, after he succeeded to his father's barony. From this point, however, Essex began to take a real interest. The members elected in 1588, Walter Harcourt and Thomas Gerard, were both in 1591 recruited into the army Essex led to aid Henry IV of France and knighted by Essex at Rouen.

=== The 1593 election ===
Attempts by Essex to dictate the course of the 1593 election proved demoralising, partly because of the insistent tone of his instructions to Sir Edward Littleton, Sir Edward Aston and Richard Bagot, his agents on the ground. On 2 January 1593 Essex wrote urging them to secure the election of his step-father Christopher Blount. A week later he wrote again, this time asking them to support Gerard as second member. He added in a postscript:

"I should think my credit little in my own country, if it should not afford so small a matter as this, especially the men being so fit."

However, Sir William Harcourt had also given notice of his intention to stand for election, and he too could be counted a supporter of Essex. Then Gerard accepted a nomination in his native Lancashire, putting his weight behind Harcourt. However, Essex did not revise his instructions, leaving Bagot and Littleton, who were afraid of offending their patron, perplexed as how to proceed. As Essex had made this a test of authority, were they to pursue his express wishes, or were they to secure the best result for him? Littleton wrote to Bagot in exasperation:

"If Sir Thomas release us (as by his letter it seemeth he hath) and willeth that those procured for him should give their voices for Sir Walter Harcourt, and he would accept of it as to himself, I know not what more is to be required at our hands."

Blount and Harcourt were duly elected for Staffordshire, despite the confusion, while Gerard was returned as one of the Lancashire members.

=== The 1597 election scandal ===
The 1597 election ended in a simple, transparent fraud that deprived Littleton of the seat. This time the election turned into a direct contest between the Devereux faction and the Dudleys, probably encouraged by Essex's absence on the abortive Islands Voyage. Lord Dudley promoted his own brother, John, as candidate for a county seat. Essex had left written instructions to return Blount: it is possible, but not certain, that he left similar instructions relating to Littleton, who also stood for election. Littleton's candidature merely provoked the Dudleys, who were at the height of their dispute with his Worcestershire kinsmen: Lord Dudley had recently been fined for his riotous conduct by the Star Chamber. John Dudley, alias Sutton, was approaching 28 years old, inexperienced in public affairs, and not a property holder – hence technically disqualified. However, the Dudleys had the immense advantage of a sympathetic returning officer: the Sheriff, Thomas Whorwood of Compton Hallows (near Kinver), John Dudley's father-in-law, at whose home he resided throughout the election.

The Dudley faction began with a vigorous canvass, trying to persuade the freeholders not to divide their 2 votes but to vote solely for Sutton. It was later alleged that Whorwood, a Catholic sympathiser, improved their chances by drafting in at least five recusants from the county gaol and allowing even their wives to raise their voices in favour of Sutton, while Dudley brought in at least a hundred voters, most of them not qualified. About 800 voters came to Stafford for the election on 6 October and Whorwood rallied the Dudley supporters on one side of the market square. The vote was by voices and it immediately became apparent that Blount and Littleton were the most popular candidates, at least 200 ahead of Sutton. To confirm the result, Littleton demanded a poll. Whorwood started it but was warned off by Lord Dudley, who promised to protect him from the consequences. He then went off for dinner. The election indenture had been written out earlier by one of Whorwood's servants, leaving the names of the successful candidates blank. They were filled in later in order of precedence: Sutton and Blount.

Littleton filed a complaint to the Star Chamber against Dudley, Whorwood and Sutton. Dudley was called before the Privy Council twice in the next year, probably on this matter, although it is likely that Littleton dropped the case against the Dudleys and proceeded with Whorwood's. The feuding continued outside court, with two Worcestershire Littletons indicted by the Council in July 1598 for attacking John Sutton. The outcome of Littleton's Star Chamber action is not known. The parliament was wound up in very quickly, in February 1598, so Littleton was never able to sit as an MP, and the Dudleys were protected by parliamentary privilege until it was over.

=== The Essex rebellion ===
After disgracing himself over the Irish war, Essex found himself largely excluded from influence by the Queen's close advisers – particularly Cecil. He decided on a coup d'état, planned for 8 February 1601, intending to resolve the succession issue in favour of James VI of Scotland. Sir Edward Littleton was accused of being part of the armed group that prepared for the coup, and that was forced to act prematurely when the plot was discovered. The Essex Rebellion turned into a fiasco, with the earl's supporters marching ineffectively through London. The plotters were soon rounded up. By 12 February, with the action over, Littleton was included on a list of known conspirators, along with his kinsman John, son of Gilbert, and one of those indicted for fighting the Dudleys in Worcestershire.

Littleton's part in the events seems to have been particularly farcical, whichever version of events one accepts. An intelligence report to Cecil, headed "An information concerning some gentlemen in Staffordshire, frequenters to the Earl of Essex," portrays Littleton as a key figure in the conspiracy. It claims that, on the day of the rising, Littleton walked with Essex and Sir Christopher Blount, with his sword drawn, until they reached the River Thames. They had been turned away from St Paul's Cathedral by Richard Bancroft, the Bishop of London. Allegedly, Littleton was accompanied by his brother James, who looked after Chartley Castle for Essex. However, he was then arrested by a sergeant of the City of London – not for rebellion, but because of a bad debt. After settling the debt, Edward and James then allegedly set off to rejoin the insurgents, who had returned to Essex's House, getting as far as Temple Bar. The report sought to incriminate Edward Littleton further by accusing him of distributing arms in the countryside on the pretext of aiding the English forces in Ireland, and of plotting while at Blount's home in Drayton Bassett. His brother-in-law, John Lane of Bentley Hall is also mentioned as a companion of Littleton who regularly visits Essex's House. Other Staffordshire notables implicated in the same report are William Skeffington, a justice of the peace, and William Paget, the decidedly Protestant heir to the attainted Catholic Thomas Paget, 3rd Baron Paget. It is possible that the anonymous informant was Sir Gilbert Wakering, who was pursuing property disputes against Littleton in Staffordshire.

Littleton's own version, as told on 18 February to John Popham (judge) and Edward Coke, the Attorney General, had features in common but was incompatible. He claimed that he had visited Essex House only to hear a sermon. Finding there was none, he left and then encountered the Lord Chief Justice, with whom he conversed briefly. Shortly afterwards, he was arrested for debt, but was released by arrangement Mrs Vernon, his sister. He and James then set off for Blackfriars in search of a sermon. They were overtaken by Essex and his armed demonstration and forced to go along with it for fear of death. As soon as they heard that Thomas Gerard, a former ally of Essex, had proscribed the earl and his supporters, the Littletons got away and took refuge in a wool draper's shop near St Paul's. Sir Edward explained that he failed to report to the authorities on the following day, as instructed, because he was tired and lame. His only reason for visiting Drayton Bassett had been that he had a daughter working in the service of Lettice Knollys, whom he liked to see about once every six weeks.

After his interrogation, Littleton's case was processed quickly: it seems that Sir Walter Raleigh was asked to expedite the cases of the Littletons, with a degree of success. By 26 February Edward's name had been added to a list of those "fit to be forborne from being indicted, but yet to be fined", with the proviso that he was "to be delivered upon good bonds." In June Sir Edward again appeared on a list, this time of those to be fined, although it was not yet decided to which of her faithful servants the Queen would grant the fine, specified as £400. He wrote to Cecil, asking for easy terms:

"As I have great cause to bemoan the bitterness of my fortune so ignorantly and suddenly to be thrown into so disloyal an action, so do I acknowledge her Majesty' commiseration and your Honour's in the fine imposed upon me, accounting the same not as a compensation for my offence (having learned of your Honour that between loyalty and disloyalty there is no pecuniary proportion) but as a remembrance to posterity of her Majesty's mercy. Far be it from me to seek any further mitigation, yet humbly crave I pardon to unfold my estate which may move your Lordships to give me some convenient 'stalment. My living is divided into three parts, of which my mother has one, my brethren and sisters another, and the third, which amounteth not to two hundred pounds per annum, must suffice for the maintenance of myself and thirteen children. The more time I have by instalment, the better I shall be able to satisfy the fine. —London, this 13 June 1601."

Essex himself and Christopher Blount, his step-father and Staffordshire MP, were executed, together with other leaders. John Littleton was accused of storing arms at Prestwood, indicted, escaped execution, but died in prison in July. Edward Littlewood was lucky to escape with his life, although he lost his position on the Staffordshire bench, as well as facing a steep fine. His mother's death in 1602 must have improved his financial position, and he was restored to the bench in June of that year. This makes it likely that his explanations were considered at least plausible and that the more lurid accusations against him were discredited.

=== Member of Parliament ===
With the accession of James I in 1603, the political turbulence of Elizabeth's last years was forgotten. Among those who benefited most from James's accession were William Paget, 4th Baron Paget, Protestant scion of the formerly Catholic dynasty, and Robert Devereux, 3rd Earl of Essex, both of whom were promised restoration of their family lands and titles. Another beneficiary was Thomas Gerard, a former Essex supporter, who was soon elevated to the peerage. In the Staffordshire election of March 1604, even before these improvements in their situation were formally ratified, the powerful aristocratic families reasserted themselves.

The Devereux faction, essentially the Puritan minority among the local gentry, were able to reorganise and to pursue a coherent policy, informed by previous mistakes. In order not to split the vote, they put up only one candidate, Edward Littleton of Pillaton. They conceded the other seat to the Paget faction. Paget's nominee was Sir Robert Stanford of Perry Hall, Staffordshire. A Protestant head of a Catholic family, like Paget himself, Stanford was widely acceptable to the recusant gentry and to the much larger number of conforming Catholics. The Catholic basis of Stanford's nomination was recognised by Littleton, who later commented: "the common speech is that the assembly at Stafford on Thursday was rather to choose a pope then a knight for the Parliament because they were all of that tribe." Walter Bagot, the sheriff, was informed by his legal adviser that "if Sir Edward Littleton and Sir Robert Stanford carry off the election [it] will be well enough liked of and is least trouble."

However, the informal plan for a balanced ticket of Littleton and Stanford ran into the enmity of Sir Walter Harcourt, an Essex supporter who had sat for the county twice. Formerly a good friend, Harcourt was deeply in debt and had convinced himself that Littleton was conspiring with his creditors. He launched a campaign of disruption, including an attempt to get Littleton outlawed. Bagot kept Littleton fully informed of Harcourt's manoeuvres. He interceded unsuccessfully with Harcourt to desist and subsequently he was forced to drop his suits by increasing debts. Littleton thanked Bagot by sending him two horses – clearly a favourite Littleton touch. As a result, he was returned unopposed alongside Stanford, probably on 15 March.

Littleton was made a member of eight committees. One of these handled the restoration of the earls of Essex, Southampton and Arundel, all executed after the Essex rebellion. In April he was also appointed to a conference with the House of Lords about a proposed Union with Scotland. He served at the trinity quarter sessions in Stafford during June and then went back to Parliament, where he was appointed to a committee on poaching.

However, after a vigorous start, Littleton's involvement in parliamentary work quickly tailed off. He is not mentioned in parliamentary records after 1604. This may be due partly to involvement in his property disputes. He was fined by the Star Chamber in 1609 for disturbances during his feud with Wakering. However, faltering health was another likely factor.

The parliament lasted for seven years, outliving both Stanford and Littleton. Stanford was replaced by Sir John Egerton on his death in 1607. In 1610 the local magnates sent a certificate to Parliament averring that Littleton was dying. A by-election was ordered on 19 October. On 15 November, Francis Trentham was elected to replace Litteton as knight of the shire for Staffordshire.

== Death ==
Sir Edward Littleton died on 17 December 1610. He was interred at the church of St Michael and All Angels in Penkridge on the following day. Subsequently, a large and imposing tomb was built for himself and for his wife, Margaret Devereux, who survived until 1627.

Margaret Devereux proved his will on 14 February 1611.

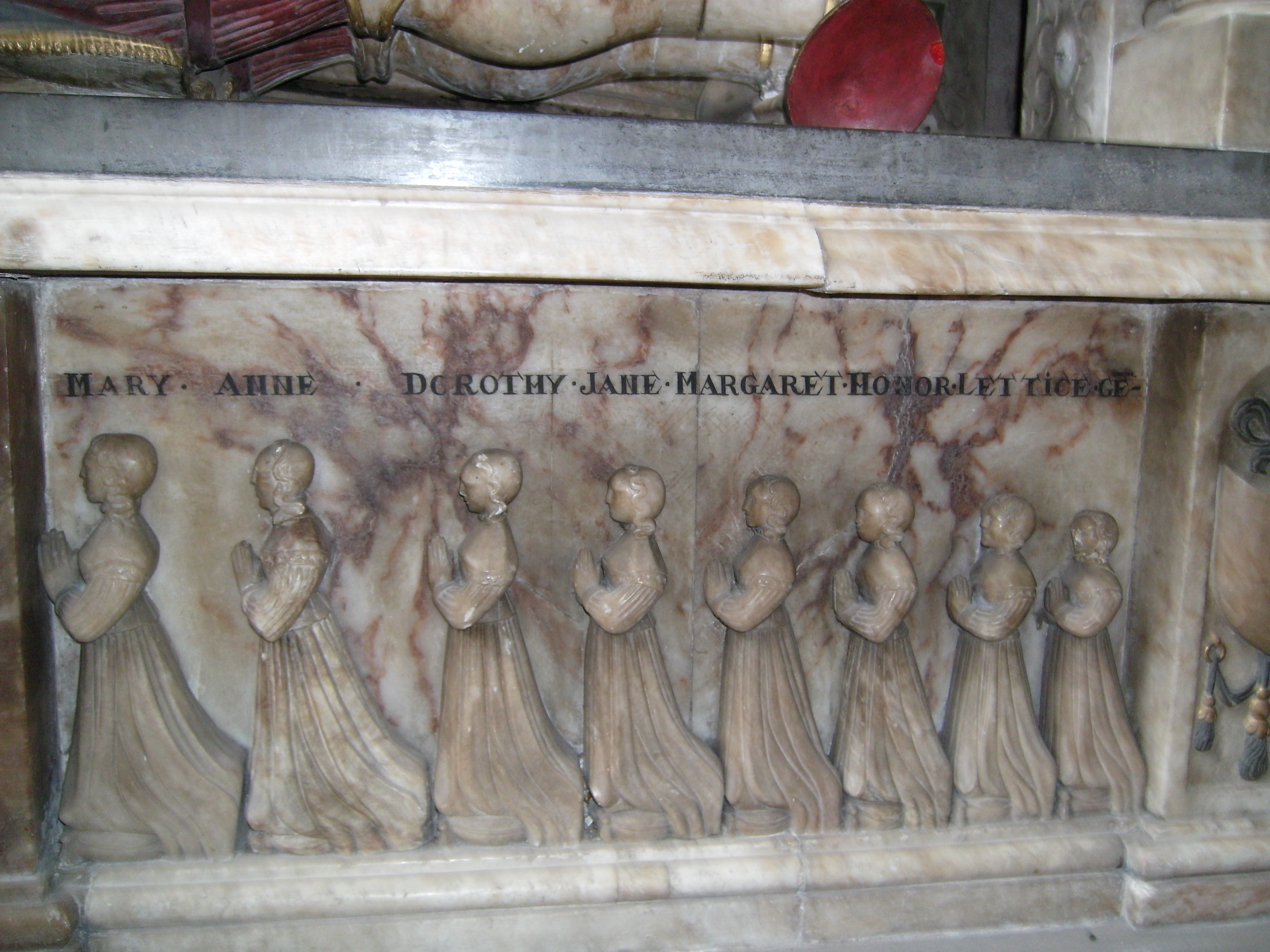
Daughters of Sir Edward Littleton and Margaret Devereux, from the double tomb in St. Michael's church, Penkridge.

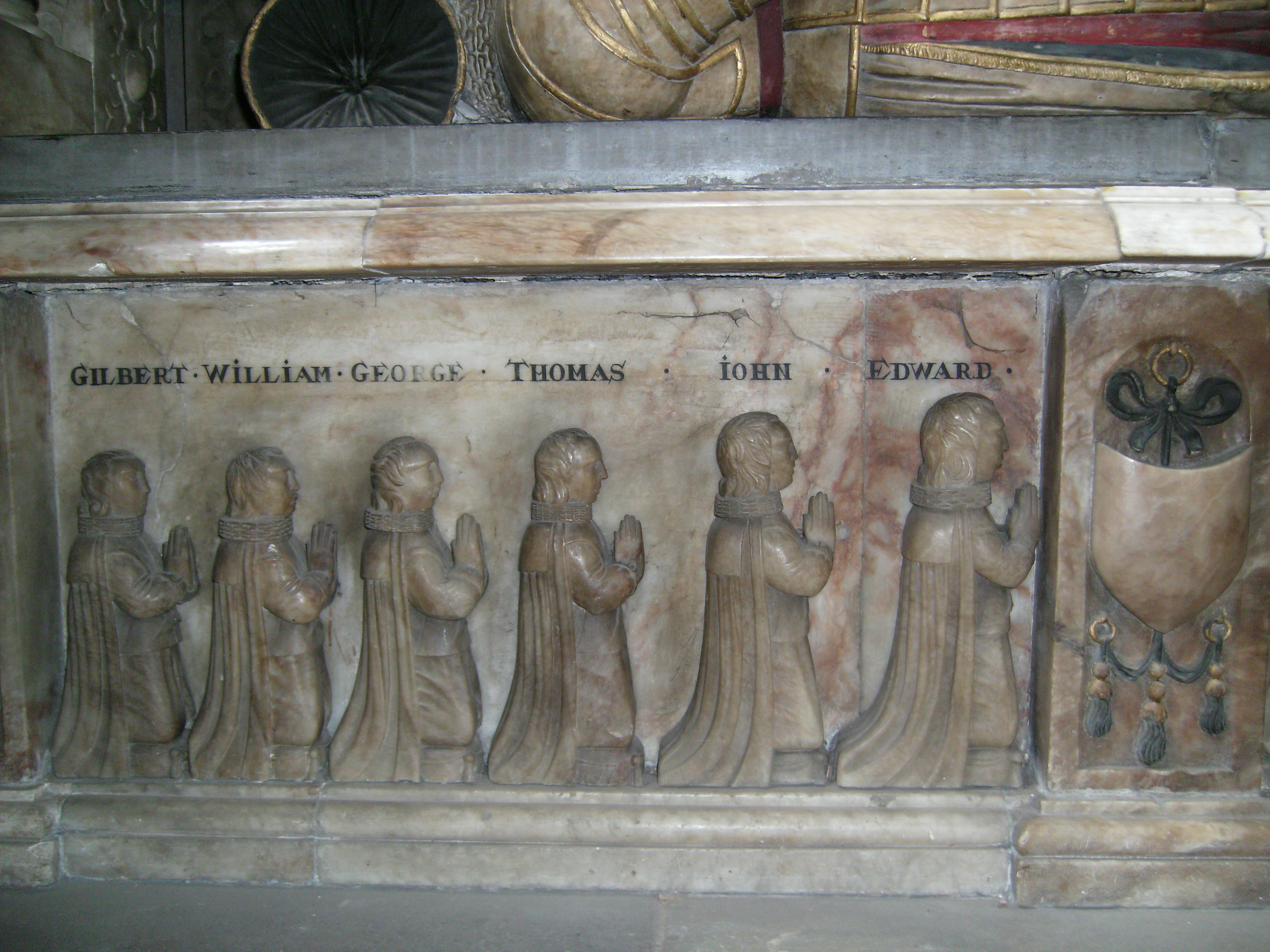
Sons of Sir Edward Littleton and Margaret Devereux, from the double tomb in St. Michael's church, Penkridge.

== Marriage and family ==
Edward Littleton married Margaret Devereux. She was the daughter of Sir William Devereux of Merevale Hall, Warwickshire, and Jane Scudamore. Sir William's father was Walter Devereux, 1st Viscount Hereford, who was the great-grandfather of the Robert Devereux, 2nd Earl of Essex. Hence Essex was Margaret Devereux's first cousin once removed. Devereux was used by the Littletons for several generations as a given name for younger sons.

Littleton and Margaret had 14 children, many of whom did not survive childhood. The fifth child, and third son, Edward Littleton, succeeded him in his estates. All of the children, six sons and eight daughters, were represented on the front of their tomb in St. Michael's church, Penkridge, which also bears the effigies of the successor Edward and his wife, Mary Fisher, on an upper tier.

== See also ==
- History of Penkridge
- Littleton Baronets
