= Frances Ward, 6th Baroness Dudley =

English baroness

Frances Ward, 6th Baroness Dudley (1611-1697) succeeded to the Barony of Dudley in 1643 following the death of Edward Sutton, 5th Baron Dudley. She had married Humble Ward, the son of a London goldsmith in 1628. Humble Ward was awarded the title of Baron Ward of Birmingham and the couple's descendants carried both titles until the middle of the eighteenth century. Frances died in 1697.

== Life ==
On 23 July 1611, Frances Sutton was born at Dudley Castle to Sir Ferdinando Sutton, the then heir to the Barony of Dudley, and Honora, daughter of Edward Seymour. Frances was baptized on 18 August 1611, also at Dudley Castle. On the death of her father in 1621, Frances became the heir apparent to the barony, then held by her grandfather Edward Sutton, the 5th Baron Dudley. During the time that he held the title, Baron Dudley had severe financial difficulties.

In 1628, Frances married Humble Ward, the son of a wealthy London goldsmith William Ward, who was also one of her grandfather's creditors. They had 3 daughters: Honor, Frances and Theodosia and 4 sons: Edward, John, Humble and William.

On 24 June 1635, Frances was given the rank of baron's daughter. She inherited the title of Baroness of Dudley on 23 June 1643 on the death of her grandfather. Her husband was granted the title of Baron Ward of Birmingham by King Charles I and their descendants held both titles until the middle of the eighteenth century. Humble Ward died on 14 October 1670. Frances died in 1697 and was buried at Himley on August 11, 1697. She was succeeded in the title of Baron of Dudley by her son, Edward Ward, '7th Baron Dudley' and '2nd Baron Ward'.

Peerage of England
Preceded by Edward Sutton, 5th Baron Dudley	Baron Dudley; 1643–1697	Succeeded by Edward Ward, 7th Baron Dudley
