= Thomas Whorwood =

Sir Thomas Whorwood (1544 – 2 November 1616) was a Staffordshire landowner, Member of the English Parliament and High Sheriff of Staffordshire. He became notorious for his involvement in election fraud.

== Background ==
The family's surname had originally been Horewood, but by this time normally spelt Whorwood, taking their name from a small manor in Horewood, later known as Compton Hallows in Kinver, but in 1387 as Haulowe, probably from its late 14th century owners or overlords. Whorwood was the first son of Edward Whorwood of Compton Hallows and of Dorothy Bassett, daughter of Thomas Bassett of Hints. He was the great nephew of the great lawyer Sir William Whorwood, half of whose property he inherited.

== Landowner ==
Whorwood ultimately had several properties in Shropshire, Staffordshire and Worcestershire, in addition to his ancestral estate. Some of these were derived from Sir William Whorwood, whose elder daughter Anne Whorwood, Countess of Warwick had died in 1552. Her husband, Ambrose Dudley, had a life interest in her estates, but when he died in 1590, they passed to Thomas Whorwood. The other daughter Margaret married the recusant Thomas Throckmorton of Coughton, Warwickshire. Throckmorton's estates were frequently sequestrated because of his religious principles. In 1578 he and Whorwood partitioned William's inheritance. By this means Thomas Whorwood acquired the manors of Stourton and Kinver, Broome, Dunsley (in Kinver) and Tyrley on the Staffordshire-Shropshire border, but several of these were subject to the dower of William's widow Margaret Sheldon until her death in 1589.

Thus Whorwood became considerably richer when his inheritance from his great uncle came into possession in 1590. At that point he moved to Stourton Castle, where he built a new family home.

== Political career ==
Whorwood was elected one of the two knights of the shire for Staffordshire in the Parliament of 1572. His colleague was John Fleetwood, a rich landowner who had made a fortune from the dissolution of the monasteries. The parliament technically lasted for almost twelve years, as the next was summoned in 1584. However, it actually met for only three widely spaced sessions. Whorwood's only known contribution came on 25 January 1572, when he spoke in favour of keeping the assizes at Stafford.

Now that he was better-known, and especially as he began to come into the property, Whorwood was appointed to public offices. About 1573 he was made a justice of the peace for Staffordshire. In 1574 he was pricked to become High Sheriff of Staffordshire, a post of honour, but also onerous and often expensive. However, Whorwood was known to be of very conservative religious views and was probably suspected of being a Catholic sympathiser. Certainly he had close Catholic connections within his family. His election in 1572, sharing the county with Fleetwood, known to be decidedly Protestant, may have been because of the backing of a conservative clique among the Staffordshire landed gentry. This faction, centred on the Harcourts of Ellenhall and Ranton Abbey and their kinsmen, the Astons and the Greys of Enville, Staffordshire had great influence in the county and, although slowly losing their grip, were still a force to be reckoned with. William Whorwood had married into the Grey family. The conservative group was described by Thomas Bentham, the radical Protestant Bishop of Coventry and Lichfield, as "a knot hurtful to justice and great maintainers", i.e. magnates who had a large following whom they maintained through employment or tenancies. It was probably because of these associations that Whorwood lost his place on the commission of the peace in 1580 and for some years his public career was in eclipse.

In about 1590, Whorwood's daughter Elizabeth married John Sutton or Dudley, brother of Edward Sutton, 5th Baron Dudley. Apparently this was a runaway marriage. Sutton was the son and brother of peers, but the family was generally in debt. He was supposed to receive an annuity of £300 under the terms of his father's will, but his brother was unable to pay it. As a result, he was forced to live with the Whorwoods at Compton Hallows. A connection with the nobility, however impoverished, was still a social advantage to the Whorwoods. At about the same time as the marriage, the death of William Whorwood's son-in-law, Ambrose Dudley, brought Thomas into his greatest inheritance. In all his years in the shade, he was never actually accused of any disloyalty to the Crown or the Church of England. During the 1590s, his prestige began to rise again. From 1596 he was back on the commission of the peace for Staffordshire, and in the same year he was pricked Sheriff again.

However, Whorwood was now drawn into the Dudley family's violent and unscrupulous dealings, to his own detriment. The Dudleys had long been at odds with the Lytteltons, the Worcestershire branch of a family descended from the great jurist Thomas de Littleton. Lord Dudley and Gilbert Lyttelton became embroiled in a bitter dispute over ownership of Prestwood, a Staffordshire farm near Whorwood's Stourton Castle, near Kinver. The dispute escalated to violence on both sides. After a cattle raid by Dudley, Lyttelton had him brought before the Star Chamber, which fined him heavily. To smear Dudley, Lyttelton pointed out that he did not maintain his wife and children, choosing instead to live with his mistress, Elizabeth Tomlinson, a coal miner's daughter. The Privy Council then intervened and in August 1597 confined Dudley in the Fleet Prison until he promised to contribute to their upkeep. On his release, he not only fell rapidly into arrears, but immediately embarked on a course of further confrontation with the Lytteltons. Part of Dudley's revenge was to intervene in the 1597 parliamentary elections. By supporting the candidature of his brother John in Staffordshire, Dudley could hope to repair some of the fractures in his own family, opening up a fresh route to profit for his impecunious brother, while damaging the interests of his enemies, as Sir Edward Littleton of Pillaton Hall, a kinsman of Gilbert, had already entered the contest. Dudley was counting on the help of Whorwood, as Sheriff and therefore, a returning officer in the election.

The Dudley campaign was directed specifically against Littleton, who was an ally and client of Robert Devereux, 2nd Earl of Essex, a major force not only in the county but at Court. On the day of the election, 6 October 1597, Whorwood, supposedly neutral, rallied the Dudley supporters on one side of the market square in Stafford. It was later alleged that Whorwood used his authority as Sheriff to release Catholic recusants from the county gaol and allowed them and their wives to vote. He certainly permitted Edward Lord Dudley, a peer to add his voice to his brother's vote. When the voice vote went against Dudley, with Littleton and Sir Christopher Blount, another Essex ally, well ahead of John Sutton, Whorwood marched the Dudley supporters around the town centre, shouting, "A Dudley!" To make sure of his victory, Littleton demanded that Whorwood conduct a poll. This he began, but stopped when Dudley assured him he would protect him from the consequences. He then went off to dine. He had already furnished an electoral indenture, complete with seals and the names of witnesses, but with the names of the successful candidates left blank. These were then filled in as Sutton and Blount, in order of precedence. Thus Littleton was simply excluded by blatant fraud.

Littleton immediately appealed to the Star Chamber, proceeding against both the Suttons and Whorwood. It seems that he later allowed the complaints against the brothers to lapse, while pursuing Whorwood, who had behaved "in very indecent and outrageous manner". Lettice Knollys, the Countess of Leicester, who was Blount's wife and the mother of Essex, wrote to Essex, complaining of the indignity of her husband being ranked lower in precedence than Sutton, and wishing that the Sheriff should be made to pay for his behaviour. The letter seems to have won Lord Dudley another Privy Council appearance. The outcome of the Star Chamber proceedings is not known: it is unlikely Whorwood escaped punishment. He never again occupied major office. Nevertheless, he was knighted in 1603.

Sir Thomas Whorwood died on 2 November 1616. He was succeeded in his estates by his son, Gerard.

== Marriage and family ==
Thomas Whorwood married Magdalene Edwards, daughter of Rowland Edwards of London, no later than 1563. They had at least one daughter and one son:

- Elizabeth Whorwood, who married John Dudley or Sutton, Baron Dudley's brother.

- Gerard Whorwood (1565–1627), the heir to the estates.
