= John Dudley (1569–1645) =

English politician (1569–1645)

Hon. John Sutton (November 1569 – 1645), was the brother of Edward Sutton, 5th Baron Dudley and was briefly Member of the Parliament of England for Staffordshire. during the reign of Elizabeth I.

== Background and early life ==
John Sutton was the son of Edward Sutton, 4th Baron Dudley. His mother was Jane Stanley, who was a daughter of Edward Stanley, 3rd Earl of Derby and the 4th Baron's second wife. John Sutton was their second son, born about two years after his brother Edward, who became the 5th Baron. He was baptised on 30 November 1569, so born shortly before that date. At the very early age of 11, he was sent to Lincoln College, Oxford.

The 4th Baron was able to recover the family estates after they were obtained, as a result of debt, by John Dudley, Duke of Northumberland a distant relative, and forfeited to the Crown on Northumberland's execution in 1553. However, he was unable to make progress with the huge outstanding debts. In order to ensure creditors were paid by his heir, his will earmarked the proceeds of his coalmines for 21 years to his creditors, who were also given prior claim over his wife and over John. When the 4th Baron died in 1586, John received only his father's best clothes and £300, with an annuity to be paid by his brother, but no house or land. As late as 1592 John had never received his annuity.

In about 1590 John married Elizabeth Whorwood, daughter of a Thomas Whorwood, a wealthy Staffordshire landowner and politician, apparently against the wishes of Edward, the head of the family. He settled at the Whorwood family seat, Compton Hallows, near Kinver, with his new wife. Thomas Whorwood received a large inheritance at that point and began to build a new family home at Stourton Castle. John is therefore referred to as "Hon. John Dudley of Compton Hallows", as it seems he and Elizabeth retained the old family home. Having no freehold property of his own, he was not entitled either to stand or to vote in parliamentary elections for the county.

== Parliamentary career ==
John Sutton's election to parliament came about as a result of the notorious Staffordshire election scandal of 1597. Baron Dudley prevailed on Whorwood, John's father-in-law, and at that time High Sheriff of Staffordshire, to conspire in the return of a false electoral indenture. He was placed, as John Sutton, first in order of precedence over Sir Christopher Blount, step-father of Robert Devereux, 2nd Earl of Essex. Edward Littleton, another Essex client, who had clearly won a seat in the voice vote, was excluded altogether.

John Sutton thus became knight of the shire or MP, although Littleton launched actions against him, his brother and Whorwood in the Star Chamber, the most feared instrument of Tudor government. John was protected by parliamentary privilege during the parliament and it assembled on 24 October 1597. However, he played no recorded part in its proceedings, making no speech and attending none of the committees consistent with being a Staffordshire county member. The parliament was dissolved, after little more than three months, on 9 February 1598, leaving John exposed to investigation and punishment. By May Essex had him answering questions before the Privy Council.

Lord Dudley's main motivation in standing his brother for election had been to spite Littleton's relatives in Worcestershire, particularly Gilbert Lyttelton, with whom he had several property disputes. Two of Lyttelton's sons, Stephen and John, attacked John Sutton in revenge for the electoral fraud, probably in June or July, and were referred by the Privy Council to the Worcestershire assizes. It is not known whether John Sutton himself was punished for his part in events, but he played no further part in public life, retiring to Compton.

== Marriage and family ==
John Sutton married Elizabeth Whorwood, daughter of Thomas Whorwood by 1590. They had one son, who predeceased them both, and four daughters, including;

- Anne Sutton, married Edward Gibson, a son of Sir John Gibson of Welburn.
- Elizabeth Sutton, said to have died before 1660. She may have been Elizabeth Dudley, Countess of Löwenstein, a lady in waiting to Elizabeth Stuart, Queen of Bohemia.
- Edward Sutton.
- Jane Sutton.
- Anne Sutton, who married Sir Francis Pophham, according to the History of Parliament (1981). However, Francis Popham's wife is also described as a daughter of John Sutton of Yanwath and an heiress of Thomas Sutton, founder of the Charterhouse.

In 1660 Anne Gibson's son Edward Gibson, a soldier who had served in Holland, claimed to be the heir of Baron Dudley. His petition stated that he was John Sutton's heir, as Edward, Elizabeth and Jane had no children.
