= Humble Ward, 1st Baron Ward =

Humble Ward
- 1st Baron Ward

1st Baron Ward
- Predecessor: Title created
- Successor: Edward Ward
- Full name: Humble Ward, 1st Baron Ward
- Born: c. 1614
- Died: 14 October 1670 (aged c. 55–56)
- Noble family: Ward
- Spouse: Frances Sutton
- Issue: Edward Ward, 2nd Baron Ward; Hon. William Ward
- Father: William Ward
- Occupation: High Sheriff of Staffordshire

Humble Ward, 1st Baron Ward, of Birmingham (c. 1614 – 14 October 1670) was the son and heir of William Ward, a London goldsmith.

He married Frances Sutton otherwise Dudley, 6th Baroness Dudley, granddaughter and sole heir of Edward Sutton, 5th Baron Dudley, whose estates including Dudley Castle and Himley Hall were settled on them on 17 February 1628, at their marriage. William Ward used his wealth to buy out Lord Dudley's debts, thereby rescuing what was left of the Dudley estate from Dudley's creditors.

Following her grandfather's death in 1643, Frances succeeded as Baroness Dudley (in her own right). Her husband was created Lord Ward in 1644. As of 1647, he was the owner of properties in London including 45 Borough High Street.

He was High Sheriff of Staffordshire in 1658.

Frances survived her husband, dying on 11 August 1697.

Their eldest son Edward Ward, 7th Baron Dudley succeeded as 2nd Baron Ward in 1670 and as 7th Baron Dudley in 1697. His male line died out, so that the present Baron Dudley is descended through the female line, whereas the Earls of Dudley are descended from Hon. William Ward, their second son.

Peerage of England
New creation	Baron Ward; 1644–1670	Succeeded by Edward Ward
