= Edward Sutton, 5th Baron Dudley =

English peer, politician and landowner

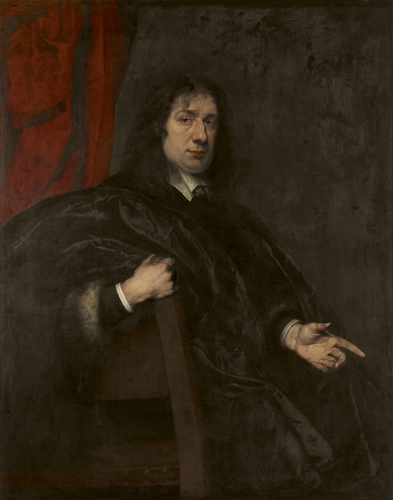
Portrait of Sutton

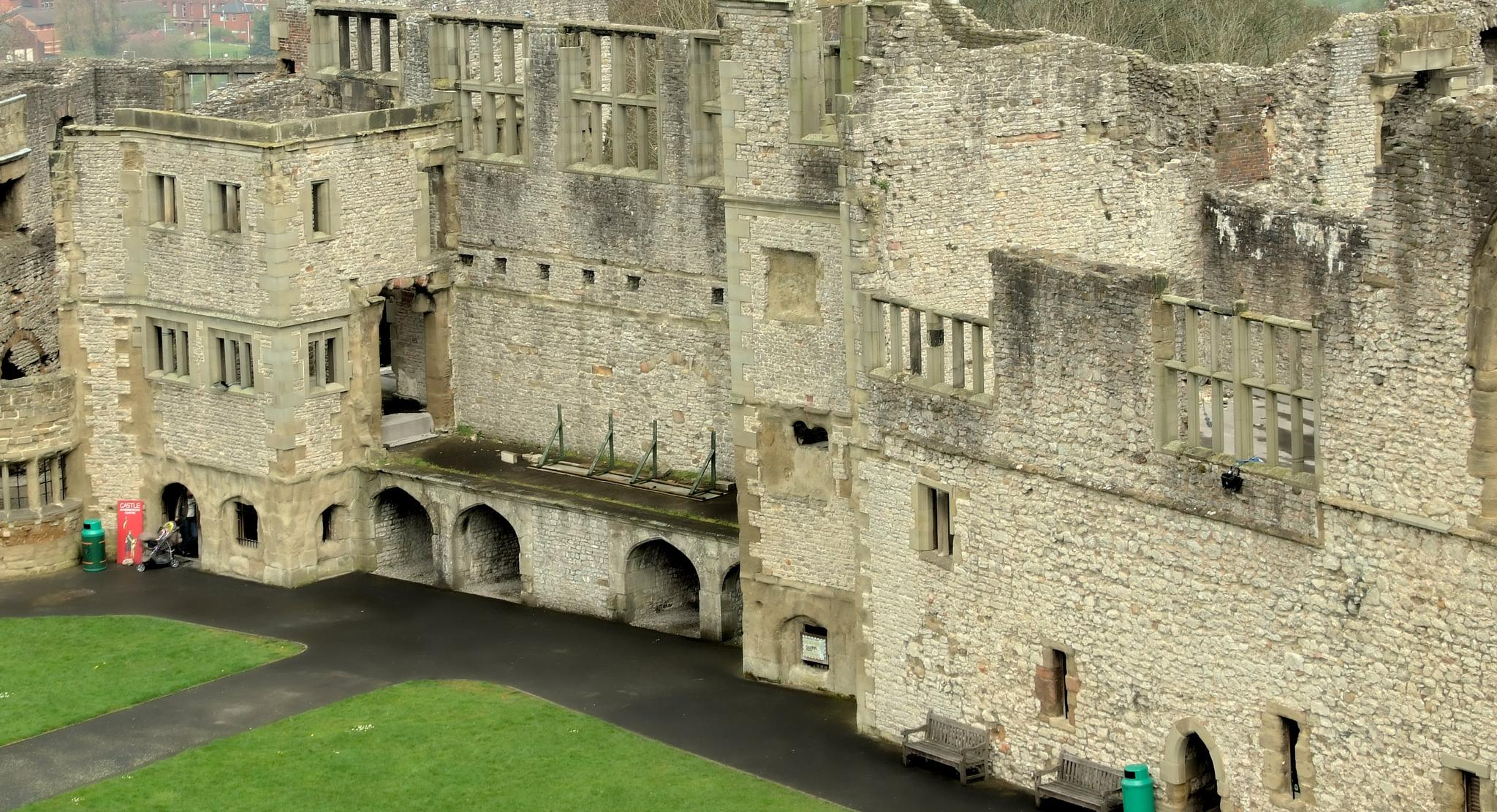
Dudley Castle, now ruined, was Lord Dudley's seat and main home.

Edward Sutton, 5th Baron Dudley (9 September 1567 – 23 June 1643) was an English peer, politician, and landowner. He briefly served in the House of Commons. Sutton became widely known for his intemperate behaviour, which ultimately led to the financial ruin of his family. He was the last of his lineage to hold the title of Baron Dudley.

== Background and early life ==
Sutton's father was Edward Sutton, 4th Baron Dudley, a distinguished soldier who managed to regain the family estates after they were forfeited to John Dudley, Duke of Northumberland, due to debt. His mother was Jane Stanley, the second wife of the 4th Baron and the daughter of Edward Stanley, 3rd Earl of Derby. He had a younger brother, John, and an elder half-sister, Agnes, from his father's first marriage.

Edward Sutton is believed to have been born in September 1567 as he was baptised on 17 September 1567. At the age of 13, in 1580, he was sent to Lincoln College, Oxford, to further his education. The following year, when he was just 14 years old, he married Theodosia Harington of Exton, Rutland who was about 5 years older.

== Lord Dudley's players ==
Sutton was the patron of a group of actors, known as Lord Dudley's players, and a performing bear. In 1595 he drew up a warrant for his company led by Francis Coffyn and Laurence Bradshaw to travel and perform. Sutton revoked this license and patronised a different group of actors, but some actors tried unsuccessfully to use the cancelled 1595 warrant in Chester in November 1602.

Lord Dudley's players were in Newcastle in March 1600. In 1615 the leader of the company was called Dishley.

== Political career ==
Edward Sutton was elected as one of the two knights of the shire for Staffordshire in 1584. Still only 17 years old, he was returned ahead in order of precedence of Edward Legh. It is not clear how this was achieved. Legh was made High Sheriff of Staffordshire on the day of the election and had to be given leave of absence by Parliament. Sutton made no recorded contributions in the Commons. He succeeded his father in 1586 and so was unable to stand for election that year. Despite his apparent anxiety to serve in the councils of his country, Sutton did not take his seat in the House of Lords until 1593.

Sutton's most important political intervention came through the Staffordshire election scandal of 1597. Pursuing a property dispute with the Worcestershire Lytteltons, Sutton put up his brother John as a candidate, in an attempt to stop the election of Sir Edward Littleton of Pillaton Hall, a close ally of Robert Devereux, 2nd Earl of Essex. Sutton ensured success by procuring a blank election return from Thomas Whorwood, the High Sheriff, who was John Sutton's father-in-law. Littleton, cheated of certain victory, filed bills against the Suttons and Whorwood in Star Chamber.

Among his complaints against Lord Dudley was that he had personally voted for his brother in the voice vote at Stafford. As a peer, Sutton should have no part in elections to the Commons, Littleton maintained, apparently the first time this constitutional principle was expressed. The other candidate, Sir Christopher Blount, Essex's stepfather, was also offended at having been placed below Sutton on the election indenture. His wife, Essex's mother, wrote to the Earl complaining about the outrage, and Sutton was summoned before the Privy Council.

However, the parliament was soon over, and it appears that Littleton chose to concentrate his efforts on the hapless Whorwood. Although his chicanery and bad manners had alienated some of the greatest in the land, the consequences for Sutton might have been worse.

== Landowner and industrialist ==
Edward Sutton spent most of his life pressured by the authorities to meet debts that were beyond his ability to pay, partly inherited from his father, and partly the result of his own poor management of his resources.

Lord Dudley, like his immediate ancestors, owned substantial estates around Dudley Castle including the manors of Dudley, Sedgley and Kingswinford. He developed the mineral resources of these estates, building (probably) five blast furnaces on them. He obtained a licence to use the patent of John Robinson (or Rovenson) for making iron with pitcoal (that is, mineral coal) in 1619, and in 1622 renewed this patent in his own name. Sutton was said to be an innovator who set up an early reverberatory furnace using coal and a glassworks directed by Paul Tissac, or Tyzack, where coal rather than wood was first used as fuel. These projects brought him no profit.

Edward Sutton brought his illegitimate son Dud Dudley home from Balliol College, Oxford to manage his ironworks, but this strategy was not entirely successful. Ultimately Edward Sutton fell out with Dud and expelled Dud from the new coke-fired blast furnace that Edward had built at Hasco Bridge on the boundary between Gornal and Himley. Debts continued to grow, and by 1593 the estate had been sequestrated.

The ironworks were essential because the family's debts were already so large that Lord Edward's father's will had earmarked all the proceeds of his ironworks for 21 years to pay creditors, who were given precedence over his widow and younger children. Money issues soured relations with John, Edward Sutton's younger brother.

John had been compensated for his exclusion from a portion of his father's estate by the promise of an annuity from his brother, which Edward never paid. The electoral fraud of 1597 might have helped John establish new contacts and income streams, but the parliament lasted little more than three months and the scandal made any further parliamentary career impossible for him.

Always short of money, Edward Sutton fought numerous battles to maintain his inheritance and income, many of them through violence. His most bitter feud was with Gilbert Lyttelton, centred on the farm of Prestwood, near Kinver, and reached its height in the 1590s. Prestwood is at the confluence of the River Smestow and the Worcestershire Stour.

Sutton had Lyttelton ejected by force. He then claimed the right to seize outlaws' goods on other Lyttelton estates and raided them, driving off the sheep and cattle. Extending the dispute still further, he claimed one of Lyttelton's coal mines. He had the miners arrested, confiscated the stocks of coal and set the mine on fire. The Privy Council summoned Lord Dudley and tried to reason with him, to no effect. Lyttelton complained to the Star Chamber, which found in his favour, fining Sutton heavily for rioting and cattle rustling. It was this that led Sutton to attempt revenge by blocking Edward Littleton's election, as he was a distant kinsman of Gilbert Lyttelton.

Feelings were very bitter on both sides. The Privy Council had to write to the Worcestershire assizes in July 1598, demanding action against two of Gilbert Lyttelton's sons, Stephen and John, who had attacked John Sutton and his retainers, although the Suttons had already lost the property dispute.

== Marriage and family ==
Dudley was married at the age of 14 to Theodosia Harington (d. 1649). She was the daughter of James Harington of Exton, Rutland, a lawyer and long-serving MP. The Haringtons were the most important landowners in Rutland and Theodosia's eldest brother, John, was created Baron Harington of Exton in 1603. Dudley and Theodosia had a son and four daughters:

- Sir Ferdinando Sutton (1588-1621), who married Honora Seymour, a daughter of Edward Seymour, Viscount Beauchamp, who was considered by some a potential claimant to the throne on the death of Elizabeth I.

- Mary Sutton (1586–1645), who married Alexander Home, 1st Earl of Home.

- Anne Sutton (1589-1615), who married Hans Meinhard von Schönberg, the Palatine Ambassador to England: their son was Frederick Schomberg, 1st Duke of Schomberg.

- Margaret Sutton (1597-1674), who in 1627 married Sir Miles Hobart, Knight of the Bath, of Fleet Street in the City of London and of Little Plumstead in Norfolk, a son of Henry Hobart of Plumstead by his wife Willoughby Hopton, a daughter of Arthur Hopton of Blythburgh and Witham. They had sons Edward, Miles, Tom, John and James, and a daughter Willoughby. She was buried at St Margaret's, Westminster.

- Theodosia Sutton (1599-1615).

Lord Dudley also had a longtime mistress Elizabeth Tomlinson, who bore him a large family of illegitimate children, at least 11 in number. Lord Dudley provided for this second family. The eldest Robert Dudley otherwise Tomlinson was given a small estate at Netherton in Dudley. Another son Dud Dudley was given a lease of Chasepool Lodge in Swindon, Staffordshire. A daughter Jane was grandmother to ironmaster Abraham Darby I. A John Dudley who features in the diary of Lady Anne Clifford may have been a son of Elizabeth Tomlinson.

At the Star Chamber, Gilbert Lyttelton attempted to discredit Dudley by claiming that he had abandoned his wife in London without support to live with Elizabeth Tomlinson, "a lewd and infamous woman, a base collier's daughter". The Privy Council ordered Dudley to pay his wife an allowance, which he failed to do. In August 1597 he was sent to Fleet Prison. He was released after a few days, on condition that he pay maintenance of £100 annually for his wife, and £20 for each legitimate child. In less than 18 months he was back before the Privy Council, having got into arrears.

Dudley's legitimate son, Ferdinando, predeceased him, leaving a daughter Frances. Dudley married this granddaughter to Humble Ward, the son of a wealthy goldsmith, William Ward, who was one of his creditors.

Dudley died on 23 June 1643 and was buried in St Edmund's Church, Dudley. Frances Ward inherited the estates, with their debts, and became Baroness Dudley suo jure. Humble Ward paid the debts and redeemed the estates for the benefit of themselves and their descendants.

== Further reading and external links ==
- 'A letter from Edward Sutton at Himley to Walter Bagot, 14 January 1603/4', Folger Shakespeare Library, Early Modern Manuscripts Online, L.a.433.
- P. W. King, 'Dud Dudley's contribution to metallurgy' Hist. Metall. 22(1) (2002), 43–53.

Peerage of England
Preceded by Edward Sutton	Baron Dudley; 1586–1643	Succeeded by Frances Ward
