= John Sutton =

John Sutton may refer to:

== Noblemen ==
- John Sutton II (1310–1359), first Baron Sutton of Dudley
- John Sutton III (1339–1370), 2nd Baron Sutton of Dudley
- John Sutton IV (1361–1396), 3rd Baron Sutton of Dudley
- John Sutton V (1380–1406), father of 1st Baron Dudley
- John Sutton of Lincoln (died c. 1391), MP for Lincoln
- John Sutton, 1st Baron Dudley (1400–1487), Lord Lieutenant of Ireland
- John Sutton, 3rd Baron Dudley (1494–1553), mockingly known as Lord Quondam
- John de Sutton (fl. 1306), MP for Essex
- John Sutton (MP for City of London), for City of London

== Sportsmen ==
- John Sutton (baseball) (born 1952), former Major League Baseball pitcher
- John Sutton (footballer) (born 1983), English footballer
- John Sutton (rugby league) (born 1984), Australian professional rugby league footballer
- John Sutton (hurler) (1928–1989), Irish sportsperson

== Others ==
- John Sutton (composer), English Renaissance composer
- John Sutton (Royal Navy officer) (c. 1758–1825)
- John Sutton (seed merchant) (1777–1863), founder of Suttons Seeds
- John Sutton Nettlefold (1792–1866), British industrialist
- Sir John Sutton, 3rd Baronet (1820–1873), benefactor and patron in Kiedrich
- John Edward Sutton (1862–1945), British trade unionist and Labour Party politician
- John Sutton (actor) (1908–1963), British-Indian actor
- John Sutton (geologist) (1919–1992), British geologist after which the Sutton Heights are named
- John Sutton (RAF officer) (1932–2014)
- John Sutton (economist) (born 1948), economist at the London School of Economics
- John R. Sutton (born 1949), sociologist at University of California, Santa Barbara
- John F. Sutton Jr. (1919–2013), American lawyer and academic
- Oliver Humperdink (John Sutton; 1949–2011), professional wrestling manager
- Johnny Sutton (born 1961), U.S. politician

== See also ==
- John Manners-Sutton (disambiguation)
