= Parkhead (disambiguation) =

Parkhead is a suburb of the Scottish city of Glasgow.

Elsewhere in the United Kingdom places named Park Head or Parkhead are:

- Parkhead, Aberdeenshire, Scotland
- Parkhead, Cumbria, England
- Parkhead, Edinburgh, Scotland
- Parkhead, Sheffield, England
- Park Head, Cornwall, England
- Park Head, Derbyshire, England
- Park Head, Kirklees, England
- Park Head, Cornwall
- Park Head, Cumbria
- Park Head, Derbyshire
- Park Head, Kirklees

== See also ==
- Celtic Park, often referred to as "Parkhead"
- Parkhead Viaduct in Dudley, West Midlands
