= Dudley Castle =

Grade I listed castle in Dudley, England

- Part of Dudley Zoological Gardens
- Dudley, West Midlands
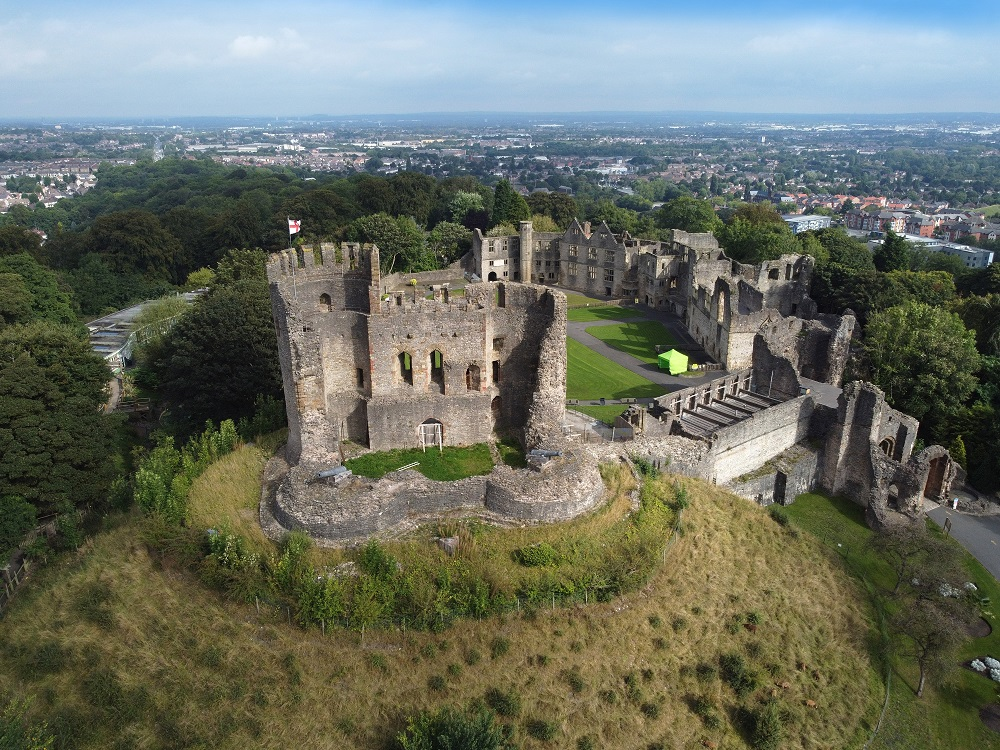
- The keep of Dudley Castle

Site information
- Type: Motte and Bailey
- Owner: Dudley Metropolitan Borough Council
- Controlled by: Dudley and West Midlands Zoological Society
- Open to the public: Yes
- Condition: Ruined

Location
- Shown within the West Midlands
- Location within West Midlands county
- Coordinates: 52.5142°N 2.0800°W

Site history
- Built: 1070
- Built by: Ansculf de Picquigny
- In use: Until 1750
- Materials: Limestone
- Battles/wars: The Anarchy; English Civil War

Dudley Castle is a ruined fortification in the town of Dudley, West Midlands, England. Originally, a wooden motte and bailey castle built soon after the Norman Conquest, it was rebuilt as a stone fortification during the twelfth century but subsequently demolished on the orders of Henry II of England. The rebuilding of the castle took place in the second half of the thirteenth century. It culminated in the construction of a range of buildings within the fortifications by John Dudley. The fortifications were slighted by order of the Parliament of England during the English Civil War and the residential buildings were destroyed by fire in 1750. In the nineteenth and early twentieth centuries, the site was used for fêtes and pageants. Today, Dudley Zoo is located on its grounds.

Its location, Castle Hill, is an outcrop of Wenlock Group limestone that was extensively quarried during the Industrial Revolution and which now, along with Wren's Nest Hill, is a scheduled monument of the best-surviving remains of the limestone industry in Dudley. It is also a Grade I listed building. Localised structural problems led to it being placed on Historic England's Heritage at Risk register in 2020.

The Dudley Tunnel runs beneath Castle Hill, but not the castle itself.

== History ==
=== Medieval ===
The antiquarian William Camden claimed a castle was constructed at Dudley about the year 700 by a Mercian duke named Dodo or Doddo and some subsequent histories and articles repeated this claim. However, this assertion is not taken seriously by today's historians, who usually date the castle from soon after the Norman Conquest of 1066. It is thought one of the Conqueror's followers, Ansculf de Picquigny, built the first castle in 1070. The Domesday Book of 1086 records that Ansculf's son, William Fitz-Ansculf, was in possession of the castle when it was recorded at the time of the survey of 1086. The first line of the Domesday entry for Dudley translates as: "the said William held Dudley; and there is his castle". Some of the earthworks from this castle, notably the "motte", the vast mound on which the present castle keep now sits, still remain. However, the earliest castle would have been of wooden construction and no longer exists.

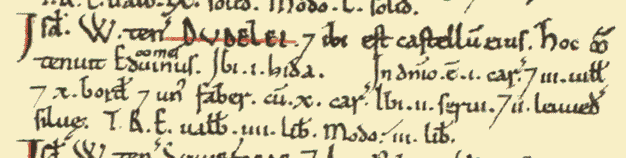
Dudley Castle was first mentioned in the Domesday Book of 1086

After Fitz-Ansculf, the castle came into the possession of the Paganel family, who built the first stone castle on the site. This castle was strong enough to withstand a siege in 1138 by the forces of King Stephen. However, after Gervase Paganel joined a failed rebellion against King Henry II in 1173, the castle was demolished (slighted) by order of the king. According to historian Sidney Painter, it was one of at least 21 castles demolished on Henry II's instructions. The Somery's were the next dynasty to own the site when Ralph de Somery I succeeded his uncle, Gervase Paganel in 1194. Roger de Somery II set about rebuilding the castle in 1262. The castle was far from completion on the death of Roger de Somery II in 1272 and the construction carried on from this time into the 14th century by Roger's heirs. The keep (the most obvious part of the castle when viewed from the town) and the main gate date from this re-building.

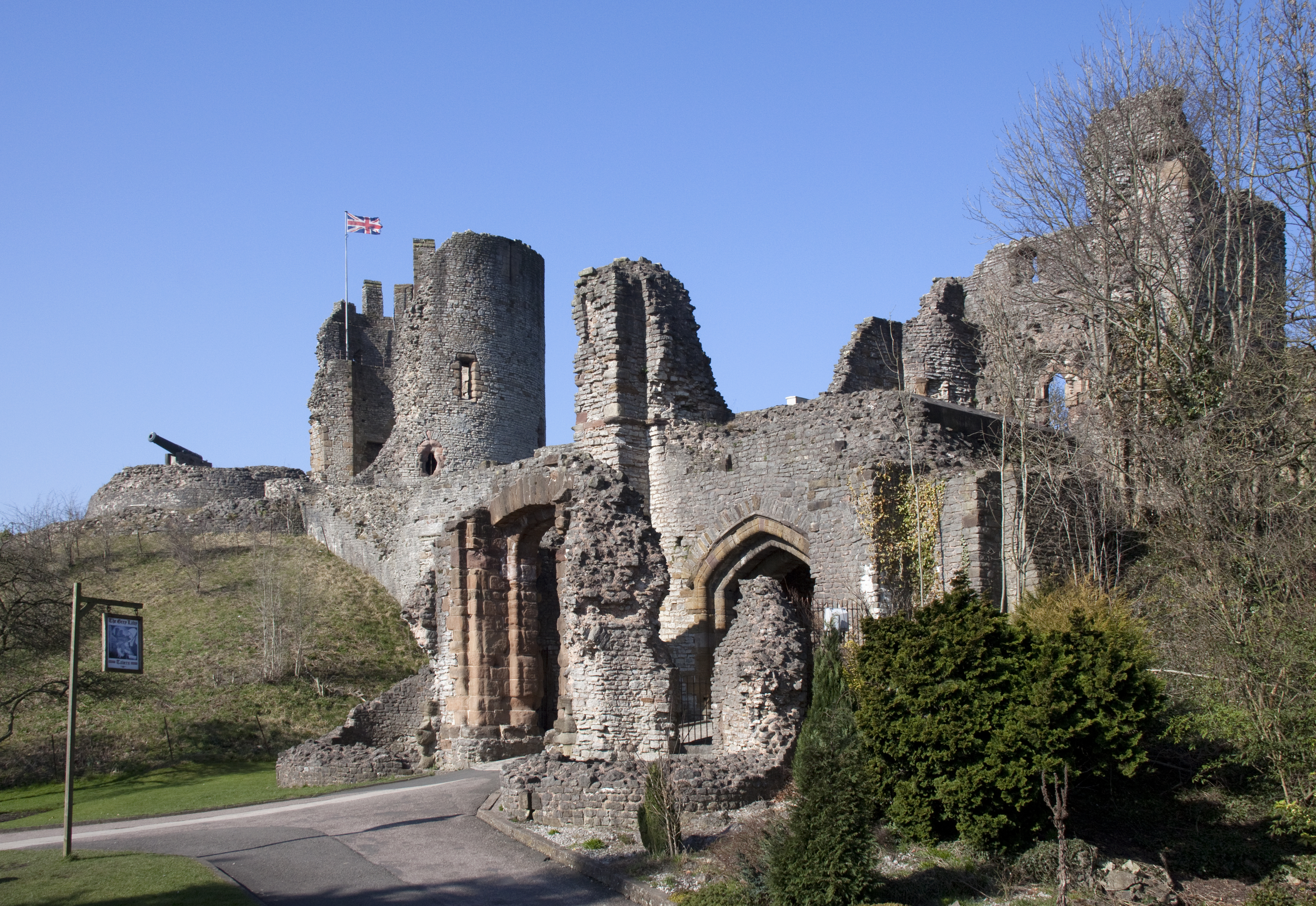
The castle was partly demolished in 1646 on the orders of Parliament.

The last of the male line of Somery, John Somery, died in 1321. It is thought that the fortifications were complete by this date. The castle and estates passed to John Somery's sister Margaret and her husband, John de Sutton. Subsequently, members of this family often used Dudley as a surname. John and Margaret were only in possession of the castle for a few years before the property was seized by the younger Hugh Despenser, a favourite of Edward II of England. Despenser owned the castle from 1325 to 1326, being dispossessed when the king fell from power. The castle was returned to John and Margaret in 1327. It was probably during the time of John and Margaret's son and successor John Sutton II that a chapel and great chamber were added within the castle walls. Following the death of John Sutton II, the castle passed to his wife, Isabel, daughter of John de Cherleton who held it until her death in 1397.

=== Early modern ===
In 1532, another John Sutton inherited the castle but after having money problems, he was ousted by a relative, John Dudley, later Duke of Northumberland, in 1537. John Dudley was the great-grandson of John Sutton, 1st Baron Dudley and had risen to prominence during the reign of Henry VIII. Starting around 1540, a range of new buildings were erected within the older castle walls by him. The architect was William Sharington and the buildings are thus usually referred to as the Sharington Range. According to Historic England, the Sharrington Range represents "one of the earliest known examples of the influence of the Italian Renaissance on the secular architecture of the West Midlands." John Dudley was executed in 1553 for his attempt to set Lady Jane Grey on the throne of England.

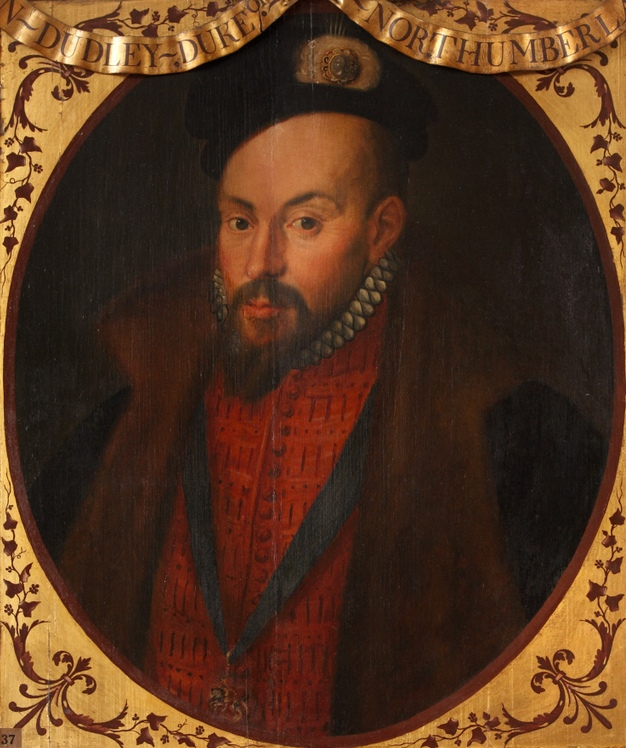
During the Tudor period, John Dudley, 1st Duke of Northumberland, ordered the construction of a range of new buildings within the ancient castle.

The castle was returned to the Sutton family by Queen Mary, ownership being given to Edward Sutton. The castle was visited by Queen Elizabeth I in August 1575 and was considered a possible place of imprisonment for Mary, Queen of Scots. However, the Sutton family were not destined to hold the castle for much longer and Edward Sutton's son, Edward Sutton III, was the last of the male line to possess the property. In 1592, this Edward sent men to raid the property of Gilbert Lyttelton, carrying away cattle which were impounded in the Castle grounds. Financial difficulties continued to mount, however, until Edward Sutton III solved the problem by marrying his granddaughter and heir, Frances Sutton, to Humble Ward, the son of a wealthy merchant.

=== Civil War ===
During the First English Civil War, the castle was held by a Royalist garrison commanded by Colonel Thomas Leveson, a local Catholic who was later one of only 25 former Royalists listed by Parliament in 1651 as subject to 'perpetual banishment and confiscation.'. It was besieged by Parliamentary forces in 1644 and finally surrendered to forces led by Sir William Brereton on 13 May 1646. The castle was partly demolished to prevent it from being used again and the present ruined appearance of the keep results from this decision. However, some habitable buildings remained and were subsequently used occasionally by the Earls of Dudley, although by this time they preferred to reside at Himley Hall, approximately four miles away, when in the Midlands.

=== Final years and ruin ===
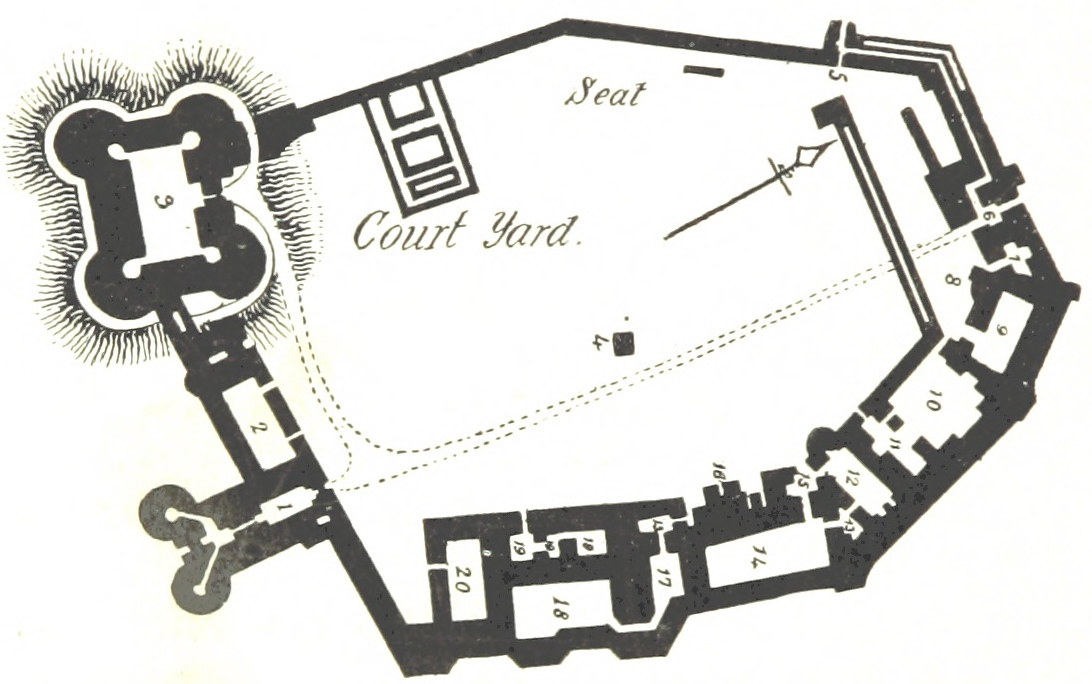
A plan of the castle from 1897

A stable block was constructed on the site at some point before 1700. This was the final building to be constructed in the castle.

In July 1750, a fire (believed to have been accidental) devastated the castle's Tudor residential buildings, leaving the castle a ruin.

In the nineteenth century, the site found a new use as a romantic ruin and a certain amount of tidying up of the site was carried out by the Earls of Dudley. Battlements on one of the remaining towers were reconstructed and two cannon captured during the Crimean War were installed. In the nineteenth and early twentieth century the site was used for fêtes and pageants.

In 1937, Dudley Zoo opened in the castle grounds, the idea for such an attraction having been devised earlier that decade by the castle's owner, William Ward, 3rd Earl of Dudley. The buildings and enclosures were constructed in a modernist style with no attempt to make them blend in with the castle. The zoo remains operational today.

== Location ==
The castle is located on a hill at one end of Dudley Town centre with the entrance (shared with Dudley Zoo) to the grounds off Castle Hill (the A459). The hill is an outcrop of limestone that was extensively quarried during the Industrial Revolution.

Despite being situated on the edge of Dudley town centre, historically, the castle was situated within the borders of Sedgley–which was part of neighbouring Staffordshire rather than Worcestershire as shown by the maps of Christopher Saxton drawn in 1579 and John Speed in 1610. The borders were changed to include the castle and its grounds within the Dudley borough only in 1926 when the restructuring of the boundaries took place to allow the development of the Priory Estate.

== The castle remains ==
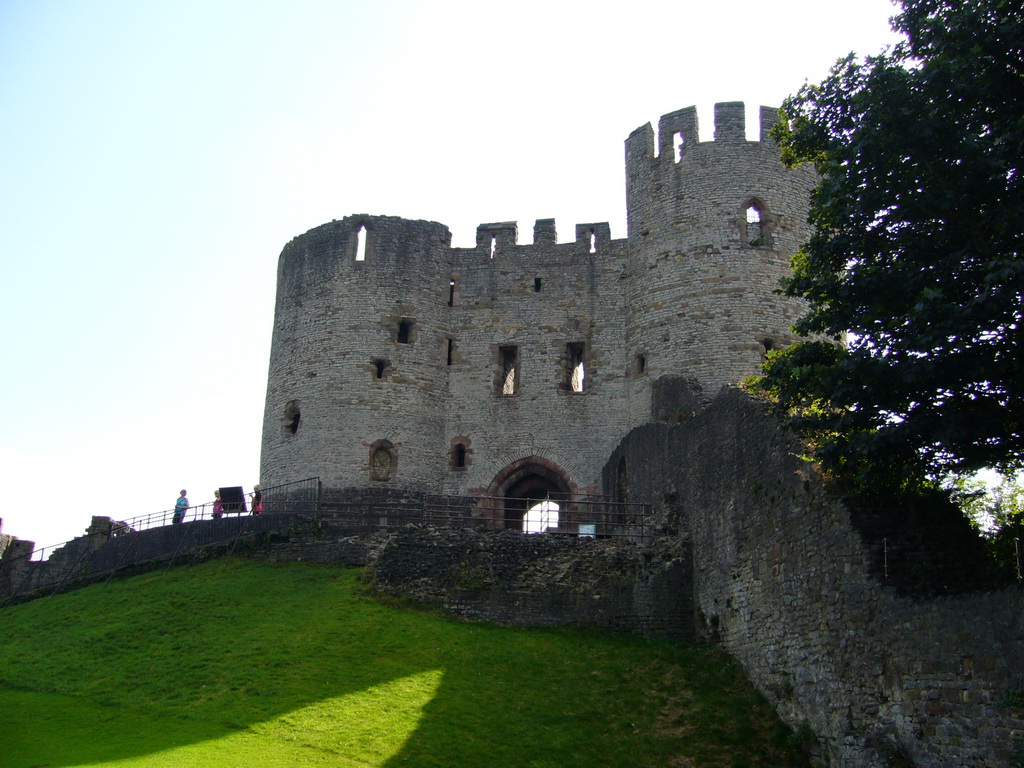
Towers of Dudley Castle

=== Motte and bailey ===
The motte is the oldest remaining structure at the castle site. It originally had a moat at its foot which could have been wet or dry. The motte has a core of limestone rubble encased in clay. It stands around 9 metres high. The oval-shaped bailey, which measures 100 metres north to south and 80 metres east to west is surrounded by a dry moat. In the medieval period, there were probably buildings in an outer court beyond the bailey moat.

=== The keep ===
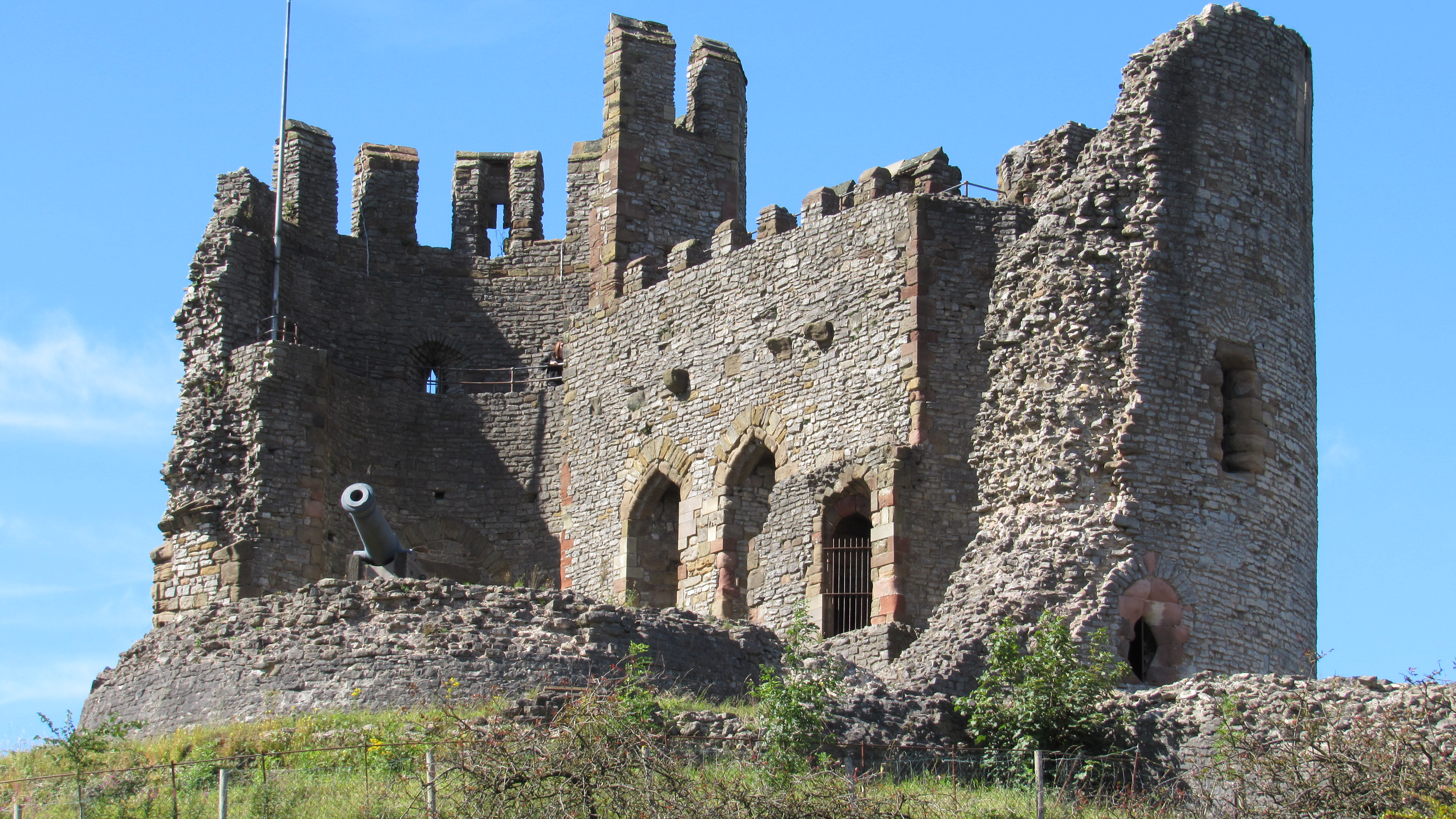
Remains of the Keep

The castle keep dates from the rebuilding that started in 1262. It rests on the motte, constructed in the Norman period but somewhat reduced in height afterwards. The original building was slightly rectangular in plan with approximate dimensions 15 metres north to south and 22 metres east to west. The four drum towers on each corner are 9.8 metres in diameter. After the slighting at the end of the civil war, only the north side of the castle and parts of two of the drum towers remained.

=== Main gatehouse ===
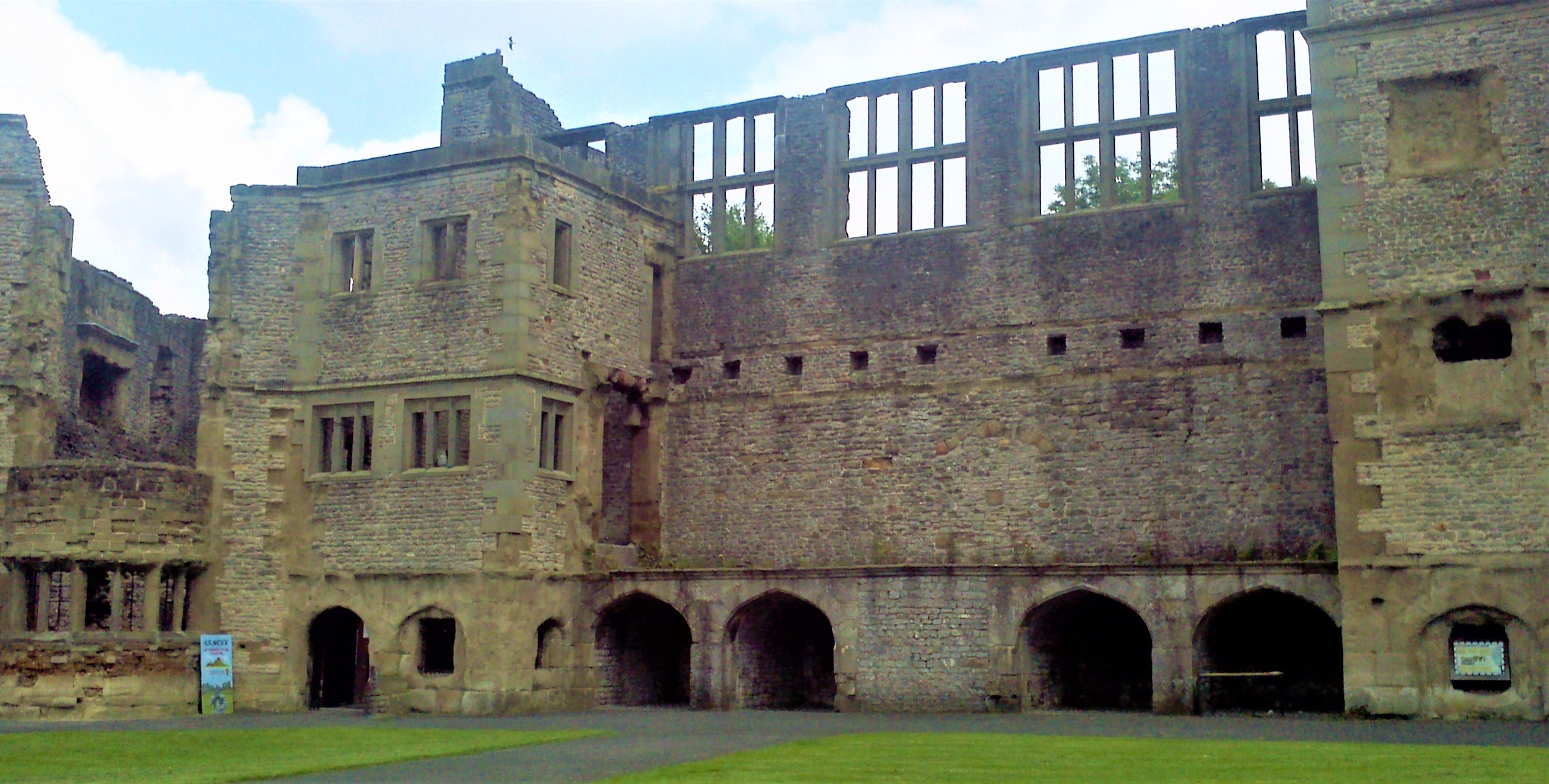
Inner Walls

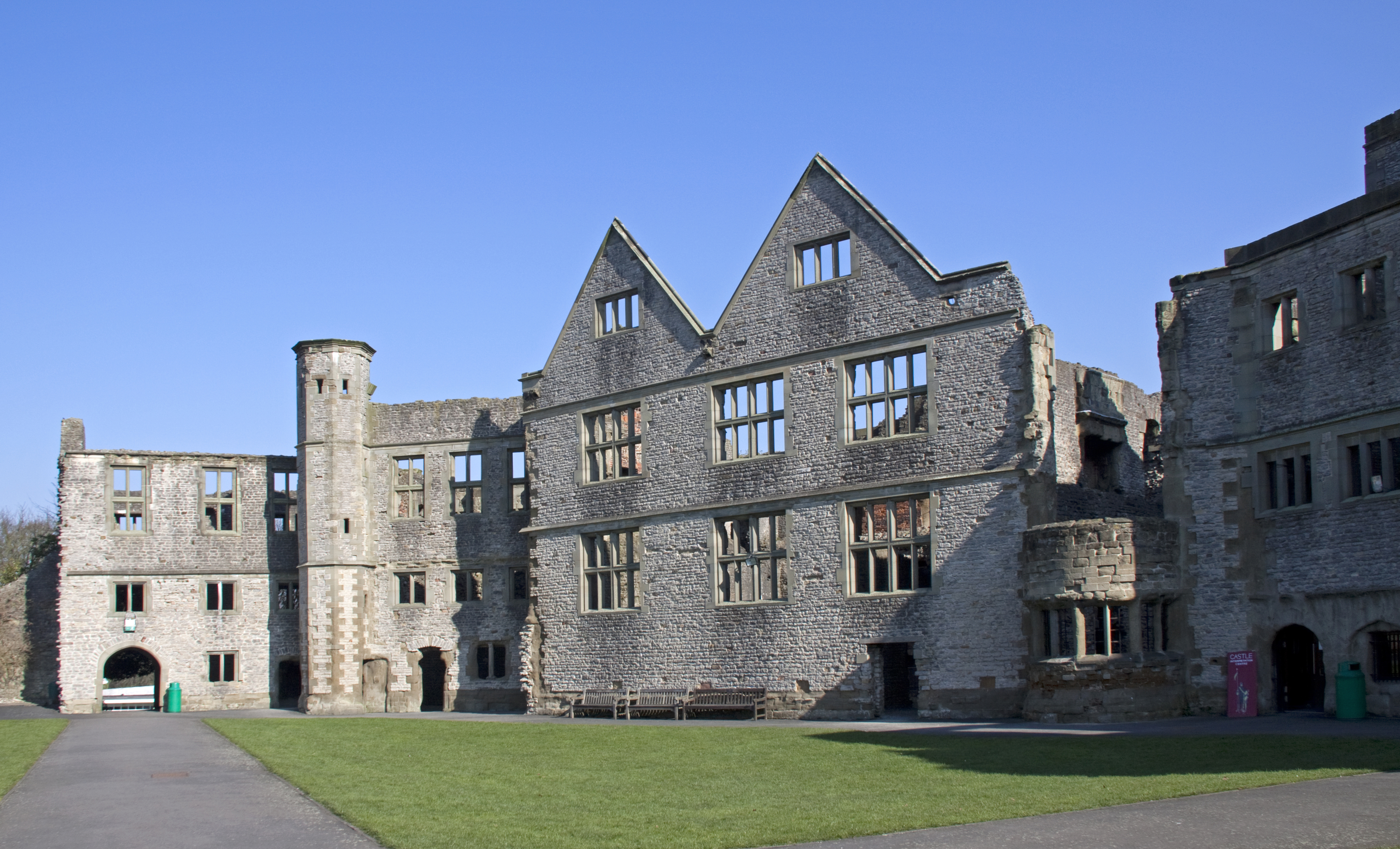
Inner Court

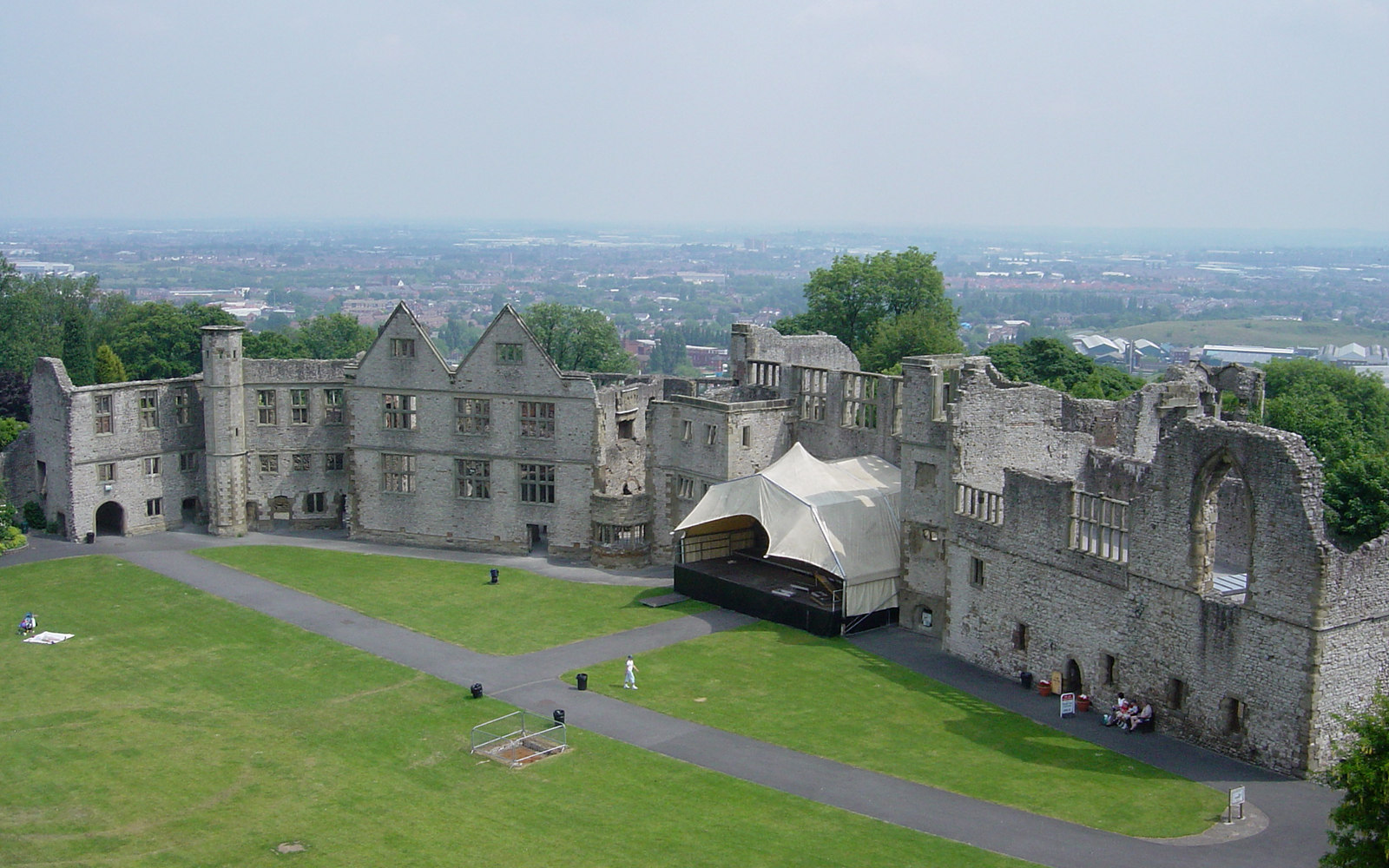
Dudley Castle, view

A little to the east of the keep is the main gatehouse. Like the keep, it was subject to slighting at the end of the Civil War. Some elements of Paganell's Norman castle remain in the structure, but it mainly dates from the rebuilding carried out after 1262 by the de Somery family. A double gateway with two portcullises was constructed at this time. Under the Suttons, a barbican was added to the outside of the gatehouse so that the whole structure was sometimes called the 'Triple Gate'. Originally, the gatehouse was connected to the keep by a thick curtain wall. When built, the gatehouse had three floors with the machinery for operating the portcullises on the first floor and a guardroom on the second floor. Above the guardroom were the battlements.

=== Great chamber and chapel block ===
Probably constructed during the time of John Sutton II but re-modelled in the Tudor era when the Sharington Range was built for John Dudley. The block was in ruins before the fire of 1750.

=== Sharington range ===
Constructed for John Dudley, started around 1540, the three-storey range included a great hall, kitchen, servery, buttery, cellars and bedrooms. A small amount of masonry dating from the early Paganell castle is evident in the ruins. The range was destroyed by the fire of 1750.

=== Stable block ===
Once thought to be lodgings, the stable block was one of the last buildings constructed at the castle site, dating from before 1700. The block is situated between the Main Gate and the base of the motte.

=== Elizabethan gatehouse and east watch tower ===
In front of the main gate but further down the hill is a gatehouse dating from the Elizabethan era. A wall runs to the east of this gate to a round tower, built at the same time, known as the watch tower.

=== Cannon ===
Two Russian cannons brought back as trophies from the Crimean War are installed in prominent positions on the remains of the two south-facing drum towers. The cannons were brought to the castle in June 1857, during one of the Dudley Castle Fêtes.

== Visitor centre ==
The castle visitor centre was opened by Queen Elizabeth II in June 1994, and amongst other exhibits housed a computer-generated reconstruction of the castle as it was in 1550, displayed through hardware that demonstrated an early use of the virtual tour concept.

== Claims of haunting ==
Dudley Castle has the distinction of being haunted. Dudley is believed to be the most haunted Castle in all of England. One of the most frequently sighted supernatural presences at the site is the Grey Lady, believed to be the spirit of Dorothy Beaumont, a woman who died in the Castle, along with her baby, shortly after childbirth. She'd requested to be buried next to her daughter and for her husband to attend the funeral, but neither happened and so it's thought she now wanders the Castle and its grounds.

The ghost of Dorothy can often be seen near the Castle keep and in the pub that was named after her on the Castle grounds, the Grey Lady Tavern. Since opening, there have been many reports here, mostly of unexplained sounds, alarms going off in the middle of the night without explanation, and extreme drops in temperature that are often accompanied by a strange blue mist that floats through the bar.

Currently, it is believed that the most haunted place in the Castle is its underground chapel, where there is an ancient stone coffin which is believed to have contained the body of John Somery, one of the lords of the Castle. Many people reported seeing what are believed to be Somery's legs next to the coffin.

== List of lords of Dudley Castle ==
Dudley Castle was the capital of the feudal barony of Dudley, with several lords over its history:

- Ansculf de Picquigny, a Norman who took part in the Battle of Hastings
- William Fitz-Ansculf, his son
- Fulke Paganell (fl.1100-30)
- Ralph Paganell (fl.1130s-1150s), his son
- Gervase Paganell (d.1194), his son
- Ralph de Somery I (d.1210), son of John de Somery and Hawyse sister and heir of Gervase Paganell
- Ralph de Somery II (c.1193-1216), eldest son of Ralph I
- William Percival de Somery (d.1222), his brother
- Nicholas de Somery (d.1229), still a minor
- Roger de Somery I (d.1225), 3rd son of Ralph I
- Roger de Somery II (d.1272), his son
- Roger de Somery III (c.1254-1291), his son
  - Agnes de Somery (d.1309), his widow and guardian of her son
- John de Somery (1280-1322), their son

On his death, the lands of the barony were divided between his two sisters. Weoley Castle went to Joan de Botetourt and her husband John de Botetourt. Dudley Castle passed to her elder sister Margaret, who had married John de Sutton I. John de Sutton II was summoned to Parliament, but none of his successors were until John de Sutton VI.

- John de Sutton I (d.1327) in the right of Margaret
- John de Sutton II (d.1360), their son
  - Isabel Cherleton de Sutton (d.1397), his widow held Dudley jointly with her son
- John de Sutton III (d.1369), her son - outlived by his mother
- John de Sutton IV (1360-1391), his son - outlived by his grandmother
- John de Sutton V (1380-1406), his son
  - Constance de Sutton (d.1422), his widow
- John Sutton, 1st Baron Dudley 1400-87, their son

For the evolution of the castle and estate until 1740, see Baron Dudley and from the late 17th century until the 20th century as Baron Ward John de Sutton I.

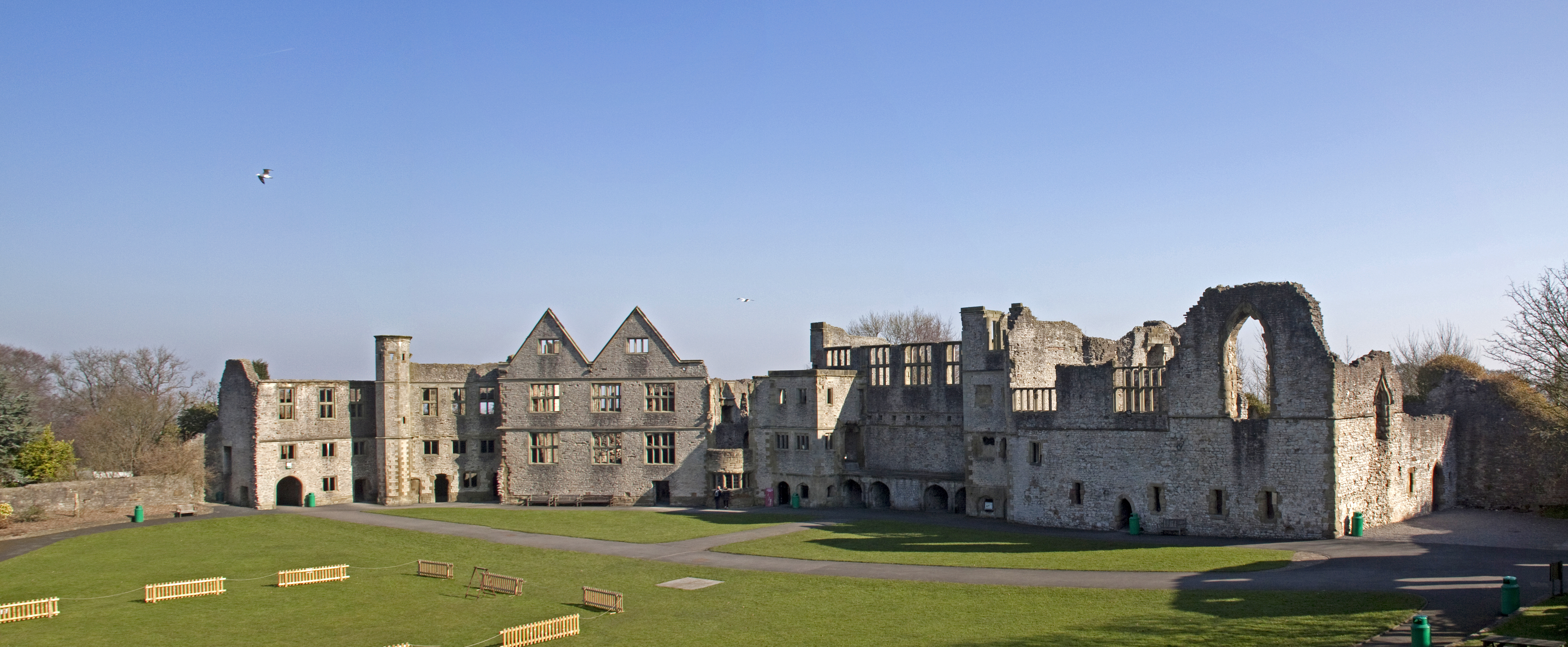
The ruined east range of Dudley Castle. The right-hand block of the range includes the chapel and great chamber. To the left of this is the Tudor period Sharington Range

== See also ==
- Castles in Great Britain and Ireland
- List of castles in England
- Wren's Nest
