= Pensnett Canal =

Canal in West Midlands, England

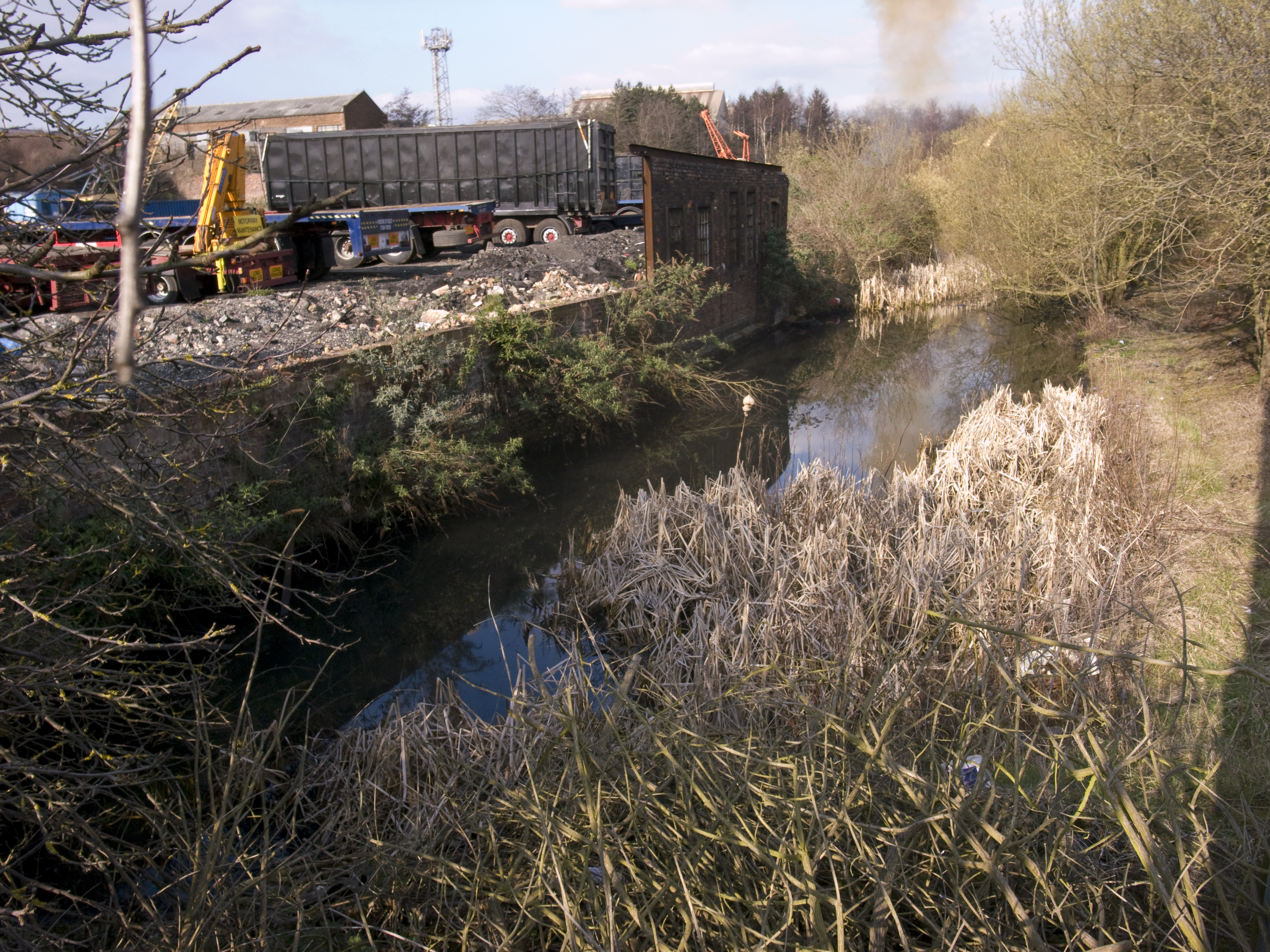
- One of the parts of the canal in water
- Interactive map of Pensnett Canal

Specifications
- Length: 1.25 miles (2.01 km)
- Maximum height above sea level: 473 ft (144 m) (Wolverhampton Level)
- Status: Mostly infilled

History
- Construction began: 1839
- Date completed: 1840
- Date closed: 1950

Geography
- Start point: Parkhead Junction
- End point: Wallows Colliery Basin
- Connects to: Dudley Canal

The Pensnett Canal, also called Lord Ward's Canal, was a private 1.25 miles (2 km) long canal near Brierley Hill, West Midlands, England, which opened in 1840 and served the industrial enterprises of Lord Dudley's Estate. The engineer was Mathew Frost. Since its closure to navigation in 1950, much of it has been lost by overbuilding, but a small section at its junction with the Dudley Canal was restored in 1995, and the section through Brierley Hill remains in water, although it is polluted and not navigable.

== History ==
In the early 1800s, the Earl of Dudley owned a large number of mines, from which coal, ironstone, limestone and fireclay were extracted. Although many were leased to other operators, there was a trend to bring control of them back to a central agency. John William, who had been Earl of Dudley since 1827, died in 1833, and control of his estate passed to his executors, of which the Earl of Stafford was one. The mineral agent at the time was Francis Downing, but he was replaced by Richard Smith in 1836, and it was Smith who built up an industrial empire by taking back control of leasehold properties. This required better transport links, and in 1839 contractors were invited to submit quotations for building the private Pensnett Canal.

The contract for construction was awarded to Matthew Frost, a colliery owner, contractor, land-owner, and surveyor who lived at Bilston. His brother James was also a contractor, who was involved in constructing the Sandhills Branch of the Birmingham Canal and 2 miles (3.2 km) of the Stourbridge Extension Canal at around the same time, but this was one of the first canal projects that Matthew had managed, although he also worked on the Hatherton Branch of the Staffordshire and Worcestershire Canal at the same time. Work is known to have begun by November 1839, and the canal was probably completed in 1840. It was constructed at the 473ft Wolverhampton Level of the Birmingham Canal Navigations, as it joined the Dudley Canal at Parkhead junction, just to the south of the Dudley Tunnel. The junction was a three way affair, with another private branch to the east serving the Blowers Green furnaces of M & W Grazebrook, which was known as the Grazebrook Arm.

As built, the canal was 1.25 miles (2 km) long with no locks. It ran from Parkhead Basin at the southern portal of the Dudley Canal tunnel to the Wallows Wharf to serve the Earl of Dudley's Old Park and Wallows Collieries and the northern part of his (now demolished) Round Oak Ironworks, where a short railway ran to the Staffordshire and Worcestershire Canal. For most of its length, it ran parallel to the Dudley No. 1 Canal, which ran close to the southern part of the Round Oak Ironworks.

Despite the fact that it was soon surrounded by railways, the canal continued in use for about 100 years, and there was an interchange wharf with the railway at its far end. Development took place along its line, which included the building of brickworks, coke ovens and lime kilns. Hartshill Iron Works, on which work began in the late 1840s, was the largest of these developments, and the output from its forges and rolling mills was an important source of traffic for the canal. Much of the traffic was taken to Wallows Wharf, but the canal was also used by railway boats, which carried iron goods to various parts of the Birmingham Canal Navigations, for transshipment to railway wagons. The canal was the location of at least one iron and steel boatbuilding yard. It was owned by Samuel Horton of Netherton, and was listed in a trade catalogue in 1903. As well as building new boats, he carried out repairs at the yard, and had a reputation for good workmanship, which he had built up over 35 years. Horton also made boilers, tanks, colliery tubs and wagons among other iron or steel goods.

Parts of the canal becoming disused in the 1940s, although the section to Harts Hill Iron Company continued to be used until 1950. It was also known as Lord Ward's Branch although there is an identically named branch near the northern portal of the Dudley Tunnel, which is now part of the Black Country Living Museum. Baron Ward was another title of the Earl of Dudley.

=== Remains ===
The canal is mostly unnavigable, having been partly infilled and in many places built upon by industrial premises. A short length, now called Pensnett Basin, runs between Parkhead Junction and an arch of the disused Parkhead Viaduct, where the arch has been closed off. This section was bought from the Lord Dudley's Estate in 1995 by the Dudley Canal Trust. At the time it was filled in, but it was re-excavated and a brick lining constructed. At the same time the Grazebrook Arm was dredged, the towpath bridges were reconstructed, and the towpaths in the area were resurfaced.

Much of the canal within Brierley Hill town centre remains in water. Some of this section is owned by Dudley Metropolitan District Council, and some by C B Brown, who also own nearby industrial units. The water is known to be contaminated, both by discharges from industrial sites, and by fly-tipping. In 2008 the council commissioned the consulting engineers Arup Group to carry out a wide-ranging study of the remains, known as the Pensnett Canal Feasibility Study. Four options were identified, which were to do nothing, to fill in the canal to create additional land for development or green spaces, to fill in parts of the canal, and to restore and retain the whole of the remaining watered section. The report also suggested that how the canal was treated could act as a catalyst for development in the area.

There is no further access to the former canal although a public footpath follows a short distance over the course between factories. The course of the canal can also be observed from a number of road bridges.

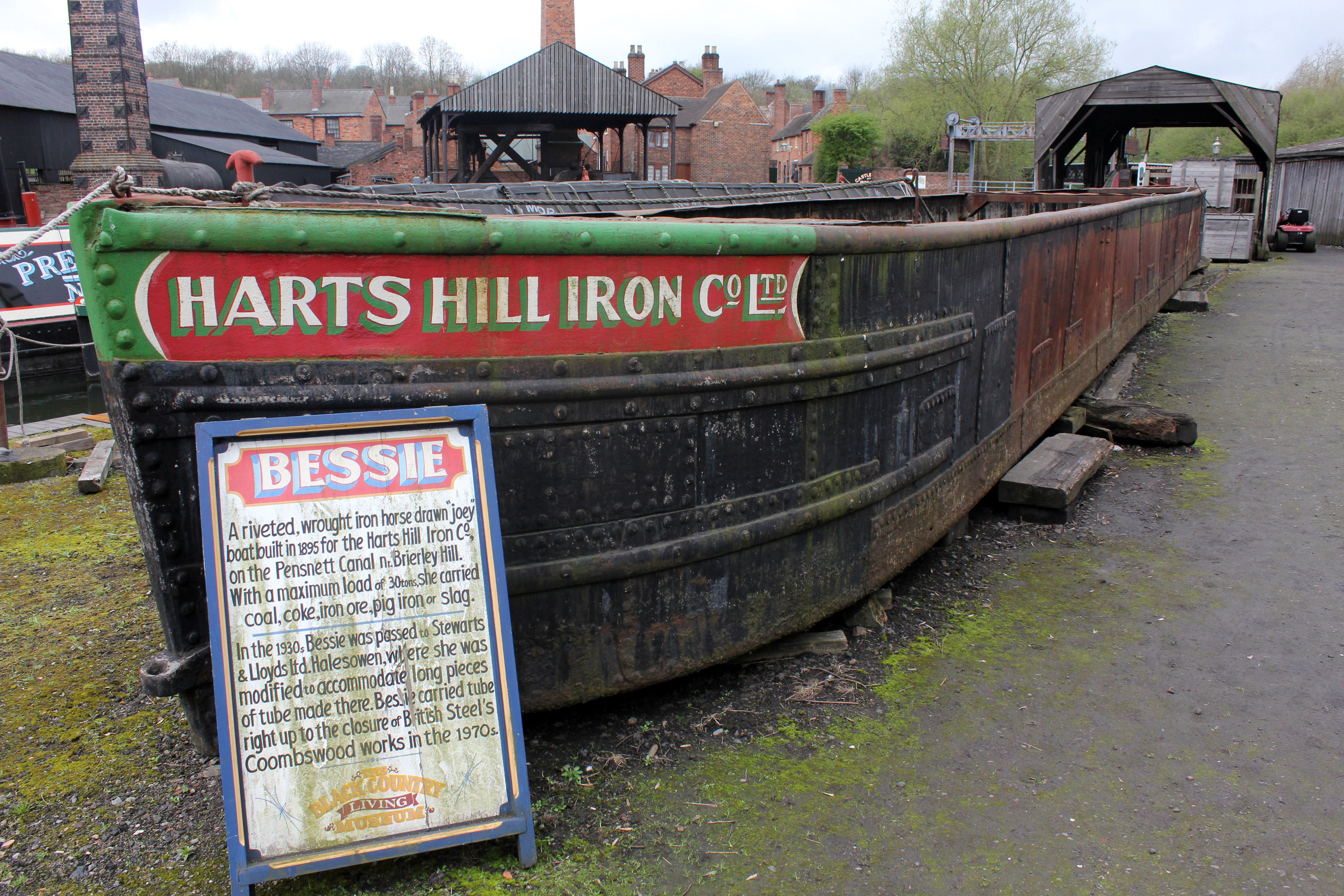
Bessie, the surviving Harts Hill Iron barge

The Harts Hill Iron Works ran a fleet of boats based on the canal, which amounted to some 40 vessels during the life of the works. One of their boats, built of wrought iron in 1895, either in the dock at the works or at Noah Hingley's dock at Withymore, has survived. Originally numbered 17, it became number 18 and acquired the name Bessie at some point. Ownership passed to Stewarts and Lloyds of Halesowen some time probably in the late 1920s or early 1930s, and it worked at the Coombeswood Tube Works, becoming their number 112. After the works closed in the 1970s, British Steel donated the vessel to the Black Country Living Museum in 1976.

== Points of interest ==
Point	Coordinates (Links to map resources)	OS Grid Ref	Notes
Start. Junction with Dudley Canal at Parkhead Basin	52.49956°N 2.10004°W	SO93208911	
Limit of navigation in Pensnett Basin	52.49868°N 2.09984°W	SO93228902	
Parkhead Viaduct	52.49851°N 2.09978°W	SO93228900	
East end of public footpath between factories	52.49292°N 2.10338°W	SO92988838	
West end of public footpath between factories. Pedmore Road bridge.	52.4922°N 2.1058°W	SO92818830	
Canal used as industrial cooling pool	52.49223°N 2.10550°W	SO92838830	
Rail bridge	52.49195°N 2.11069°W	SO92488827	
Canal Street bridge	52.49099°N 2.11276°W	SO92348816	
Site of Round Oak Steelworks	52.4886°N 2.1166°W	SO920879	
Site of Harthill Iron Works	52.4915°N 2.1125°W	SO92368822	
A461 Dudley Road bridge	52.49020°N 2.11800°W	SO91988807	
Terminus (approx). The Wallows, Hope Works, start of Mineral Railway to Stourbridge Canal.	52.4908°N 2.1199°W	SO91858814	
Terminus (approx) of Mineral Railway by Stourbridge Canal	52.4936°N 2.1289°W	SO9125884	

== Bibliography ==
- Hadfield, Charles (1985). The Canals of the West Midlands. David and Charles. ISBN 978-0-7153-8644-6.
- Paget-Tomlinson, Edward (2006). Canal and River Navigations (3rd ed.). Landmark Publishing. ISBN 978-1-84306-207-3.
- Shill, Ray (1996). The Industrial Canal - Volume 1 The Coal Trade. Three Spires Print and Design. ISBN 978-0-9517755-5-4.
- Shill, Ray (30 May 2010). "Pensnett Canal". Birmingham Canal Navigations Society. Archived from the original on 4 March 2016.
- Skempton, Sir Alec; et al. (2002). A Biographical Dictionary of Civil Engineers in Great Britain and Ireland: Vol 1: 1500 to 1830. Thomas Telford. ISBN 978-0-7277-2939-2.
- Workman, John (7 August 2019). "A quartet of Black Country boatbuilders". Black Country Bugle.
