= Roger de Somery II =

Feudal barony of Dudley

- Born: before 1235
- Died: 1272
- Occupation: Baron of Dudley
- Known for: re-fortification of Dudley Castle
- Spouse(s): Nichola; Amabil
- Children: 1 son, 4 daughters; 2 sons
- Parents: Ralph de Somery I (father); Margaret le Gras (mother)

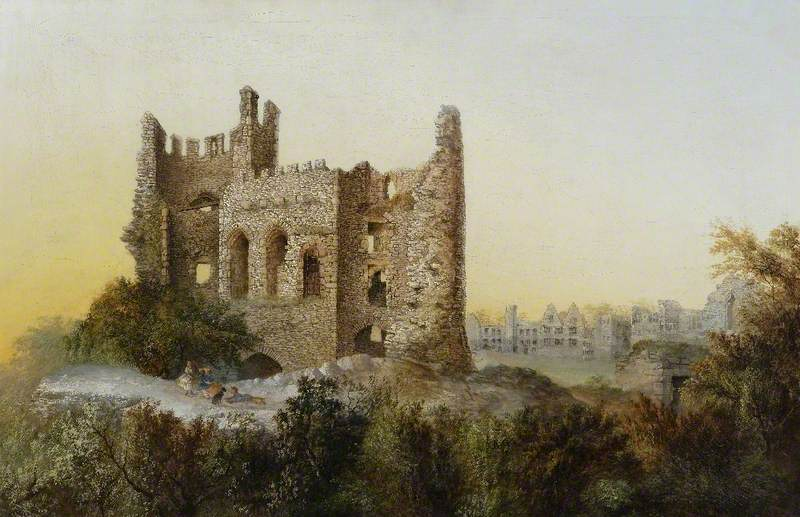
Painting of Dudley Castle by Sydney Herbert

Roger de Somery (before 1235 – 1272) was a feudal baron in England. He inherited the feudal barony of Dudley in 1235. In 1262, Roger started the re-fortification of Dudley Castle, which had been slighted by order of King Henry II after a rebellion in 1173-1174. Roger married twice and died in 1272.

== Biography ==
Roger de Somery was the son of Ralph de Somery (d 1210) and Margaret le Gras (liv 1247), feudal baron of Dudley. He inherited the barony in 1235. His granduncle, baron Gervase Paganell, was the husband of Countess Isabel de Beaumont, daughter of Robert de Beaumont, 2nd Earl of Leicester. He also attended the coronation of Richard the Lionheart in 1189.

In 1253, the king sent Roger on an expedition to Gascony to help quell a rebellion. In 1262, Roger began to re-fortify Dudley Castle, which had been slighted by order of King Henry II after the revolt of 1173–74. However, as he did not have a licence from the king to rebuild the castle, he was ordered to stop the construction work.

A licence was subsequently obtained and refortification resumed although the castle was not finished in his lifetime. Roger married twice, first to Nichola Albini/d'Aubigny (daughter of William de d'Aubigny, 3rd Earl of Arundel) and secondly to Amabel Chacombe. He died in 1272.

By his wife Nichola, he had the following children:

- Ralph de Somery, predeceased his father, died without male heirs (d 1273-1282)
- Margaret de Somery m Ralph Cromwell and Ralph Basset
- Joan de Somery m John le Strange; they were the parents of John le Strange, 1st Baron Strange of Knockyn
- Mabel de Somery m Walter de Sully
- Matilda/Maud de Somery m Henry de Erdington

By his wife Amabil, he had 2 sons:

- Roger de Somery
- Percival de Somery
