= John Manners =

John Manners may refer to:

== Dukes ==
- John Manners, 1st Duke of Rutland (1638–1711)
- John Manners, 2nd Duke of Rutland (1676–1721)
- John Manners, 3rd Duke of Rutland (1696–1779)
- John Manners, 5th Duke of Rutland (1778–1857)
- John Manners, 7th Duke of Rutland (1818–1896), better known as Lord John Manners in his role as a 19th-century statesman
- John Manners, 9th Duke of Rutland (1886–1980)

== Other nobles ==
- John Manners, 4th Earl of Rutland (c. 1552 – 1588)
- John Manners, 8th Earl of Rutland (1604–1679)
- John Manners, Marquess of Granby (1721–1770), military officer, son of the 3rd Duke of Rutland

== Others ==
- John Manners (died 1438), MP for Northumberland (UK Parliament constituency)
- John Manners (died 1611), MP for Nottinghamshire (UK Parliament constituency)
- John Manners (English politician) (1730–1792), politician
- John Manners Tollemache (c. 1768 – 1837), born John Manners, son of the above
- John Manners (American politician) (1786–1853), physician and president of the New Jersey Senate
- J. Hartley Manners (1870–1928), British playwright
- John Manners (cricketer) (1914–2020), British naval officer and cricketer
- John Neville Manners (1892–1914), played cricket for Eton College
- Jack Manners (Canadian football) (1914–1986), Canadian football player
- Jack Manners (footballer) (1877–1946), English footballer

== See also ==
- John Manners-Sutton (disambiguation)
