= John Sutton V =

English noble (1380–1406)

Sir John de Sutton V (February 1380 – 28 August 1406) was the 4th Baron Sutton of Dudley and heir to Dudley Castle. He was the son of Sir John de Sutton IV, 3rd Baron Sutton, and Joan (d. 1408). John married Constance Blount (d. 11 October 1432), daughter of Sir Walter le Blount of Barton who was killed at the Battle of Shrewsbury in c.1402, whose death was immortalized by Shakespeare.

John V is a descendant of the first Lord Dudley, Sir John de Sutton II (c. 1310–1359) the first to be summoned to the Parliament of England as Baron Sutton in 1342. From 1397 to 1406, John V held lands derived from the Earls of Powis, upon the death of his great grandmother Isabel de Cherleton. In 1401, during the second year of King Henry IV of England's reign, John V did homage for the lands, including Castle Dudley. After John V's death, the Blounts had a stake in Dudley lands when his mother-in-law, Sancha de Ayala (d.1418), took custody of his first child John VI, who was age six, as well as being granted John V's valuable estates. Widowed, Constance was eventually sued by Robert Erghom for her dower in the King's chancery by which she defaulted several times on the King's grant of Dudley manor.

John V was succeeded by John Sutton VI, 1st Baron Dudley. By Constance, his other children included Thomas Sutton of Dudley, Jane Sutton of Dudley (who married Thomas Mainwaring) and Elizabeth Sutton of Dudley. He is also said to have had a child, Humphrey Dudley.
