= John Manners-Sutton =

John Manners-Sutton may refer to:

- John Manners-Sutton (1752–1826), MP
- John Manners-Sutton (1822–1898), MP, grandson of the above
- John Manners-Sutton, 3rd Viscount Canterbury (1814–1877), British politician and colonial administrator
- John Manners-Sutton, 3rd Baron Manners (1852–1927)

== See also ==
- John Manners (disambiguation)
- John Sutton (disambiguation)
