= Dudley Tunnel =

Canal tunnel on the Dudley Canal

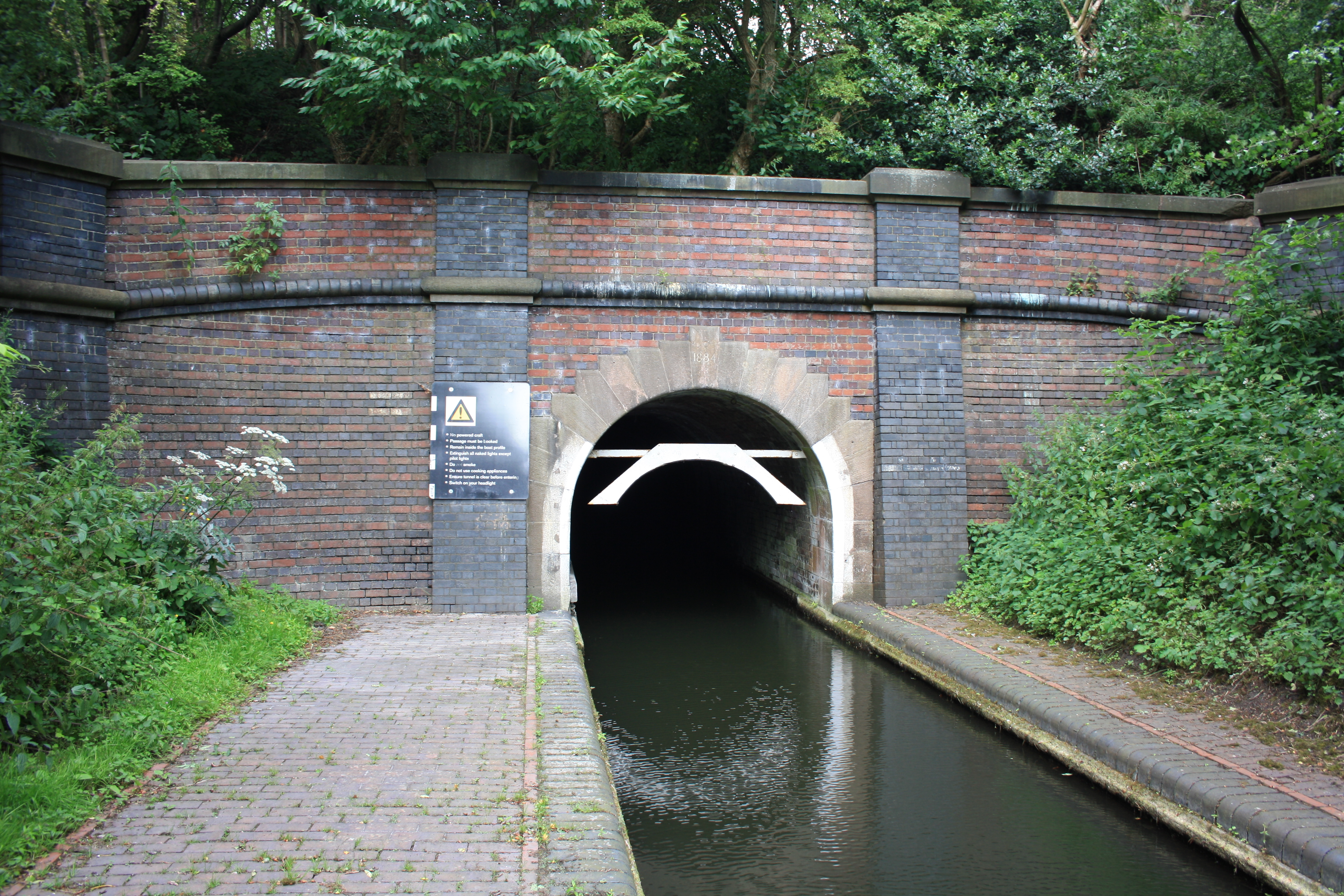
- Interactive map of Dudley Tunnel

Overview
- Location: Dudley, West Midlands, England
- Coordinates: 52.517544°N 2.086741°W
- OS grid reference: SO942910
- Status: Part-open
- Waterway: Dudley Canal No 1 Line
- Start: 52.52317°N 2.07908°W
- End: 52.50110°N 2.10086°W

Operation
- Constructed: 1775–1791
- Opened: 25 June 1791
- Owner: Canal & River Trust

Technical
- Length: 3,172 yards (2,900.5 m)
- Towpath: No
- Boat-passable: No

Location of Dudley Tunnel in the West Midlands

Dudley Tunnel is a canal tunnel on the Dudley Canal Line No 1, England. At about 3,172 yards (2,900.5 m) long, it is now the second longest canal tunnel on the UK canal network today. (Standedge Tunnel is the longest, at 5,456 yards (4,989.0 m), and the 3,931 yards (3,594.5 m) Higham and Strood tunnel is now rail only.) However, since the Dudley Tunnel is not continuous this status is sometimes questioned: (the main tunnel is 2,942 yards (2,690.2 m), Lord Ward's tunnel is 196 yards (179.2 m) and Castle Mill basin is 34 yards (31.1 m)).

In 1959 the British Transport Commission sought to close the tunnel but this led to an Inland Waterways Association-organised massed protest cruise in 1960. The tunnel was however closed in 1962; and was further threatened with permanent closure by British Railways who wished to replace a railway viaduct at the Tipton portal with an embankment and a culvert. However, this never happened as the railway was closed in 1968 and the disused bridge demolished in the 1990s.

The tunnel was reopened in 1973, as a result of restoration, which had been a collaboration between local volunteers (originally the Dudley Canal Tunnel Preservation Society, later the Dudley Canal Trust), and the local authority, Dudley Borough Council. The opening ceremony was advertised as "TRAD 1973 – Tunnel Reopening at Dudley".

== Construction of the tunnels ==
When the Dudley Canal Act 1776 (16 Geo. 3. c. 66) to construct a canal near Dudley was obtained in 1776, it did not include Dudley Tunnel. It authorised a route that started in two fields called Great Ox Leasow and Little Ox Leasow, a little to the south of the tunnel site near Peartree Lane in Dudley, and ran southwards to an end-on junction with the Stourbridge Canal, authorised by a separate act on the same day. The principal shareholders included Lord Dudley and Ward and Thomas Talbot Foley. Shareholders had contributed the authorised capital of £7,000 by July 1778, and the canal was completed on 14 June 1779, at a total cost of £9,700. The Stourbridge Canal opened in December.

Quite separately, Lord Dudley and Ward was mining limestone in the Castle Mill and Wren's Next area, further to the north. This was brought up to the surface, and transported overland. In 1775, he started building a private canal, which branched from the 473 ft Wolverhampton Level of the Birmingham Canal at Tipton, and reached Tipton Colliery through a tunnel. This was known as Lord Dudley and Ward's branch, and the first phase was completed by 1 June 1778. It was later extended to Castle Mill, where a basin was constructed.

The Dudley Canal and Stourbridge Canal then looked at an extension northwards from Dudley, to join the Birmingham Canal. This would involve a long tunnel, and Lord Dudley and Ward agreed to sell his branch canal and tunnel to the company. The enterprise was authorised by another act of Parliament, the Dudley Canal Act 1785 (25 Geo. 3. c. 87), obtained in July 1785, which was steered through the parliamentary process by Lord Dudley and Ward. He was thanked for his efforts, but the company argued that he received sufficient benefit from the convenience of the Dudley Canal and the favourable tolls awarded to him, that payment for his branch canal should not be made, and it never was. The Dudley Canal Act 1785 authorised the company to build five locks to the north of their existing canal, to reach Parkhead, and a long tunnel to link up with Lord Dudley and Ward's Castle Mill Basin. The route was surveyed by John Snape and John Bull, and was checked by Thomas Dadford. He then became the consulting engineer for the project, while Abraham Lees supervised the day-to-day work. In September 1785, the company announced that the tunnel would be 9 feet 3 inches (2.82 m) wide, the water would be 5 feet 6 inches (1.68 m) deep, and there would be headroom of 7 feet (2.1 m).

John Pinkerton, one of a family of respected canal contractors, was awarded the contract for construction of the tunnel, but it was the first time he had worked on a tunnel, and he hit problems, first with the quality of the ground he was trying to excavate, and also with the large volumes of groundwater that he encountered. There were complaints about his lack of progress and the poor quality of the brick lining, resulting in him being dismissed in 1787. He had to pay £2,000, which was an amount agreed as a bond when the contract was awarded, after which there was an interlude, while arguments were resolved. The tunnelling was then supervised by Isaac Pratt, one of the Stourbridge and Dudley committee members, with Abraham Lees continuing as resident engineer. In May 1789, there were more difficulties, when it was realised that the tunnel had deviated from its proper line in several places, and that progress was slow. Isaac Pratt ceased supervising the work on 30 May 1789, and Josiah Clowes was employed as engineer from early June, aided by John Gunnery. Gunnery died in December 1791, and a newspaper article announced that the tunnel he had been working on was complete. The work included a stop lock in the tunnel where it joined Lord Dudley and Ward's basin, and a new straighter section and junction with the Birmingham Canal at the north end. The new junction opened on 6 March 1792, but the tunnel was not formally announced as being complete until 25 June.

=== Operation ===
The stop lock in the tunnel did not last for long, and was removed in December 1795. There were initially complaints, because the tunnels were used by limestone boats working the quarries, as well as being a through route. Normal passage was often obstructed by boats loading limestone at Charles Starkey's Quarry, by empty boats blocking the tunnel, and by full boats blocking access to the stop lock into the Birmingham Canal. Such complaints ceased after 1799, presumably because more space was made for the limestone boats, and their organisation was better regulated. More serious was that the tunnel was affected by mining subsidence, and the regular closure for repairs damaged trade. The company employed their own Inspector of Mines to keep on top of the situation. Boats could pass in one direction for four hours, and then the direction was reversed, but in 1830, the time allowed was reduced to three hours, with a penalty imposed if the time was exceeded.

With threats of competition from the proposed Stourbridge, Wolverhampton and Birmingham Junction Canal in May 1836, the company looked at ways in which passage through the tunnel could be improved. They decided to enforce a by-law that required each boat to have a crew of two men to propel it through the tunnel, and a number of boatmen were called to account for non-compliance. The Dudley Canal's superintendent, Thomas Brewin, suggested that cable haulage could resolve the issues, but the cost of the system at £6,000 was deemed to be too expensive. Despite the commercial difficulties, the tunnels were very popular with sightseers, and poetic descriptions of its operation appeared in Luke Booker's Dudley Castle, published in 1825, and W Harris's Rambles about Dudley Castle, published in 1843.

Having completed the Dudley Tunnel, the company did not rest, but pressed on with another ambitious extension, linking the southern end of the tunnel to the Worcester and Birmingham Canal passing through the Lapal Tunnel near Selly Oak. This was completed by 28 May 1798, and the original canal and tunnel became known as the Dudley Canal Line No 1 or the Dudley No 1 Canal, to distinguish it from the new venture. The Birmingham Canal, known as the Birmingham Canal Navigations since 1794, had suggested amalgamating with the Dudley Canal in 1813, but nothing further took place. A second approach was made in 1845, and in the face of competition from the proposed Oxford, Worcester and Wolverhampton Railway, as well as the plans of the Birmingham Canal Navigations, they agreed to the merger on 8 October. The Birmingham and Dudley Canal Consolidation Act 1846 (9 & 10 Vict. c. cclxix) was obtained to authorise the amalgamation, and the Dudley Tunnel became part of the Birmingham Canal Navigations system from 27 July 1846.

Despite its diminutive size, some 41,000 boats passed through the tunnel in 1853. Birmingham Canal Navigations began looking at ways in which its capacity could be improved, but all of them were rejected. Instead they elected to build a new tunnel, running roughly parallel to the Dudley Tunnel and beginning on the Dudley Canal Line No 2 some 2 miles (3.2 km) to the east. Work began on 31 December 1855, when the first sod was cut, and Netherton Tunnel opened on 20 August 1858. It was 27 feet (8.2 m) wide and 16 feet (4.9 m) above water level, with towpaths on both sides. From the beginning, it was lit by gas lights, later replaced by electric lighting.

Subsidence at the southern end got sufficiently bad that the tunnel was closed in 1884, to allow a section to be rebuilt. Around 200 yards (180 m) were reconstructed, to dimensions that were considerably larger than the original bore. At the end of the new section, the size of the tunnel suddenly reduces to the original size, and a warning gauge is fitted at the tunnel mouth, to prevent false impressions of the size of boat that can pass through the tunnel. The work was completed in time for it to be reopened on 23 April 1885.

=== Closure ===
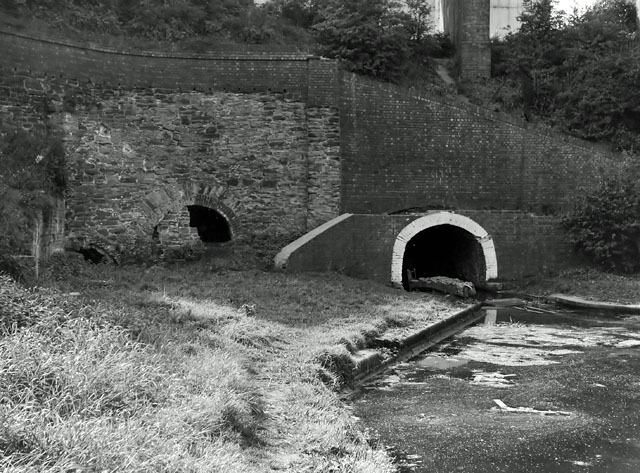
The northern portal in 1964, when the tunnel was officially closed

By 1959, the tunnel was virtually disused, with no significant traffic having passed through it in the 1950s, and British Waterways announced plans to close it officially. A number of protest groups organised cruises through the tunnel during 1960 in the hope of it being kept open, but British Waterways at the time were intent on closing much of the canal network. A paper called The Future of our Inland Waterways, presented on 3 November 1961 by W I Ives, a senior official within the organisation, called for changes in the law to make it much easier to close redundant canals. When the British Transport Commission presented their annual bill to Parliament in November 1961, it included proposals to close ten waterways immediately, of which the Dudley Canal and Tunnel were one. While there was an assurance that no action would be taken that would adversely affect the possibility of navigation on three of them, the Dudley Tunnel did not fall into this category. Protests by the Inland Waterways Association and the Inland Waterways Preservation Society were rejected, and the Dudley Canal Branch closed in 1962.

The following year, the viaduct that carried the Stourbridge to Wolverhampton railway line over the northern portal of the tunnel at Tipton was found to be structurally unsound. The line was largely a goods line since the closure of passenger stations along it from 30 July 1962, but the railway authorities planned to preserve the railway line and wanted to replace the viaduct with an embankment, which would have sealed off the northern portal. However, the railway closed completely in 1968 as part of the Beeching cuts, and so the tunnel mouth remained accessible.

=== Reopening ===
Despite the fact that it was officially closed, Vic Smallshire and some colleagues decided to travel through the tunnel and return via the Netherton Tunnel. However, when they got to Park Head, the three locks down to the No 2 Line had been damaged by British Waterways to prevent navigation, and while returning through the Dudley Tunnel, he found a message in a bottle. He made contact with the writers, John Westwood and Cliff Sherwood, and plans to rescue the tunnel were soon drawn up. Regular trips were made through the tunnels on Sundays, and when barriers were erected at the tunnel ends, these were removed with crowbars, sledge hammers and ropes. The Dudley Tunnel Committee was formed, co-ordinating interest in its plight within the local community. Smallshire wrote an 8-page article about the need to preserve the tunnel for the Inland Waterways Association, and there was widespread interest in the concept.

The committee was approached by the Workers Educational Association, to arrange a trip into the tunnels. After a date was agreed, Dr John Fletcher, their regional officer, contacted the press and invited anyone who was interested to come on a last chance trip to see the tunnels, and some 300 people arrived for the trip. A second boat was hastily borrowed, and 150 people were crammed into each of the two boats for the trip. Afterwards, Fletcher warned that the group urgently needed to become official, which resulted in the formation of the Dudley Canal Tunnel Preservation Society on 1 January 1964. The Society soon had several hundred members, and British Waterways had to acknowledge them. They were also talking to Dudley Council about the concept of an industrial museum for the Black Country. The Council called a public meeting, where the museum concept was greeted enthusiastically, and they started planning for the project. The Society then became the Dudley Canal Trust, and expanded its vision to include the Park Head locks, the basins at the north end of the tunnel which are now part of the museum, and the environs of the Dudley Canal in general.

Official attitudes to the waterways changed as the 1960s progressed, and in 1968 the government announced the membership of the Inland Waterways Amenity Advisory Committee, which included members from the Inland Waterways Association. Between June and December its members visited seven canals to discuss their future with local organisations, of which Dudley Tunnel was one. The Society renamed itself to the Dudley Canal Trust in 1970, and began restoration work, borrowing equipment from British Waterways, Dudley Council and local contractors. Further impetus came in 1971 with the publication of Birmingham Canal Navigations, a report produced by the BCN Working Party. This was presented to British Waterways, and suggested that 66 miles (106 km) of the network of 80 miles (130 km) of the BCN which had been effectively abandoned by being classified as "Remainder Waterways" in 1968 had a viable future. These were divided into four groups, with priority 1 and 2 canals requiring no major expenditure to return them to navigation. Dudley Canal Branch was a priority 3 canal, but restoration plans were produced, with the work partly financed by the local authorities in which it was located.

=== Development ===
The project was aided by the organisation of a "big dig" in collaboration with the Waterway Recovery Group. The event took place in 1970, and 300 volunteers arrived at Park Head, to undertake restoration work. Their work was widely publicised. In early 1972, following successful agreements to restore the Ashton Canal, the Peak Forest Canal and the Caldon Canal, Dudley Corporation became the first local authority to finance canal restoration when they announced that they would fund half of the repair costs for the tunnel branch, as well as landscaping the derelict land at Park Head, around the southern end of the tunnel. The fact that the tunnel remained open also meant that they did not have to spend millions of pounds on a storm water drainage system.

The canals at both ends of the tunnel were dredged, as were the basins within the tunnels, resulting in the removal of some 50,000 tons of mud and debris. The locks to the south of the tunnel were restored, with help from British Waterways and Dudley Borough Council, and the first boat reached the tunnel portal. At Easter 1973, the tunnel was reopened, an event that drew 300 boats to the celebrations, and some 14,000 visitors. The trust began running trip boats into the tunnel, which were moved by legging, but as this was very tiring for the crews, the boat was converted to use battery power in 1975, and became the first electric powered narrow boat to carry passengers in the country.

In 1977 the Manpower Services Commission announced its Job Creation Scheme, through which they funded various projects which would create employment. One project that benefitted from this was the first phase of the Black Country Museum project at the northern portal of the tunnel. A short canal arm was restored, and the electric trip boat was stabled within the museum complex. In August 1977, the Dudley Canal Trust celebrated the fact that 25,000 visitors had been carried into the tunnel by the trip boat since 1964, and on 1 October 1977, phase one of the museum opened,

Subsidence some 440 yards (400 m) from the south end of the tunnel resulted in it closing again in 1979, although boat trips into the caverns from the museum were not affected by this. It took over a decade to find the funds to repair the damage, but grants from the European Regional Development Fund and other agencies enabled the original brick lining to be removed from a 110-yard (100 m) section, to be replaced by a concrete tube cast in situ. The work cost £730,000, and was part of a larger project to improve towpaths in the area, with the total cost being £1.8 million. The restored tunnel was reopened in 1992, 200 years after it first opened for traffic. The Trust had hoped that it would be possible to fix other points where the roof was particularly low, but there were insufficient funds for that.

The Trust commissioned the construction of a new tunnel in 1984, running between the main tunnel and the Rock Tunnel, in order to provide access to the Singing Cavern. The cavern was formally opened to the public on 23 April 1985 by Neil MacFarlane MP and John Wilson, chairman of the MEB. By 1987, the number of visitors wanting boat trips meant that it was necessary to create a round trip route through the caverns. A connection was made between the Singing Cavern and the Little Tess cavern, by excavating part of the blocked Rock Tunnel, and a new tunnel was built, to link Little Tess cavern to Castle Mill basin. The work was completed in 1990, and the circular route was formally opened by councillor D H Sparkes, chairman of Dudley Economic Development Committee on 25 April. By 2004, between 80,000 and 90,000 visitors were visiting the tunnels each year.

At the south end of the tunnel there was once a triple junction, where the Pensnett Canal and the Grazebrook Arm both joined the main canal. This was reinstated in 1995, when the Grazebrook Arm was dredged. A small part of the line of the filled-in Pensnett Canal was bought from the Lord Dudley's Estate, and a brick lining was constructed as it was excavated. The work included rebuilding the bridges which crossed the two arms, and resurfacing of towpaths in the area. Because of its limited size, boats using the tunnel must not use diesel engines, and the Trust used to use a trip boat to tow them through, but in 1996 they commissioned a purpose built electric tug, so that they did not lose the use of a trip boat. It is named John C Brown after the British Waterways engineer who oversaw the reconstruction of the tunnel in 1992, and it has a diesel engine connected to a generator to allow the batteries to be recharged when not in the tunnel.

The Trust were given use of the disused Blowers Green Pumphouse at the foot of Park Head locks in 1996, and converted it to become offices and an education centre with workshops and stores attached. By 2012, they had funding in place for a permanent headquarters at Todd's End Field, on which work started in 2015. The complex, known as "The Portal", was formally opened by Princess Anne on 4 March 2016. Blowers Green Pumphouse is still used for social functions and storage.

=== Route ===
The earliest part of tunnel system was built to help with the transport of limestone extracted from the mines inside Castle Hill through which the tunnel runs. This was Lord Ward's tunnel, which leads to Castle Mill Basin. From there the main tunnel runs, via the Cathedral Arch, to Parkhead, near Netherton. At Cathedral Arch a branch canal led into the Little Tess Cavern mine workings. This route is now blocked, but has been by-passed by two new tunnels. The southern end, including the southern portal, of the tunnel had to be rebuilt in 1884 due to subsidence caused by adjacent coal mines. This section of the tunnel was built several feet wider than the original tunnel bore. The southern portal bears a brick date stone of 1884.

Another 1,227-yard (1,122 m) canal tunnel at Castle Mill Basin, now blocked off by a dam, leads under Wren's Nest to two underground basins, east basin and west basin, and was used to transport limestone from the underground mine workings. Surface quarries were also opened; they outlasted the underground workings and were last used in the early 1920s. The land above the underground workings, together with the surface quarries, became a National Nature Reserve.

== Dudley Tunnel today ==
The two portals of the tunnel are near Birmingham New Road and Duncan Edwards Way (see coordinates below). The restrictive dimensions of the tunnel and the absence of a towpath mean that many boats are unable to pass through it. Those that can are not allowed to use diesel engines due to the lack of ventilation in the tunnel.

Visitors may take a battery-powered narrowboat trip operated by Dudley Canal Trust either through the tunnel or partway through the tunnel and the adjacent mines; and, also, try legging the boat.

The rock of Castle Hill into which the tunnel is dug, oolitic limestone, allows visitors to see trilobite fossils preserved within it. Some fossils which were considered notable and were located close to the waterline, have been removed to prevent them from being eroded and attacked by visitors. Other parts of the tunnel pass through a dolerite known locally as Rowley Rag; and through Coal Measures rocks.

=== Coordinates ===
(With links to map and aerial photo sources)

Point	Coordinates	OS Grid ref.
Northern portal	52.52173°N 2.07840°W	SO947917
Southern portal	52.50110°N 2.10086°W	SO932892

== See also ==
- List of canal tunnels in Great Britain
- Parkhead Viaduct

== Bibliography ==
- Butt, R V J (1995). The Directory of Railway Stations. Patrick Stephens. ISBN 978-1-85260-508-7.
- Clarke, Bob (March 2004). "Canal pioneers - Vic Smallshire". Waterways World. ISSN 0309-1422.
- Cumberlidge, Jane (2009). Inland Waterways of Great Britain (8th Ed.). Imray Laurie Norie and Wilson. ISBN 978-1-84623-010-3.
- Hadfield, Charles (1985). The Canals of the West Midlands. David and Charles. ISBN 978-0-7153-8644-6.
- Nicholson (2006). Nicholson Guides Vol 2: Severn Avon and Birmingham. Harper Collins. ISBN 978-0-00-721110-4.
- Skempton, Sir Alec; et al. (2002). A Biographical Dictionary of Civil Engineers in Great Britain and Ireland: Vol 1: 1500 to 1830. Thomas Telford. ISBN 978-0-7277-2939-2.
- Squires, Roger (2008). Britain's restored canals. Landmark Publishing. ISBN 978-1-84306-331-5.
