= John Sutton IV =

English Baron

Sir John de Sutton IV (6 December 1361 – 10 March 1396) is the 3rd Baron Sutton of Dudley, and heir of Dudley Castle. He was the son of Sir John de Sutton III, 2nd Lord of Dudley, and Katherine de Stafford, youngest daughter of Ralph de Stafford, 1st Earl of Stafford. At the time of his father's death, John IV was a minor whose wardship and marriage was granted to Richard FitzAlan, 11th Earl of Arundel. During the fifth year of Richard II of England, 350 marks was paid to Sir Philip le Spencer, to be a guardian over John IV with the arrangement of marriage to his daughter, Alice. She died in 1392 without issue. John married secondly to an unknown Joan (d. April 1408), by whom Sir John de Sutton V succeeded as heir.
