= Ralph de Somery I =

English noble

Ralph de Somery I was a feudal baron in England. He inherited the barony of Dudley on the death of his uncle, Gervase Paganell, in 1194 although he did not get full ownership of the lands until the death of his mother in 1208. Ralph swapped land that he owned at Wolverhampton with King John, obtaining estates at Kingswinford which proved very valuable to later Lords of Dudley during the Industrial Age. He had three sons and died in 1210.

== Life ==
Ralph de Somery was the son of John de Somery and his wife Hawise, sister and heir of Gervase Paganell, baron of Dudley. When his uncle Gervase died in 1194, Ralph inherited the barony although not all the lands that accompanied the title, as some were inherited by his mother. Around 1205, Ralph swapped land he held at Wolverhampton with King John, obtaining estates at Kingswinford, including Pensnett Chase. The Chase was used by later Lords of Dudley as a hunting ground and much later proved to be a rich source of coal and other minerals.

Ralph married Margaret le Gras, niece of William, Earl of Pembroke. The couple had three sons, Ralph II, William Percival and Roger, who successively inherited the barony. Ralph I died in 1210.
