= William Fitz-Ansculf =

Norman-French landowner

William Fitz-Ansculf was a Norman-French landowner who succeeded his father, Ansculf de Picquigny.

== Birth and early life ==
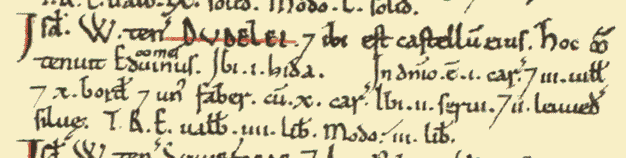
Amongst other possessions, William Fitz-Ansculf was listed as holding the castle and manor of Dudley in the Domesday Book

William's date of birth is not known, though the place was likely in Picquigny, Picardy, now in the Somme department, France, in the mid 11th Century. William inherited many lands in central England that had been granted to his father, Ansculf de Picquigny by William the Conqueror after the Norman conquest in 1066. William made his base at the castle built by his father in Dudley, Worcestershire. He and his successors were overlords of the manors of Selly Oak and Birmingham both of which had previously been owned by Wulfwin. His ownership of Selly Oak was challenged by the Bishop of Lichfield using a nuncupative (oral) will made by Wulfwin as evidence. It would appear that William Fitz-Ansculf died during the First Crusade. Henry of Huntingdon in his ‘History of the English People’ writes that: “Then from the middle of February they besieged the castle of ‘Arqah, for almost three months. Easter was celebrated there (10 April). But Anselm of Ribemont, a very brave knight, died there, struck by a stone, and William of Picardy, and many others.”.

== Lands held ==
The Domesday Book of 1086 shows William holding from the Crown around one-hundred estates in twelve counties. Many of these were estates formerly held by King Harold Godwinsson, Lady Godiva, Earl Algar and Ulwin, a thegn based in the Midlands. William was either Lord, or tenant-in-chief.

Also domesday folio 250:staffordshire describes Walbert holding of William of Bradley [Bradley and Lower Bradley in Bilston] in Offlow hundred

List of land held by William Fitz Ansculf in 1086:

Domesday place name	Modern place name	Owner in 1066
Abinceborne	Abinger, Surrey	King Edward and a huscarl
Belintones	Bellington, Worcestershire	Alric and Holland
Berchelai	Bartley Green, Birmingham	Wulfwin
Bradefelt	Bradfield, Reading	King Edward and Horling
Bradewelle	Bradwell, Milton Keynes	Alric son of Goding, Godwin and Sibbi
Bremingeham	Birmingham	Wulfwin
Caldecote	Caldecote, Buckinghamshire	Four thegns
Catspelle	Chasepool, Staffordshire	
Clive	Clyffe Pypard, Wiltshire	Aelfric, Burghelm, and Godiva
Contone	Compton Beauchamp, Berkshire	King Edward and Almer
Dudelei	Dudley	Earl Edwin
Elesberie	Ellesborough, Buckinghamshire	King Edward and Leofnoth, son of Osmund
Escelie	Selly Oak, Birmingham	Wulfwin
Franchelie	Frankley, Worcestershire	Wulfwin
Hadena	Great Hampden and Little Hampden, Buckinghamshire	Archbishop Stigand and Baldwin, son of Herlewin
Honesworde	Handsworth, Birmingham	Alfrith and Alwin
Hingepene	Inkpen, Berkshire	King Edward
Michelham	Mitcham, Surrey	King Edward, Brictric and two men
Mildetone	Milton, Surrey	King Edward and Wulfric
Moleslei	Moseley, Wolverhampton	Countess Godiva
Morve	Morfe and Little Morfe, Staffordshire	Three free men
Nevport	Newport Pagnell, Buckinghamshire	King Edward and Ulf Fenman
Nordfeld	Northfield, Birmingham	Alwold son of Erngeat
Padendene	Paddington, Surrey	King Edward and a huscarl
Pendeford	Pendeford, Wolverhampton	Ulstan and Godwin
Segleslei	Sedgley, Dudley	Earl Algar
Stoche	Bradenstoke, Wiltshire	Strami
Stoches	Stoke Poges, Buckinghamshire	Earl Harold, Tubbi and Sired
Telingham	Tyringham, Buckinghamshire	Aelfeva, wife of Harold; Estan of Farningham, Godric, Godwin the priest, Harold of Tyringham
Ticheforde	Tickford, Buckinghamshire	Ulf Fenman
Tornelle	Thornhill, Wiltshire	Aelfric, Burghelm and Godiva
Wandesorde	Wandsworth, London	King Edward and six free men
Wamburne	Wombourne, Staffordshire	Thorsten
Wavre	Churchover, Warwickshire	Vagn of Wootton
Willingeuuie	Willingwick, Bromsgrove	Earl Edwin, Alwin, Alwold son of Erngeat, Brictred, Earl Edwin's thane, Erngeat son of Grim, Frani son of Erngeat
Wlsiestone	Little Woolstone, Milton Keynes	King Edward and Edward the noble
