= Ansculf de Picquigny =

11th-century French baron

Ansculf de Picquigny (c. 1014 – c. 1084) was a French baron who followed William the Conqueror to England.

== Biography ==
Ansculf, born around 1014, was the son of Guermond de Picquigny, Picquigny being a village near Amiens in Picardy. Ansculf must have played a significant role in the invasion as he was awarded some 80 manors spread over 11 counties (Berkshire, Buckinghamshire, Hertfordshire, Middlesex, Northamptonshire, Oxfordshire, Rutland, Staffordshire, Surrey, Warwickshire and Worcestershire).

Ansculf was sheriff of Surrey and Buckinghamshire, occurring both counties between 1066 and 1086.

After Earl Edwin's abortive revolt in 1070, Ansculf was granted some of Edwin's lands in the West Midlands, including Dudley. It was there that he built Dudley Castle, a Norman motte-and-bailey, which formed a part of a defensive chain protecting the Midlands from the Welsh, and the caput of his barony of Dudley.

Ansculf before 1086, and was succeeded by his son William Fitz-Ansculf. The Pinckney family is their present-day descendants.
