= John Sutton II =

Sir John de Sutton II (1310 – 21 November 1359) was the first Baron Sutton of Dudley, who was summoned to the Parliament of England in 1342. He was the son of John de Sutton who inherited Dudley Castle by marriage to Margaret, daughter of Roger de Somery. John II married Isabella (d. 10 April 1397), daughter of John Charleton, 1st Baron Cherleton of Powys, before 1329. He was succeeded by his only son Sir John de Sutton III (1338-1370), 2nd Baron Sutton of Dudley. Upon the death of John II, possession of the Castle Dudley was vested to his wife Isabella from 1359 to 1397.
