= John Sutton III =

Sir John de Sutton III (1339 – c. 1370) was the 2nd Baron Sutton of Dudley and heir of Dudley Castle. He was the son of Sir John de Sutton II, the first Lord of Dudley, and Isabella de Cherleton. John III married twice, with the first on 25 December 1357 to Katherine de Stafford (1340/8 – December 1361), daughter of Ralph de Stafford, 1st Earl of Stafford and Margaret de Audley, 2nd Baroness Audley. After 1361, he married secondly to Joan, daughter of Sir John de Clinton of Coleshill.

By Katherine, Sir John de Sutton IV became successor.
