= Parkhead Viaduct =

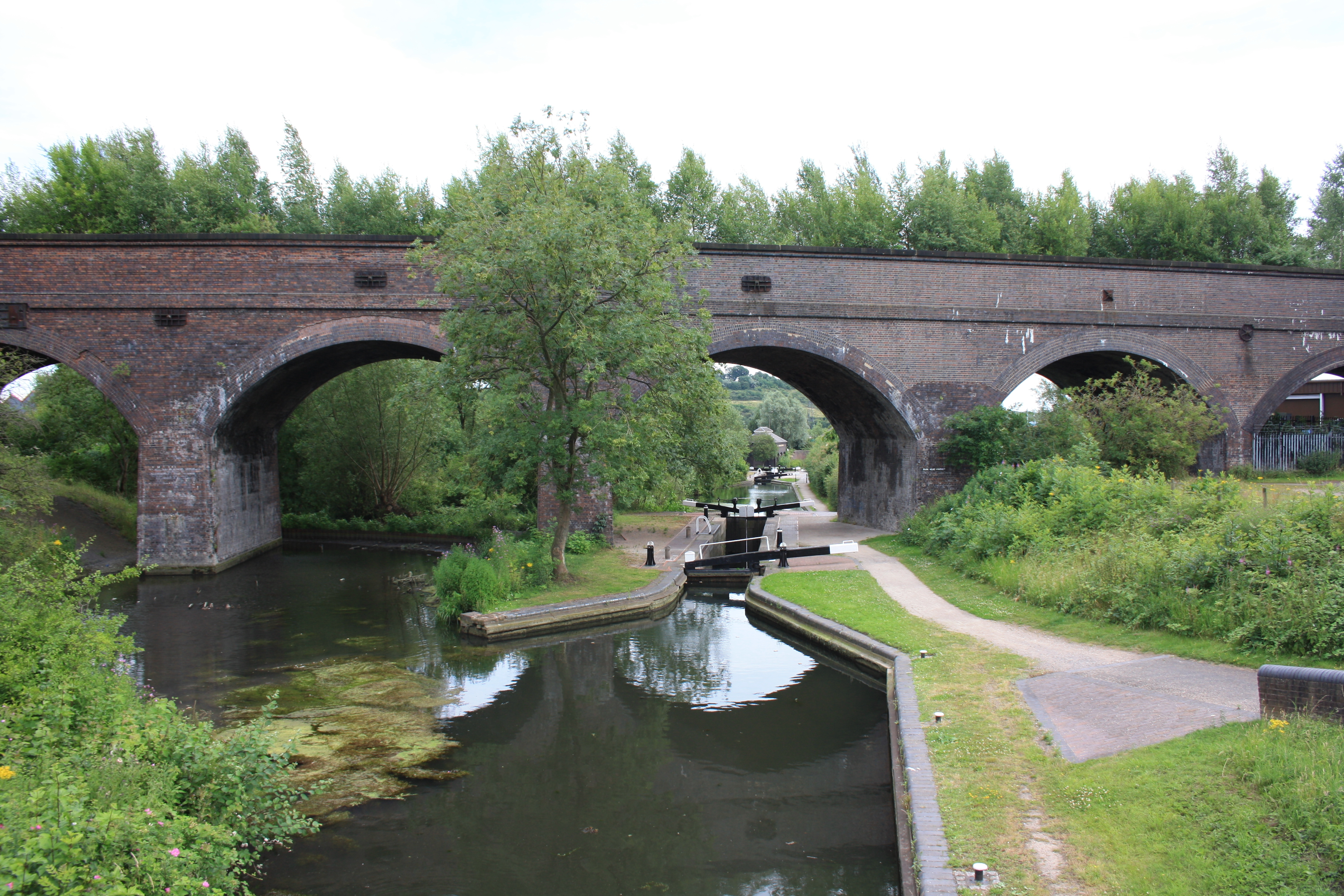
- Coordinates: 52.498711°N 2.099508°W
- Carries: Railway
- Crosses: Dudley Canal
- Locale: Dudley, West Midlands

Characteristics
- Material: Stone

History
- Construction end: 1880

Location
- Interactive map of Parkhead Viaduct

Parkhead Viaduct is a railway viaduct in Dudley, West Midlands, England. The original viaduct was a wooden structure erected in 1850 to carry the Oxford, Worcester and Wolverhampton Railway over Parkhead Locks on the Dudley Canal, near to the southern mouth of the Dudley Tunnel. The current brick viaduct was built in 1880 and it is believed that the original wooden structure is still encased within its successor.

Use of the viaduct had fallen by the late 1960s due to the closure of passenger stations on the route, but the line remained open until 19 March 1993, when the section of the railway between Walsall and Brierley Hill was closed. The most recent train believed to have crossed the viaduct was a cable laying train on 1 July 1993, nearly four months after the line's closure.

The section of track over Parkhead Viaduct was removed in about 1995, with most of the track between Highgate Road and Blowers Green Road following in 1998 due to the construction of a new road bridge over the line nearby. The structure of the viaduct remained intact after the railway’s closure but fell into disrepair and required major strengthening and refurbishment to carry the Wednesbury to Brierley Hill extension of the West Midlands Metro tram network. The viaduct forms part of the second phase of this route, which is expected to open in 2028.
