= List of United Kingdom locations: Ra-Ray =

The United Kingdom

This is part of the list of United Kingdom locations: a gazetteer of place names in the United Kingdom showing each place's locality and geographical coordinates.

== Ra ==
=== Rab ===
Location	Locality	Coordinates (links to map & photo sources)	OS grid reference
Rabbit Islands	Highland	58.53°N 04.40°W	NC602631
Rabbit's Cross	Kent	51.19°N 00.54°E	TQ7847
Rableyheath	Hertfordshire	51.85°N 00.21°W	TL2319
Raby	Cumbria	54.84°N 03.27°W	NY1851
Raby	Wirral	53.30°N 03.03°W	SJ3179

=== Rac ===
Location	Locality	Coordinates (links to map & photo sources)	OS grid reference
Racecourse	Suffolk	52.03°N 01.17°E	TM1842
Racedown	Hampshire	51.19°N 01.62°W	SU2644
Rachan Mill	Scottish Borders	55.59°N 03.41°W	NT1134
Rachub	Gwynedd	53.19°N 04.06°W	SH6268
Rack End	Oxfordshire	51.72°N 01.42°W	SP4003
Rackenford	Devon	50.95°N 03.63°W	SS8518
Rackham	West Sussex	50.90°N 00.52°W	TQ0413
Rackheath	Norfolk	52.66°N 01.37°E	TG2813
Rackley	Somerset	51.28°N 02.87°W	ST3954
Racks	Dumfries and Galloway	55.05°N 03.52°W	NY0374
Rackwick (Westray)	Orkney Islands	59.32°N 02.98°W	HY4449
Rackwick (Hoy)	Orkney Islands	58.87°N 03.38°W	ND2099

=== Rad ===
Location	Locality	Coordinates (links to map & photo sources)	OS grid reference
Radbourne	Derbyshire	52.92°N 01.58°W	SK2836
Radcliffe	Bury	53.55°N 02.33°W	SD7807
Radcliffe	Northumberland	55.31°N 01.59°W	NU2602
Radcliffe on Trent	Nottinghamshire	52.94°N 01.04°W	SK6439
Radclive	Buckinghamshire	51.99°N 01.02°W	SP6733
Radcot	Oxfordshire	51.68°N 01.59°W	SU2899
Raddery	Highland	57.60°N 04.16°W	NH7159
Raddington	Somerset	51.01°N 03.39°W	ST0225
Raddon	Devon	50.79°N 03.54°W	SS9101
Radernie	Fife	56.27°N 02.85°W	NO4709
Radfall	Kent	51.33°N 01.05°E	TR1364
Radfield	Kent	51.32°N 00.78°E	TQ9462
Radford	Bath and North East Somerset	51.31°N 02.47°W	ST6757
Radford	Coventry	52.41°N 01.53°W	SP3280
Radford	Nottinghamshire	52.95°N 01.18°W	SK5540
Radford	Oxfordshire	51.90°N 01.41°W	SP4023
Radford	Worcestershire	52.19°N 02.00°W	SP0055
Radfordbridge	Oxfordshire	51.90°N 01.41°W	SP4023
Radford Semele	Warwickshire	52.27°N 01.50°W	SP3464
Radipole	Dorset	50.62°N 02.48°W	SY6681
Radlet	Somerset	51.13°N 03.14°W	ST2038
Radlett	Hertfordshire	51.67°N 00.32°W	TQ1699
Radley	Oxfordshire	51.67°N 01.24°W	SU5298
Radley Green	Essex	51.72°N 00.34°E	TL6205
Radley Park	Oxfordshire	51.68°N 01.26°W	SU5199
Radlith	Shropshire	52.63°N 02.87°W	SJ4105
Radmanthwaite	Nottinghamshire	53.16°N 01.23°W	SK5163
Radmoor	Shropshire	52.81°N 02.56°W	SJ6224
Radmore Green	Cheshire	53.09°N 02.61°W	SJ5955
Radmore Wood	Staffordshire	52.82°N 01.86°W	SK0925
Radnage	Buckinghamshire	51.66°N 00.87°W	SU7897
Radnor	Cornwall	50.25°N 05.22°W	SW7044
Radnor Park	West Dunbartonshire	55.90°N 04.41°W	NS4971
Radstock	Bath and North East Somerset	51.28°N 02.46°W	ST6854
Radstone	Northamptonshire	52.05°N 01.15°W	SP5840
Radway	Warwickshire	52.12°N 01.46°W	SP3748
Radway Green	Cheshire	53.08°N 02.34°W	SJ7754
Radwell	Bedfordshire	52.20°N 00.53°W	TL0057
Radwell	Hertfordshire	52.00°N 00.22°W	TL2235
Radwinter	Essex	52.00°N 00.33°E	TL6037
Radwinter End	Essex	52.02°N 00.34°E	TL6139
Radyr	Cardiff	51.51°N 03.26°W	ST1280

=== Rae ===
Location	Locality	Coordinates (links to map & photo sources)	OS grid reference
Raehills	Dumfries and Galloway	55.23°N 03.47°W	NY0694

=== Raf ===
Location	Locality	Coordinates (links to map & photo sources)	OS grid reference
Rafborough	Hampshire	51.28°N 00.78°W	SU8555
Rafford	Moray	57.58°N 03.57°W	NJ0656

=== Rag ===
Location	Locality	Coordinates (links to map & photo sources)	OS grid reference
Raga	Shetland Islands	60.60°N 01.14°W	HU4792
Ragdale	Leicestershire	52.76°N 01.02°W	SK6619
Ragdon	Shropshire	52.51°N 02.81°W	SO4591
Raggalds	Calderdale	53.77°N 01.88°W	SE0831
Ragged Appleshaw	Hampshire	51.23°N 01.55°W	SU3148
Raggra	Highland	58.37°N 03.18°W	ND3144
Raginnis	Cornwall	50.07°N 05.55°W	SW4625
Raglan	Monmouthshire	51.75°N 02.85°W	SO4107
Ragmere	Norfolk	52.46°N 01.03°E	TM0690
Ragnal	Ragnal	51.45°N 01.55°W	SU3173
Ragnall	Nottinghamshire	53.24°N 00.80°W	SK8073

=== Rah ===
Location	Locality	Coordinates (links to map & photo sources)	OS grid reference
Rahane	Argyll and Bute	56.04°N 04.84°W	NS2387

=== Rai ===
Location	Locality	Coordinates (links to map & photo sources)	OS grid reference
Railsbrough	Shetland Islands	60.25°N 01.17°W	HU4652
Rainbow Hill	Worcestershire	52.20°N 02.22°W	SO8556
Rainford	St Helens	53.50°N 02.80°W	SD4701
Rainford Junction	St Helens	53.51°N 02.80°W	SD4702
Rainham	Havering	51.51°N 00.18°E	TQ5282
Rainham	Kent	51.35°N 00.59°E	TQ8165
Rainhill	St Helens	53.41°N 02.76°W	SJ4991
Rainhill Stoops	St Helens	53.40°N 02.75°W	SJ5090
Rainow	Cheshire	53.28°N 02.07°W	SJ9576
Rainowlow	Cheshire	53.29°N 02.07°W	SJ9577
Rain Shore	Rochdale	53.63°N 02.22°W	SD8515
Rainsough	Bury	53.51°N 02.28°W	SD8102
Rainton	North Yorkshire	54.16°N 01.43°W	SE3775
Rainton Bridge	Sunderland	54.82°N 01.47°W	NZ3448
Rainton Gate	Durham	54.80°N 01.50°W	NZ3246
Rainworth	Nottinghamshire	53.11°N 01.11°W	SK5958
Raisbeck	Cumbria	54.45°N 02.55°W	NY6407
Raise	Cumbria	54.80°N 02.45°W	NY7146
Rait	Perth and Kinross	56.42°N 03.26°W	NO2226
Raithby (Raithby cum Maltby)	Lincolnshire	53.33°N 00.03°W	TF3184
Raithby by Spilsby	Lincolnshire	53.18°N 00.04°E	TF3767

=== Rak ===
Location	Locality	Coordinates (links to map & photo sources)	OS grid reference
Rake	West Sussex	51.03°N 00.86°W	SU8027
Rake Common	Hampshire	51.02°N 00.88°W	SU7826
Rake End	Staffordshire	52.75°N 01.89°W	SK0718
Rake Head	Lancashire	53.68°N 02.24°W	SD8421
Rakes Dale	Staffordshire	52.97°N 01.91°W	SK0642
Rakeway	Staffordshire	52.97°N 01.97°W	SK0242
Rakewood	Rochdale	53.62°N 02.09°W	SD9414
Raleigh	Devon	51.08°N 04.05°W	SS5634

=== Ral ===
Location	Locality	Coordinates (links to map & photo sources)	OS grid reference
Rallt	Swansea	51.61°N 04.13°W	SS5293

=== Ram ===
Location	Locality	Coordinates (links to map & photo sources)	OS grid reference
Ram	Carmarthenshire	52.09°N 04.07°W	SN5846
Ramah	Shetland Islands	60.47°N 01.36°W	HU3577
Ram Alley	Wiltshire	51.36°N 01.68°W	SU2263
Ramasaig	Highland	57.39°N 06.72°W	NG1644
Rame (Maker-with-Rame)	Cornwall	50.31°N 04.22°W	SX4249
Rame (Wendron)	Cornwall	50.16°N 05.19°W	SW7234
Rame Head	Cornwall	50.31°N 04.22°W	SX417485
Ram Hill	South Gloucestershire	51.50°N 02.47°W	ST6779
Ram Lane	Kent	51.17°N 00.80°E	TQ9646
Ramnageo	Shetland Islands	60.67°N 00.86°W	HP6200
Ramornie	Fife	56.26°N 03.09°W	NO3209
Rampisham	Dorset	50.81°N 02.62°W	ST5602
Rampside	Cumbria	54.08°N 03.16°W	SD2466
Rampton	Cambridgeshire	52.28°N 00.08°E	TL4267
Rampton	Nottinghamshire	53.29°N 00.81°W	SK7978
Ramsbottom	Bury	53.64°N 02.33°W	SD7816
Ramsburn	Moray	57.55°N 02.73°W	NJ5652
Ramsbury	Wiltshire	51.43°N 01.61°W	SU2771
Ramscraigs	Highland	58.21°N 03.48°W	ND1326
Ramsdean	Hampshire	50.99°N 01.00°W	SU7022
Ramsdell	Hampshire	51.30°N 01.16°W	SU5857
Ramsden	Worcestershire	52.11°N 02.11°W	SO9246
Ramsden	Oxfordshire	51.83°N 01.49°W	SP3515
Ramsden	Bromley	51.37°N 00.11°E	TQ4766
Ramsden Bellhouse	Essex	51.61°N 00.46°E	TQ7194
Ramsden Heath	Essex	51.62°N 00.46°E	TQ7195
Ramsden Wood	Calderdale	53.68°N 02.12°W	SD9221
Ramsey	Cambridgeshire	52.44°N 00.11°W	TL2885
Ramsey	Essex	51.92°N 01.21°E	TM2130
Ramsey	Isle of Man	54.31°N 04.38°W	SC4594
Ramsey Forty Foot	Cambridgeshire	52.46°N 00.08°W	TL3087
Ramsey Island	Pembrokeshire	51.87°N 05.33°W	SM702243
Ramsey Island	Essex	51.71°N 00.82°E	TL9505
Ramsey Mereside	Cambridgeshire	52.48°N 00.11°W	TL2889
Ramsey St Mary's	Cambridgeshire	52.47°N 00.16°W	TL2588
Ramsgate	Kent	51.32°N 01.41°E	TR3864
Ramsgill	North Yorkshire	54.13°N 01.83°W	SE1171
Ramshaw (Bishop Auckland)	Durham	54.62°N 01.78°W	NZ1426
Ramshaw (Consett)	Durham	54.81°N 02.07°W	NY9547
Ramsholt	Suffolk	52.01°N 01.36°E	TM3141
Ramshorn	Staffordshire	53.00°N 01.88°W	SK0845
Ramsley	Devon	50.72°N 03.92°W	SX6493
Ramslye	East Sussex	51.12°N 00.22°E	TQ5638
Rams Ness	Shetland Islands	60.56°N 00.88°W	HU610873
Ramsnest Common	Surrey	51.08°N 00.65°W	SU9433

=== Ran ===
Location	Locality	Coordinates (links to map & photo sources)	OS grid reference
Ranais	Western Isles	58.12°N 06.41°W	NB4024
Ranby	Lincolnshire	53.28°N 00.17°W	TF2278
Ranby	Nottinghamshire	53.31°N 01.02°W	SK6580
Rand	Lincolnshire	53.28°N 00.35°W	TF1078
Randlay	Shropshire	52.66°N 02.44°W	SJ7007
Randwick	Gloucestershire	51.75°N 02.26°W	SO8206
Ranfurly	Renfrewshire	55.85°N 04.57°W	NS3965
Rangemore	Staffordshire	52.80°N 01.73°W	SK1823
Rangeworthy	South Gloucestershire	51.57°N 02.46°W	ST6886
Rankinston	East Ayrshire	55.39°N 04.44°W	NS4514
Rank's Green	Essex	51.83°N 00.53°E	TL7518
Ranmoor	Sheffield	53.37°N 01.53°W	SK3186
Ranmore Common	Surrey	51.23°N 00.36°W	TQ1450
Ranochan	Highland	56.87°N 05.57°W	NM8282
Ranskill	Nottinghamshire	53.37°N 01.02°W	SK6587
Ranton	Staffordshire	52.81°N 02.22°W	SJ8524
Ranton Green	Staffordshire	52.79°N 02.23°W	SJ8422
Ranworth	Norfolk	52.67°N 01.47°E	TG3514

=== Rao ===
Location	Locality	Coordinates (links to map & photo sources)	OS grid reference
Raon na Crèadha	Western Isles	58.21°N 06.36°W	NB4433

=== Rap ===
Location	Locality	Coordinates (links to map & photo sources)	OS grid reference
Rapkyns	West Sussex	51.06°N 00.38°W	TQ1331
Raploch	Stirling	56.12°N 03.96°W	NS7894
Rapness	Orkney Islands	59.25°N 02.86°W	HY5141
Rapps	Somerset	50.94°N 02.95°W	ST3317

=== Ras ===
Location	Locality	Coordinates (links to map & photo sources)	OS grid reference
Rascal Moor	East Riding of Yorkshire	53.81°N 00.75°W	SE8236
Rashielee	Renfrewshire	55.89°N 04.46°W	NS4670
Rashwood	Worcestershire	52.28°N 02.13°W	SO9165
Raskelf	North Yorkshire	54.13°N 01.25°W	SE4971
Rassau	Blaenau Gwent	51.80°N 03.23°W	SO1512
Rastrick	Calderdale	53.68°N 01.80°W	SE1321

=== Rat ===
Location	Locality	Coordinates (links to map & photo sources)	OS grid reference
Ratagan	Highland	57.21°N 05.46°W	NG9119
Ratby	Leicestershire	52.64°N 01.24°W	SK5105
Ratcliff	Tower Hamlets	51.50°N 00.05°W	TQ3580
Ratcliffe Culey	Leicestershire	52.58°N 01.52°W	SP3299
Ratcliffe on Soar	Nottinghamshire	52.85°N 01.27°W	SK4929
Ratcliffe on the Wreake	Leicestershire	52.72°N 01.06°W	SK6314
Ratford	Wiltshire	51.44°N 02.03°W	ST9872
Ratfyn	Wiltshire	51.17°N 01.77°W	SU1642
Rathen	Aberdeenshire	57.63°N 02.00°W	NK0060
Rathillet	Fife	56.36°N 03.03°W	NO3620
Rathmell	North Yorkshire	54.02°N 02.30°W	SD8059
Ratho	City of Edinburgh	55.91°N 03.39°W	NT1370
Ratho Station	City of Edinburgh	55.93°N 03.39°W	NT1372
Rathven	Moray	57.67°N 02.94°W	NJ4465
Ratlake	Hampshire	51.00°N 01.41°W	SU4123
Ratley	Warwickshire	52.12°N 01.44°W	SP3847
Ratling	Kent	51.23°N 01.20°E	TR2453
Ratlinghope	Shropshire	52.55°N 02.88°W	SO4096
Ratsloe	Devon	50.76°N 03.49°W	SX9597
Ratten Row (Caldbeck)	Cumbria	54.75°N 03.05°W	NY3240
Ratten Row (St Cuthbert Without)	Cumbria	54.83°N 02.95°W	NY3949
Ratten Row	Lancashire	53.86°N 02.88°W	SD4241
Ratten Row	Norfolk	52.69°N 00.23°E	TF5113
Rattery	Devon	50.43°N 03.77°W	SX7461
Rattlesden	Suffolk	52.19°N 00.88°E	TL9759
Rattray	Perth and Kinross	56.59°N 03.33°W	NO1845
Rattray Head	Aberdeenshire	57.60°N 01.83°W	NK101577

=== Rau ===
Location	Locality	Coordinates (links to map & photo sources)	OS grid reference
Raughton	Cumbria	54.81°N 02.95°W	NY3947
Raughton Head	Cumbria	54.79°N 02.98°W	NY3745
Raunds	Northamptonshire	52.33°N 00.54°W	SP9972

=== Rav ===
Location	Locality	Coordinates (links to map & photo sources)	OS grid reference="
Ravelston	City of Edinburgh	55.95°N 03.25°W	NT2274
Ravenfield	Rotherham	53.44°N 01.27°W	SK4895
Ravenglass	Cumbria	54.35°N 03.41°W	SD0896
Ravenhead	St Helens	53.44°N 02.75°W	SJ5094
Ravenhills Green	Herefordshire	52.18°N 02.38°W	SO7454
Raveningham	Norfolk	52.50°N 01.52°E	TM3996
Ravenscar	North Yorkshire	54.39°N 00.49°W	NZ9801
Ravenscliffe	Bradford	53.81°N 01.71°W	SE1935
Ravenscliffe	Staffordshire	53.06°N 02.24°W	SJ8452
Ravenscraig	Inverclyde	55.93°N 04.80°W	NS2575
Ravensden	Bedfordshire	52.17°N 00.43°W	TL0754
Ravenseat	North Yorkshire	54.42°N 02.21°W	NY8603
Raven's Green	Essex	51.87°N 01.04°E	TM1024
Ravenshall	Staffordshire	53.02°N 02.37°W	SJ7547
Ravenshead	Nottinghamshire	53.08°N 01.18°W	SK5554
Ravensmoor	Cheshire	53.04°N 02.56°W	SJ6250
Ravensthorpe	Northamptonshire	52.32°N 01.03°W	SP6670
Ravensthorpe	Kirklees	53.67°N 01.66°W	SE2220
Ravensthorpe	Cambridgeshire	52.58°N 00.28°W	TF1600
Ravenstone	Milton Keynes	52.14°N 00.77°W	SP8450
Ravenstone	Leicestershire	52.71°N 01.40°W	SK4013
Ravenstonedale	Cumbria	54.42°N 02.43°W	NY7203
Ravenstown	Cumbria	54.16°N 02.98°W	SD3675
Ravenswood Village Settlement	Berkshire	51.36°N 00.82°W	SU8264
Ravensworth	North Yorkshire	54.45°N 01.78°W	NZ1407

=== Raw ===
Location	Locality	Coordinates (links to map & photo sources)	OS grid reference
Raw	North Yorkshire	54.43°N 00.56°W	NZ9305
Rawcliffe	East Riding of Yorkshire	53.69°N 00.97°W	SE6822
Rawcliffe	York	53.98°N 01.11°W	SE5855
Rawcliffe Bridge	East Riding of Yorkshire	53.68°N 00.94°W	SE7021
Rawdon	Leeds	53.84°N 01.68°W	SE2139
Rawdon Carrs	Leeds	53.83°N 01.68°W	SE2138
Rawfolds	Kirklees	53.71°N 01.71°W	SE1924
Rawgreen	Northumberland	54.89°N 02.12°W	NY9256
Raw Green	Barnsley	53.55°N 01.59°W	SE2707
Rawmarsh	Rotherham	53.45°N 01.35°W	SK4396
Rawnsley	Staffordshire	52.70°N 01.97°W	SK0212
Rawreth	Essex	51.60°N 00.56°E	TQ7893
Rawreth Shot	Essex	51.60°N 00.55°E	TQ7793
Rawridge	Devon	50.84°N 03.13°W	ST2006
Rawson Green	Derbyshire	53.01°N 01.44°W	SK3746
Rawtenstall	Lancashire	53.71°N 02.28°W	SD8124
Rawthorpe	Kirklees	53.64°N 01.75°W	SE1617
Rawyards	North Lanarkshire	55.87°N 03.96°W	NS7766

=== Ray ===
Location	Locality	Coordinates (links to map & photo sources)	OS grid reference
Raydon	Suffolk	52.00°N 00.98°E	TM0538
Raygill	North Yorkshire	53.90°N 02.09°W	SD9445
Raylees	Northumberland	55.21°N 02.12°W	NY9291
Rayleigh	Essex	51.58°N 00.61°E	TQ8190
Raymond's Hill	Devon	50.75°N 02.96°W	SY3296
Rayne	Essex	51.87°N 00.49°E	TL7222
Rayners Lane	Harrow	51.57°N 00.38°W	TQ1287
Raynes Park	Merton	51.39°N 00.23°W	TQ2368
Raywell	East Riding of Yorkshire	53.77°N 00.49°W	SE9930
