= Listed buildings in Ellenhall =

Civil parish in Staffordshire, England

Ellenhall is a civil parish in the Borough of Stafford, Staffordshire, England. It contains five listed buildings that are recorded in the National Heritage List for England. Of these, two are at Grade II*, the middle of the three grades, and the others are at Grade II, the lowest grade. The parish contains the villages of Ellenhall and Ranton and the surrounding countryside. The listed buildings consist of a church, a cross in the churchyard, the surviving tower of an abbey church, a house, and a milepost.

== Key ==
Grade	Criteria
II*	Particularly important buildings of more than special interest
II	Buildings of national importance and special interest

== Buildings ==
Name and location	Photograph	Date	Notes	Grade
St Mary's Church; 52.83604°N 2.23721°W		12th century	The chancel was largely rebuilt in 1683, the nave was rebuilt and the tower added in 1757, and the church was restored in 1885–88 by Charles Lynam when the porch was added. The tower and south wall of the nave are in brick, and the rest of the church is in stone, and the roof is tiled. The church consists of a nave, a southwest porch, a chancel, a northeast vestry, and a west tower. The tower has three stages, moulded string courses, clock faces, and an embattled parapet. In the chancel is a Norman north window, and the other windows are Perpendicular.	II*
Churchyard cross 52.83597°N 2.23727°W	—	Medieval	The cross is in the churchyard of St Mary's Church. It is in stone, and has a square chamfered base on three steps. On the base is a tapering shaft, the upper part of which is modern. On the top is a crucifix dating from the 19th century. The cross is a scheduled monument.	II
Tower, Ranton Abbey; 52.81580°N 2.24152°W		15th century	The tower is the only remaining part of the church of the abbey. It is in stone, and has angle buttresses, a west doorway and a five-light west window, both with decorated hood moulds, a high arch to the former nave with embattled capitals, two-light bell openings, and a saltire frieze under an embattled parapet. A portion of the nave wall also survives, and this contains a Norman doorway with a continuous roll-moulding. The site on which the tower stands is a scheduled monument.	II*
Ellenhall Hall; 52.83626°N 2.23797°W		17th century	The house, which was altered later, is in brick with corner buttresses and a tile roof. There are two storeys and an attic, a front with three bays, two gables, and a gabled porch. The windows are casements with cambered heads, and there is a blind circular window in each gable. The left return has three bays, and contains two canted bay windows.	II
Milepost; 52.82047°N 2.25015°W		Mid 19th century	The milepost is on the north side of the Stafford to Newport road (B5405 road). It is in cast iron and has a triangular plan and a sloping top. The milepost is inscribed "Parish of Seighford" and the distances to London, Stafford and Newport.	II
