= List of listed buildings in Edinburgh/16 =

This is a list of listed buildings in Edinburgh, Scotland.

== List ==
| Name | Location | Date listed | Grid ref. (Note: Sometimes known as OSGB36, the grid reference (where provided) is based on the British national grid reference system used by the Ordnance Survey. • "Guide to National Grid". Ordnance Survey. • "Get-a-map". Ordnance Survey.) | Geo-coordinates | Notes | LB number (Note: Historic Environment Scotland assign a unique alphanumeric identifier to each designated site in Scotland, for listed buildings this always begins with "LB", for example "LB12345".) | Image |
|---|---|---|---|---|---|---|---|
| 26 Bellfield Street | | | | 55°57′10″N 3°06′29″W | Category C(S) | 27026 | Upload Photo |
| 46 Ferry Road With Front Wall And Railings And Shelter; Eh6 4Ae | | | | 55°58′31″N 3°10′52″W | Category B | 27030 | Upload Photo |
| 64-70 (Even Nos) And 70A Ferry Road With Front Walls And Railings; Eh6 4Ah | | | | 55°58′30″N 3°10′55″W | Category C(S) | 27040 | Upload Photo |
| 7 Ettrick Road | | | | 55°56′00″N 3°13′12″W | Category C(S) | 27043 | Upload Photo |
| 7, 8 And 9 Seacot, Seacote House | | | | 55°58′05″N 3°08′59″W | Category B | 27054 | Upload Photo |
| 22, 24 Burgess Street, And 65 Shore | | | | 55°58′31″N 3°10′14″W | Category C(S) | 27057 | Upload Photo |
| 1 Dean Bridge, Holy Trinity Church (Formerly Scottish Episcopal Church) | | | | 55°57′13″N 3°12′56″W | Category B | 27059 | Upload another image |
| Leith Docks, Paint Shed At Shipbuilding Yard | | | | 55°58′49″N 3°10′33″W | Category B | 27071 | Upload another image |
| 4 Ettrick Road | | | | 55°56′00″N 3°13′14″W | Category C(S) | 27074 | Upload Photo |
| 10 And 12 Brighton Place | | | | 55°57′09″N 3°06′55″W | Category B | 27077 | Upload Photo |
| Dalmahoy Estate, Dalmahoy Bridge Gogar Burn | | | | 55°54′26″N 3°22′02″W | Category A | 26940 | Upload Photo |
| 18-22(Even Nos) Gray's Loan, Former Rudolf Steiner School | | | | 55°55′48″N 3°13′29″W | Category B | 26954 | Upload another image |
| 30-36 Bernard Street | | | | 55°58′34″N 3°10′06″W | Category B | 26959 | Upload Photo |
| 13A And 13B Chamberlain Road | | | | 55°56′04″N 3°12′33″W | Category C(S) | 26972 | Upload Photo |
| Orwell Terrace, St Brides Community Centre (Former Parish Church And Hall) | | | | 55°56′34″N 3°13′14″W | Category B | 26974 | Upload Photo |
| Dalmahoy Estate, St Mary's Episcopal Church | | | | 55°54′26″N 3°22′07″W | Category B | 26987 | Upload Photo |
| 64 And 66 Colinton Road With Gates And Railings | | | | 55°55′36″N 3°13′59″W | Category B | 26989 | Upload Photo |
| 11 Ladycroft, St Mungo's Episcopalian Church With Cottage And Boundary Wall And Gatepiers | | | | 55°53′04″N 3°20′18″W | Category B | 26991 | Upload Photo |
| Gorgie Road, (At Tynecastle Lane), Railway Bridge | | | | 55°56′19″N 3°13′46″W | Category B | 26997 | Upload another image |
| 6 John Street | | | | 55°57′07″N 3°06′17″W | Category B | 27000 | Upload Photo |
| 50-58 (Even Nos) Bernard Street And 35 Shore | | | | 55°58′35″N 3°10′09″W | Category B | 27005 | Upload another image |
| Dalmahoy Home Farm And Stables | | | | 55°54′21″N 3°21′55″W | Category C(S) | 27010 | Upload Photo |
| 1 Joppa Pans, (Rock Cottage) | | | | 55°56′55″N 3°05′18″W | Category B | 27011 | Upload Photo |
| 527, Lanark Road West, Ravelrig Estate, Dovecot | | | | 55°53′09″N 3°20′39″W | Category A | 27014 | Upload Photo |
| 46-56 (Even Nos) Bath Street (Brighton Mansions) | | | | 55°57′17″N 3°06′40″W | Category B | 26896 | Upload Photo |
| Haymarket Terrace, Haymarket Station Entrance And Office Block With Steps, Railings, And Lamp Standard | | | | 55°56′44″N 3°13′06″W | Category A | 26901 | Upload another image See more images |
| 26 Colinton Road | | | | 55°55′53″N 3°13′11″W | Category C(S) | 26917 | Upload Photo |
| 15-23 (Odd Nos) Bernard Street And 26 Maritime Street | | | | 55°58′32″N 3°10′03″W | Category B | 26796 | Upload Photo |
| 13 Braid Road, Braidfoot | | | | 55°55′25″N 3°12′33″W | Category C(S) | 26797 | Upload Photo |
| Dalry Road, St Martin Of Tours (Episcopal) With Boundary Walls | | | | 55°56′25″N 3°13′31″W | Category B | 26799 | Upload another image |
| 97 Slateford Road And 11 To 15 Hermand Street, St Stephen's Works Waddie & Co Ltd | | | | 55°56′00″N 3°14′03″W | Category C(S) | 26808 | Upload Photo |
| 1-12 (Inclusive Nos) Commercial Street And 26-43 (Inclusive Nos) Sandport Street (And Commercial Wharf); Eh6 6Ja And Eh6 6Ep Respectively | | | | 55°58′35″N 3°10′19″W | Category B | 26812 | Upload Photo |
| 69B Braid Road Hermitage Of Braid Lodge | | | | 55°55′10″N 3°12′36″W | Category C(S) | 26822 | Upload another image |
| Canongate Parish Church Including Burial Ground, Gates, Gatepiers, Boundary Walls And Railings | | | | 55°57′06″N 3°10′46″W | Category A | 26823 | Upload another image |
| 3 Gladstone Place With Boundary Wall | | | | 55°58′11″N 3°09′34″W | Category C(S) | 26829 | Upload Photo |
| 185-193 (Odd Nos) Leith Walk | | | | 55°58′02″N 3°10′28″W | Category B | 26832 | Upload Photo |
| 258-266 (Even Nos) Gorgie Road And Link To Smithfield Street | | | | 55°56′14″N 3°14′08″W | Category C(S) | 26851 | Upload Photo |
| 31 Bellfield Street | | | | 55°57′08″N 3°06′27″W | Category A | 26749 | Upload Photo |
| 176-196 Even Nos Bruntsfield Place | | | | 55°56′10″N 3°12′35″W | Category C(S) | 26750 | Upload Photo |
| 22 Braid Avenue And 9A Hermitage Drive With Carriage House, Boundary Walls And Gatepiers | | | | 55°55′17″N 3°12′18″W | Category B | 26757 | Upload Photo |
| Ashley House With Orangery | | | | 55°55′40″N 3°21′28″W | Category B | 26761 | Upload Photo |
| 8 And 9 Claremont Park With Boundary Wall, Gatepiers And Lamp Brackets | | | | 55°58′11″N 3°09′18″W | Category B | 26764 | Upload Photo |
| Bernard Street, Robert Burns Statue | | | | 55°58′31″N 3°10′00″W | Category B | 26769 | Upload Photo |
| 33 And 35 Broughton Place, Formerly Broughton Place Church And Offices | | | | 55°57′33″N 3°11′14″W | Category A | 26771 | Upload another image See more images |
| Ashley House Lodge With Boundary Walls And Gatepiers | | | | 55°55′51″N 3°21′33″W | Category C(S) | 26775 | Upload Photo |
| 212-226 Even Nos Bruntsfield Place | | | | 55°56′07″N 3°12′38″W | Category B | 26790 | Upload Photo |
| 2 And 3 Claremont Park With Boundary Walls, Gatepiers And Lamp Brackets | | | | 55°58′11″N 3°09′28″W | Category B | 26700 | Upload Photo |
| 14 And 16 Abbotsford Park With Boundary Wall | | | | 55°55′54″N 3°12′41″W | Category B | 26719 | Upload Photo |
| 5 And 7 Bath Street | | | | 55°57′11″N 3°06′49″W | Category C(S) | 26728 | Upload Photo |
| Dalry Road, Dalry Cemetery, Gatepiers, Boundary Walls And Railings | | | | 55°56′24″N 3°13′27″W | Category C(S) | 26733 | Upload Photo |
| 11 Drum Terrace, Eastern Cemetery, The Lodge, Gates, Railings And Gate Piers | | | | 55°57′45″N 3°10′12″W | Category B | 26742 | Upload Photo |
| Gorgie Road And Ardmillan Terrace Springwell House With Gatepiers Boundary Walls And Railings | | | | 55°56′20″N 3°13′38″W | Category C(S) | 26743 | Upload Photo |
| Dalmeny Village, Main Street, Gospatric House, Including Terrace Walls, Garden Walls And Gatepiers | | | | 55°58′59″N 3°22′24″W | Category C(S) | 5526 | Upload Photo |
| Dalmeny Village, 3 Wester Dalmeny | | | | 55°58′57″N 3°22′26″W | Category C(S) | 5531 | Upload Photo |
| Dalmeny Village, 12 And 13 Main Street | | | | 55°58′54″N 3°22′28″W | Category C(S) | 5541 | Upload Photo |
| Dalmeny House, Barnbougle Castle, Including Balustrade And Sundial | | | | 55°59′31″N 3°20′06″W | Category A | 5548 | Upload another image |
| Braehead Mains, Statuary Group | | | | 55°57′47″N 3°18′57″W | Category B | 5553 | Upload Photo |
| West Craigie Farmhouse, Including Gatepiers And Boundary Walls | | | | 55°58′25″N 3°21′08″W | Category B | 5565 | Upload Photo |
| 7 Cramond Bridge, Cramond Bridge, Old Farmhouse | | | | 55°57′52″N 3°19′05″W | Category C(S) | 5566 | Upload Photo |
| Dalmeny House, Barnbougle Gate Lodge, Including Gatepiers, Boundary Wall And Kennels | | | | 55°58′50″N 3°20′53″W | Category B | 5501 | Upload Photo |
| Dalmeny House, East Craigie Gate Lodge, Including Boundary Wall And Gatepiers | | | | 55°57′59″N 3°19′08″W | Category C(S) | 5504 | Upload Photo |
| Dalmeny House, 1, 2, 3, 4 Long Green | | | | 55°59′00″N 3°19′13″W | Category B | 5508 | Upload Photo |
| Dalmeny House, Newhalls Gate Lodge | | | | 55°59′20″N 3°22′29″W | Category C(S) | 5510 | Upload Photo |
| Dalmeny Station, Including Booking Office, Waiting Rooms, Canopy, Platforms And Fencing | | | | 55°59′10″N 3°22′54″W | Category B | 5511 | Upload Photo |
| Dundas Castle, Including Stable Block | | | | 55°58′31″N 3°24′52″W | Category A | 5512 | Upload another image |
| 372-376 (Even Nos) Leith Walk (Formerly 1-3 George Place), Including Boundary Walls | | | | 55°57′48″N 3°10′44″W | Category B | 45803 | Upload Photo |
| 55 Buckstone Terrace, Fairmilehead Water Treatment Works, Filter House, Hillend Pump House And Entrance Gates And Boundary Wall | | | | 55°54′14″N 3°12′19″W | Category B | 45834 | Upload Photo |
| 57 Oxgangs Road, Including Garage | | | | 55°54′07″N 3°12′54″W | Category C(S) | 45840 | Upload Photo |
| 53 Pentland Terrace, Riselaw House | | | | 55°54′43″N 3°12′44″W | Category B | 45841 | Upload Photo |
| 3 And 4 Swanston Village | | | | 55°53′32″N 3°12′55″W | Category C(S) | 45843 | Upload Photo |
| 27-31 (Odd Nos) Broughton Place And 1 And 1A East Broughton Place | | | | 55°57′32″N 3°11′15″W | Category B | 45927 | Upload Photo |
| 113 And 115 Broughton Street | | | | 55°57′33″N 3°11′25″W | Category C(S) | 45935 | Upload Photo |
| 79-85 (Odd Nos) East Claremont Street | | | | 55°57′46″N 3°11′31″W | Category A | 45941 | Upload Photo |
| 7-11 (Odd Nos) Forth Street | | | | 55°57′27″N 3°11′16″W | Category B | 45946 | Upload Photo |
| 4 Lasswade Road | | | | 55°54′47″N 3°09′35″W | Category C(S) | 45982 | Upload Photo |
| 24-30 (Even Nos) Dean Street, Former Secession Church And St Bernard's Church School | | | | 55°57′30″N 3°12′40″W | Category C(S) | 46337 | Upload Photo |
| 1-11 (Inclusive Nos) Canning Street Lane And 2 Canning Street, Atholl House | | | | 55°56′53″N 3°12′38″W | Category C(S) | 46521 | Upload Photo |
| Newhailes Policies, Wanton Walls Farmhouse And Steading | | | | 55°56′14″N 3°05′11″W | Category C(S) | 46550 | Upload Photo |
| 16 And 18 Primrose Bank Road, With Boundary Walls And Gatepiers | | | | 55°58′45″N 3°12′30″W | Category C(S) | 46742 | Upload Photo |
| 34 Primrose Bank Road, Craigallan, With Boundary Wall And Gatepiers | | | | 55°58′46″N 3°12′35″W | Category B | 46744 | Upload Photo |
| 76 Trinity Road And 5 Spencer Place, Birnam Lodge, With Boundary Walls And Gatepiers | | | | 55°58′36″N 3°12′23″W | Category C(S) | 46750 | Upload Photo |
| 110 And 112 Trinity Road And 21A Russell Place, With Porte Cochere, Boundary Walls And Gatepiers | | | | 55°58′43″N 3°12′21″W | Category C(S) | 46752 | Upload Photo |
| 17 York Road, Provost's Lamp | | | | 55°58′38″N 3°12′11″W | Category B | 46759 | Upload Photo |
| 65-67 (Odd Nos) Ravelston Dykes Road | | | | 55°57′02″N 3°15′15″W | Category B | 46974 | Upload Photo |
| 1 And 2 Glengyle Terrace And 40-44 (Even Nos) Leven Street, Including Railings | | | | 55°56′27″N 3°12′12″W | Category C(S) | 47028 | Upload Photo |
| 3-5 (Inclusive Nos) Glengyle Terrace Including Railings | | | | 55°56′28″N 3°12′10″W | Category C(S) | 47029 | Upload Photo |
| 6-8 (Inclusive Nos) Glengyle Terrace, Including Railings | | | | 55°56′28″N 3°12′09″W | Category C(S) | 47030 | Upload Photo |
| 12-14 (Inclusive Nos) Glengyle Terrace, Including Railings | | | | 55°56′28″N 3°12′07″W | Category C(S) | 47032 | Upload Photo |
| 15-17 (Inclusive Nos) Glengyle Terrace, Including Railings | | | | 55°56′28″N 3°12′05″W | Category C(S) | 47033 | Upload Photo |
| 59 Lauriston Place, Lauriston Church (Former United Presbyterian), Including Wall And Railings | | | | 55°56′41″N 3°12′01″W | Category C(S) | 47035 | Upload Photo |
| 7, 8, 9, 16 And 17 Cramond Village | | | | 55°58′47″N 3°18′01″W | Category B | 47284 | Upload Photo |
| 1-7 (Odd Nos) Spittal Street And 35 And 37 Bread Street | | | | 55°56′46″N 3°12′14″W | Category B | 47578 | Upload Photo |
| Parkside Well-Head | | | | 55°56′31″N 3°10′43″W | Category C(S) | 47585 | Upload another image |
| 26-28 (Inclusive Nos) Castle Terrace, Including Boundary Wall And Railings | | | | 55°56′50″N 3°12′11″W | Category A | 47853 | Upload Photo |
| 21-29 (Odd Nos) Grassmarket | | | | 55°56′49″N 3°11′50″W | Category C(S) | 47868 | Upload Photo |
| 81 Grassmarket | | | | 55°56′52″N 3°11′40″W | Category B | 47871 | Upload Photo |
| 1 Merchant Street | | | | 55°56′51″N 3°11′33″W | Category B | 47895 | Upload Photo |
| 23-27 (Inclusive Nos) Greenside Place | | | | 55°57′25″N 3°11′06″W | Category B | 48035 | Upload another image |
| 6 Davie Street, Former Heriot's School, Including Boundary Walls, Gates And Gatepiers | | | | 55°56′43″N 3°10′57″W | Category B | 48083 | Upload Photo |
| 15-19 (Inclusive Nos) Bristo Place And 1-3 (Odd Nos) Teviot Place | | | | 55°56′45″N 3°11′23″W | Category C(S) | 48212 | Upload Photo |
| Edinburgh Castle, National War Museum Of Scotland (Former Hospital And Ordnance Store), Including Sentry Boxes And Urns | | | | 55°56′55″N 3°12′05″W | Category B | 48223 | Upload Photo |
| Edinburgh Castle, New Barracks | | | | 55°56′54″N 3°12′05″W | Category A | 48224 | Upload another image |
| Edinburgh Castle, Old Guardhouse, Including Inner Barrier | | | | 55°56′56″N 3°11′57″W | Category B | 48225 | Upload Photo |
| Edinburgh Castle Esplanade, 72Nd Highlanders Memorial | | | | 55°56′56″N 3°11′53″W | Category C(S) | 48237 | Upload Photo |
| 28-32 (Even Nos) Forrest Road And 19-22 (Inclusive Nos) Teviot Place | | | | 55°56′42″N 3°14′20″W | Category C(S) | 48243 | Upload Photo |
| 503-509 (Odd Nos) Lawnmarket And 13-17A (Odd Nos) James Court | | | | 55°56′58″N 3°11′39″W | Category B | 48245 | Upload Photo |
| Edinburgh Castle Esplanade, Monument To Colonel Mackenzie | | | | 55°56′56″N 3°11′51″W | Category B | 48257 | Upload another image |
| 78-79 Angle Park Terrace (Former Fire Station) | | | | 55°56′16″N 3°13′31″W | Category C(S) | 48283 | Upload Photo |
| Niddrie Mains Road, Thistle Foundation Estate, The Robin Chapel (Inter-Denominational) With Entrance Gates And Gatepiers | | | | 55°55′53″N 3°07′50″W | Category A | 48686 | Upload another image See more images |
| 15 And 17 Kinellan Road, Including Boundary Walls | | | | 55°56′56″N 3°14′59″W | Category C(S) | 48892 | Upload Photo |
| 8 Morningside Road, (Bank Of Scotland) Including Boundary Wall And Gatepiers | | | | 55°56′03″N 3°12′38″W | Category B | 48939 | Upload Photo |
| 12 And 13 Earlston Place With Retaining Wall | | | | 55°57′27″N 3°10′01″W | Category C(S) | 49052 | Upload Photo |
| 2 Easter Road, Techbase (Former Regent Road School) Including Boundary Walls, Railings And Outbuilding | | | | 55°57′25″N 3°10′21″W | Category B | 49054 | Upload Photo |
| 1 And 3 Montrose Terrace, Stag And Turret Public House With Retaining Walls, Steps, Railings And Gate | | | | 55°57′24″N 3°10′19″W | Category B | 49059 | Upload another image |
| 271 Canongate, Former Canongate United Presbyterian Church, Including Boundary Wall And Railings | | | | 55°57′03″N 3°11′01″W | Category C(S) | 49077 | Upload Photo |
| 13 High Street, At Baron Maule's Close And Trunk's Close, Sandeman House, Including Landscaped Garden In Hope's Court | | | | 55°57′04″N 3°11′07″W | Category C(S) | 49079 | Upload Photo |
| 21-23 (Inclusive Nos) Gayfield Square Including Railings | | | | 55°57′35″N 3°11′07″W | Category B | 49148 | Upload Photo |
| 15 Union Street Including Railings And Boundary Wall | | | | 55°57′29″N 3°11′09″W | Category B | 49153 | Upload Photo |
| 19-23 (Odd Numbers) Bonaly Road | | | | 55°54′03″N 3°15′33″W | Category C(S) | 49547 | Upload Photo |
| Colinton Road, Merchiston Castle School, The Castle Gates, (Headmaster's House) | | | | 55°54′39″N 3°15′16″W | Category C(S) | 49555 | Upload Photo |
| Colinton Road, Redford Infantry Barracks With Officers' Mess, Alma House, Guard House, Former Band Block, Former Sergeants' Mess, Gates, Gatepiers And Other Ancillary Buildings | | | | 55°54′37″N 3°14′44″W | Category B | 49560 | Upload another image See more images |
| Gillespie Road, Former Railway Bridge, Near Spylaw Farm | | | | 55°54′23″N 3°16′07″W | Category C(S) | 49564 | Upload Photo |
| 7 Pentland Avenue With Boundary Wall, Steps And Garden Terrace | | | | 55°54′30″N 3°15′40″W | Category B | 49565 | Upload Photo |
| 1 And 1B Thorburn Road, Lady Anderson Memorial Cottage | | | | 55°54′30″N 3°15′08″W | Category C(S) | 49570 | Upload Photo |
| 15/1-4, 15/9-15, 15/17-22, 15/27-31 Thorburn Road, (All Inclusive Numbers) And 4 Redford Road, The Cottage Homes, With Sundial, Boundary Walls, Gates And Gatepiers | | | | 55°54′29″N 3°15′06″W | Category C(S) | 49571 | Upload Photo |
| 4-9 (Inclusive Nos) Brunton Place Including Railings | | | | 55°57′28″N 3°10′29″W | Category A | 49744 | Upload Photo |
| 5 Carlton Terrace Including Railings And Boundary Walls | | | | 55°57′22″N 3°10′25″W | Category A | 49747 | Upload Photo |
| 15 Carlton Terrace Including Railings And Boundary Walls | | | | 55°57′24″N 3°10′28″W | Category A | 49757 | Upload another image |
| 15 Regent Terrace, Including Railings And Boundary Walls | | | | 55°57′17″N 3°10′36″W | Category A | 49778 | Upload another image |
| 32 Regent Terrace Including Railings And Boundary Walls | | | | 55°57′20″N 3°10′29″W | Category A | 49797 | Upload another image |
| 23 Royal Terrace Including Railings And Boundary Walls | | | | 55°57′24″N 3°10′40″W | Category A | 49814 | Upload Photo |
| 24 Royal Terrace Including Railings And Boundary Walls | | | | 55°57′24″N 3°10′40″W | Category A | 49815 | Upload Photo |
| 27 Royal Terrace Including Railings And Boundary Walls | | | | 55°57′24″N 3°10′38″W | Category A | 49818 | Upload Photo |
| 28 Royal Terrace Including Railings And Boundary Walls | | | | 55°57′24″N 3°10′38″W | Category A | 49819 | Upload Photo |
| Pitsligo Road, Woodcroft Telephone Exchange Including Boundary Walls | | | | 55°55′54″N 3°12′16″W | Category C(S) | 50035 | Upload Photo |
| South Queensferry, 1 And 2 Scotstoun House, Including Coachhouse And Garden Walls | | | | 55°58′51″N 3°23′37″W | Category B | 50165 | Upload Photo |
| 18 Holyrood Park Road, University Of Edinburgh, Pollock Halls Of Residence Phases I And II: South Hall (Formerly Holland House, Fraser House And Refectory), Holland House (Blocks A, B, C And D) | | | | 55°56′17″N 3°10′13″W | Category A | 50187 | Upload another image |
| 44 And 46 The Pleasance, University Of Edinburgh Centre For Sport And Exercise (Former Brewery And Offices) | | | | 55°56′53″N 3°10′53″W | Category C(S) | 50193 | Upload Photo |
| Shore Road, Port Edgar, Capstan | | | | 55°59′35″N 3°24′33″W | Category C(S) | 50854 | Upload Photo |
| 47-49 Lanark Road | | | | 55°55′21″N 3°14′58″W | Category C(S) | 51159 | Upload Photo |
| 3 Drummond Street, Rutherford's Bar | | | | 55°56′51″N 3°11′08″W | Category B | 51176 | Upload Photo |
| 1-7 (Odd Nos) Roxburgh Street, Including Railings | | | | 55°56′52″N 3°10′59″W | Category C(S) | 51180 | Upload Photo |
| 87 Boswall Parkway, St Margaret Mary's Presbytery | | | | 55°58′32″N 3°13′58″W | Category C(S) | 45648 | Upload Photo |
| 37 Granton Park Avenue, Former Madelvic Works, Office, Production Block, And Generating Block Only | | | | 55°58′50″N 3°13′58″W | Category B | 45654 | Upload Photo |
| 14 Belford Mews | | | | 55°57′06″N 3°13′11″W | Category B | 45580 | Upload Photo |
| Dundas Castle, Blue Acre, Including Boundary Wall | | | | 55°58′35″N 3°24′58″W | Category C(S) | 45470 | Upload Photo |
| Dundas Castle, Castle Grove, Including Railings | | | | 55°58′39″N 3°25′26″W | Category C(S) | 45473 | Upload Photo |
| Royal Circus Gardens, Railings And Gates, Including Lamps | | | | 55°57′24″N 3°12′15″W | Category B | 45520 | Upload Photo |
| Craigiehall, Walled Garden, Including Gatepiers | | | | 55°57′55″N 3°20′09″W | Category A | 45433 | Upload Photo |
| 70-76 (Even Nos) Grove Street | | | | 55°56′36″N 3°12′41″W | Category C(S) | 44939 | Upload Photo |

== Key ==
The scheme for classifying buildings in Scotland is:

- Category A: "buildings of national or international importance, either architectural or historic; or fine, little-altered examples of some particular period, style or building type."
- Category B: "buildings of regional or more than local importance; or major examples of some particular period, style or building type, which may have been altered."
- Category C: "buildings of local importance; lesser examples of any period, style, or building type, as originally constructed or moderately altered; and simple traditional buildings which group well with other listed buildings."

In March 2016 there were 47,288 listed buildings in Scotland. Of these, 8% were Category A, and 50% were Category B, with the remaining 42% being Category C.

== See also ==
- List of listed buildings in Edinburgh
