= Abbey House, Ranton =

Abbey House
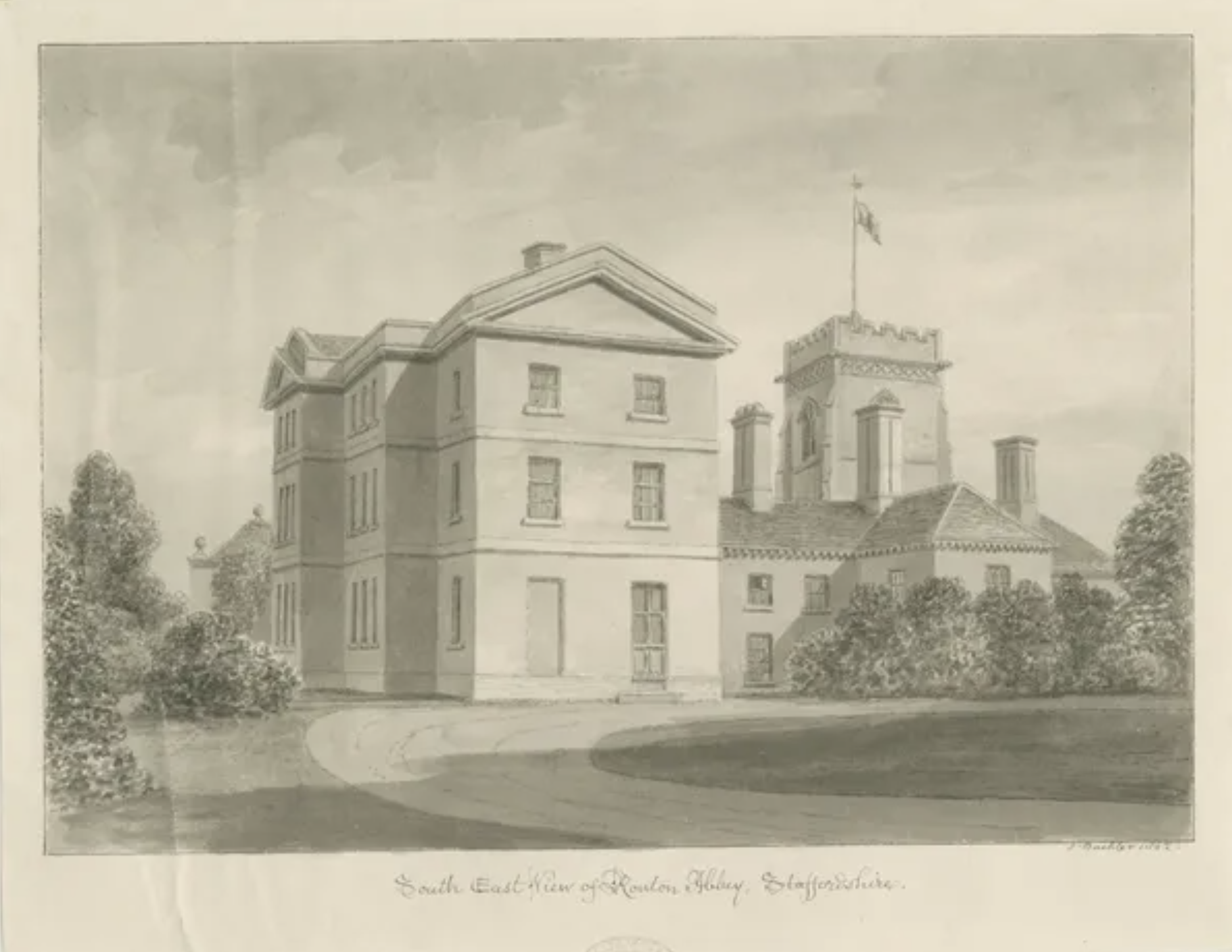
- Ranton Abbey House in 1842.
- Interactive map of the Abbey House area
- Alternative names: Ranton Abbey House

General information
- Type: Stately home
- Location: Ranton, Staffordshire, England
- Coordinates: 52.81554°N 2.24113°W
- Construction started: 1820

Abbey House is an early 19th-century ruined stately home in Ranton, Staffordshire, England.

== History ==
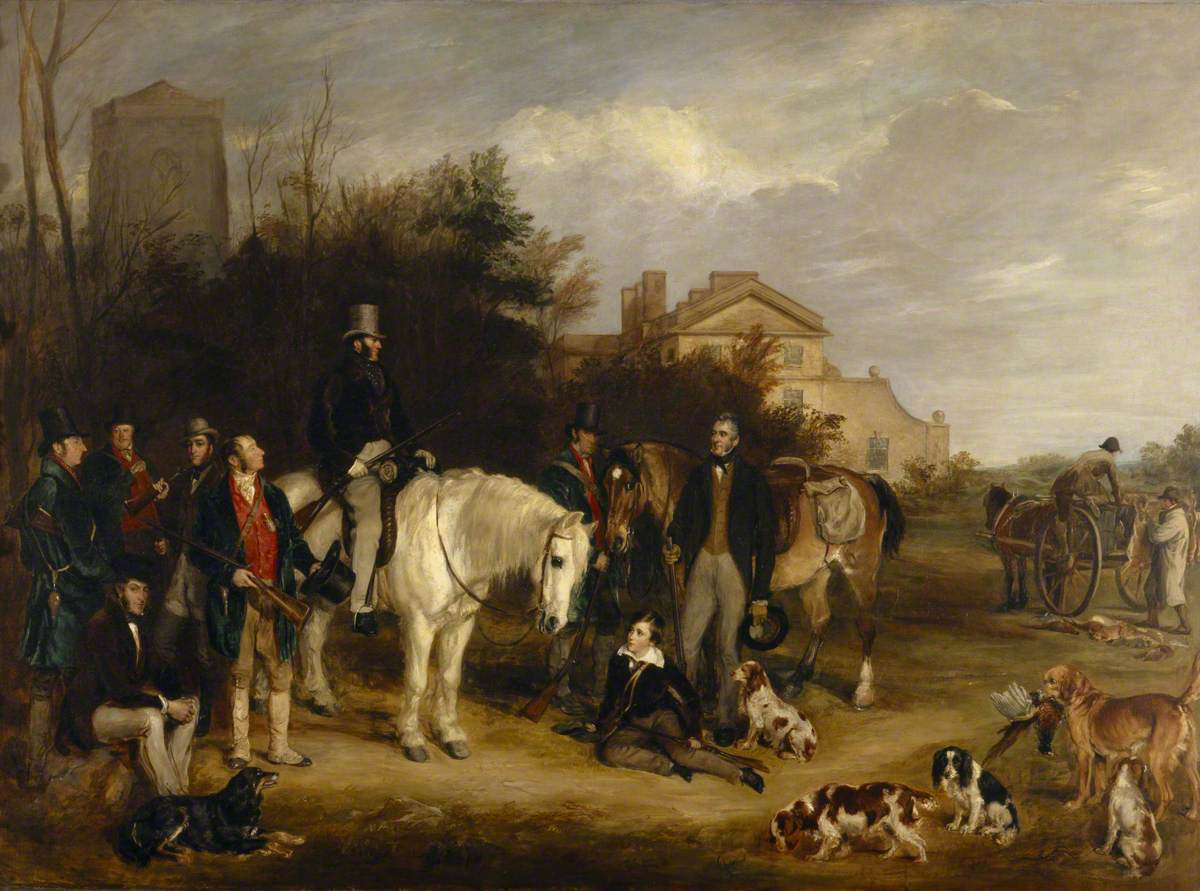
A Shooting Party at Ranton Abbey, Staffordshire by Francis Grant, 1839. Amongst those depicted is the Prime Minister Lord Melbourne.

The red-brick Regency house was built in 1820 by Thomas Anson the 1st Earl of Lichfield as a second seat for his family based at Shugborough Hall. The 300-acre estate is also the site of Ranton Abbey, one of many Augustinian abbeys founded across England from the 1140s to the 1160s. Today, only the imposing 15th-century church tower survives.

The Ranton Estate was purchased c. 1819 by Viscount Anson, who was created the First Earl of Lichfield in the coronation honours of King William IV in 1831. He spent large sums of money improving the estate and the house, which was used as a centre for sporting hospitality hosting great shooting parties, for distinguished guests, including Sir Francis Grant (who was to become president of the Royal Academy); Lord Melbourne, then prime minister; Lord Sefton and the Earl of Uxbridge. The house has been a mere shell since being gutted by fire in 1942, when the bodyguard of Queen Wilhelmina of the Netherlands were stationed there.

The estate was sold to the Wedgwood porcelain company in the 1950s but bought back by Patrick Lichfield, the 5th Earl, in 1987 with a view to restoring the house or building a replacement. Realisation of these plans was delayed for many years due to objections from English Heritage. Permission was finally granted in December 2005, only a month after Lichfield died. The estate was sold in 2008, and again in July 2011 for around £3.5 million.
