= Ratho railway station =

Disused railway station in Ratho, Midlothian

Ratho
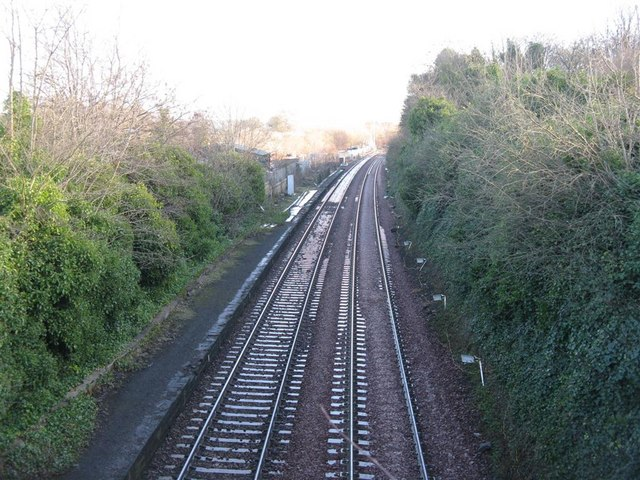
- The site of the station in 2008

General information
- Location: Ratho, Midlothian; Scotland
- Coordinates: 55.9348°N 3.3894°W
- Grid reference: NT133721
- Platforms: 3

Other information
- Status: Disused

History
- Original company: Edinburgh and Glasgow Railway High level North British Railway Low level
- Pre-grouping: North British Railway
- Post-grouping: London and North Eastern Railway

Key dates
- 18 December 1842: High level station opened
- 1 March 1866: Low level station opened
- 22 September 1930: Low level station closed to passengers
- 18 June 1951: High level station closed
Location

Ratho railway stations served the village of Ratho, historically in the county of Midlothian, Scotland from 1842 to 1951 on the Edinburgh and Glasgow Railway and the North British Railway.

== History ==
=== High Level ===
The station opened on 18 December 1842 by the Edinburgh and Glasgow Railway on the main line. A village to the north was named after this station. In between the junction with the South Queensferry branch was the goods yard and on the eastbound platform was the goods yard. This was downgraded to a ground frame in 1939. The station closed on 18 June 1951.

=== Low Level ===
This station opened on 1 March 1866 by the North British Railway on the South Queensferry branch line; it only had one platform. It was situated slightly north of the high level station. It closed on 22 September 1930.

== See also ==
- Ratho
- Ratho Station
- Ratho rail crash

Preceding station	Historical railways	Following station
Gogar; Line open, station closed	North British Railway; Edinburgh and Glasgow Railway	Broxburn (briefly) or Winchburgh from high level Line open, station closed
	Disused railways	
Gogar; Line open, station closed	North British Railway; South Queensferry branch	Kirkliston from low level Line and station closed
