= Ranton Green =

Village in Staffordshire, England

Coordinates: 52.803°N 2.230°W

Ranton Green is a small village in Staffordshire about a mile southwest of Ranton, Staffordshire and a mile northeast of Gnosall. It consists of a few cottages and farms, but no shops or church. The local public house was called the Hand & Cleaver, but has since been converted into dwellings, which lies about 1 mile southeast of Ranton Abbey.
