= Ranton Abbey =

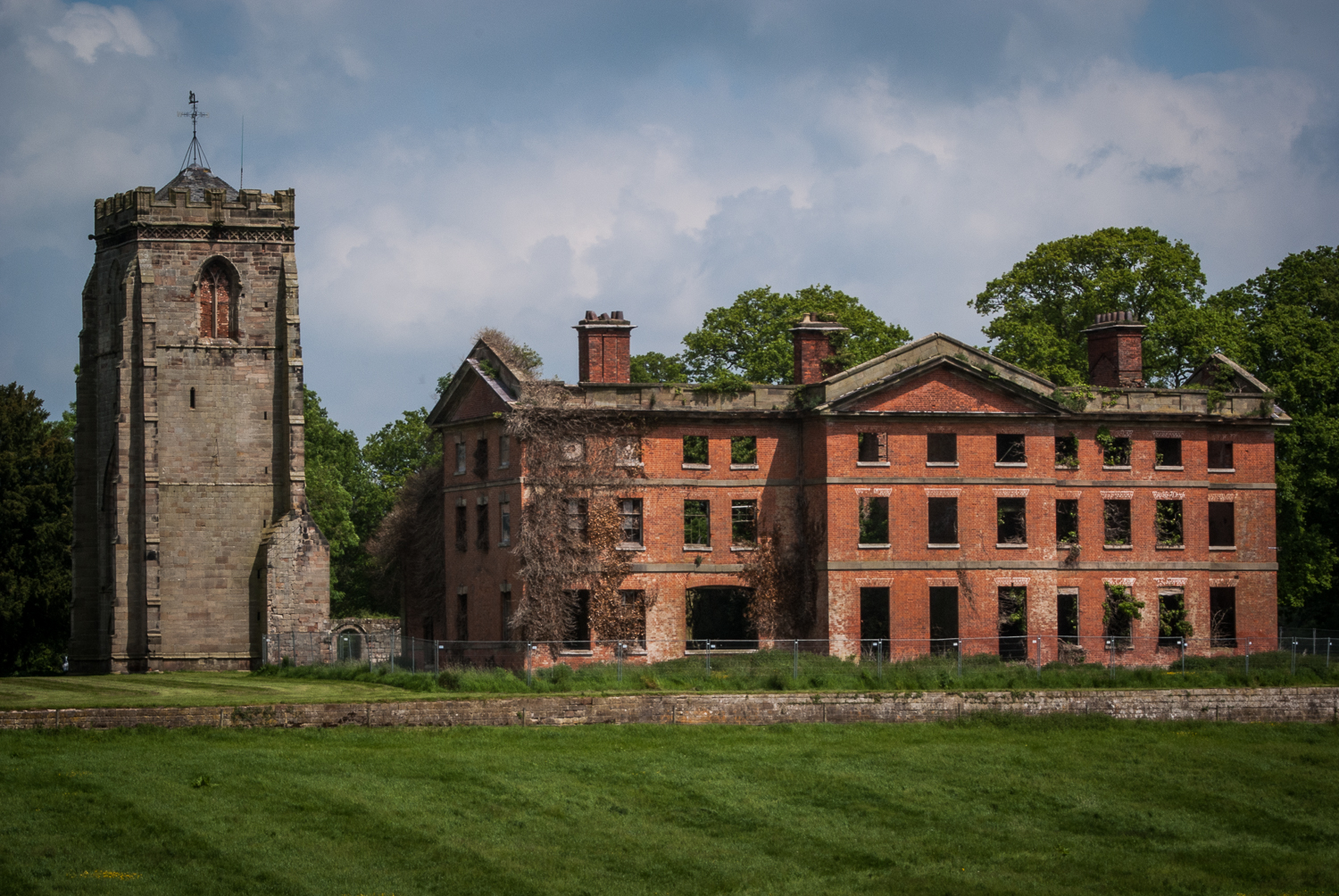
- Ranton Abbey tower and ivy-covered remains of Abbey House, destroyed by fire in World War II, viewed from southwest, May 2008
- Interactive map of the Ranton Abbey area
- Alternative names: Ranton Priory

General information
- Type: Priory
- Location: Ranton, Staffordshire, England
- Coordinates: 52.81576°N 2.24149°W
- Construction started: circa 1150

Ranton Abbey or Ranton Priory was an Augustinian Priory in Ranton, Staffordshire, England, built c.1150 by Robert fitz Noel of Ellenhall. The priory flourished in the 13th century as a subordinate house to Haughmond Abbey (near Shrewsbury). Ranton was dissolved by the Suppression of Religious Houses Act 1535 for dissolving the lesser monasteries.

Only the 14th–15th century tower and part of the south wall remain, although the cloisters and other parts are known to have still been standing in 1663. Many important personages were buried in the abbey including Sir Thomas Harcourt, Knt., of Stanton Harcourt, who died 12 April 1417. The ruins of Abbey House stand adjacent.

Accord to Michael Raven (2004), Ranton Abbey:

"was founded by Robert and Celestia Noel of Ellenhall about 1150 for Augustinian canons from Haughmond. In 1820 Thomas, 1st Earl of Lichfield, built a large house, a hunting lodge or weekend retreat, adjacent to the abbey...all that remains of the abbey is the large imposing tower (of the 15th century) and a little of the nave wall with a Norman doorway decorated with roll moulding. The house is now in ruins as it was accidentally burned down in 1942, during the Second World War, when troops of Queen Wilhelmina's bodyguard were quartered here."

According to William White in his 1851 History, Gazetteer and Directory of Staffordshire:

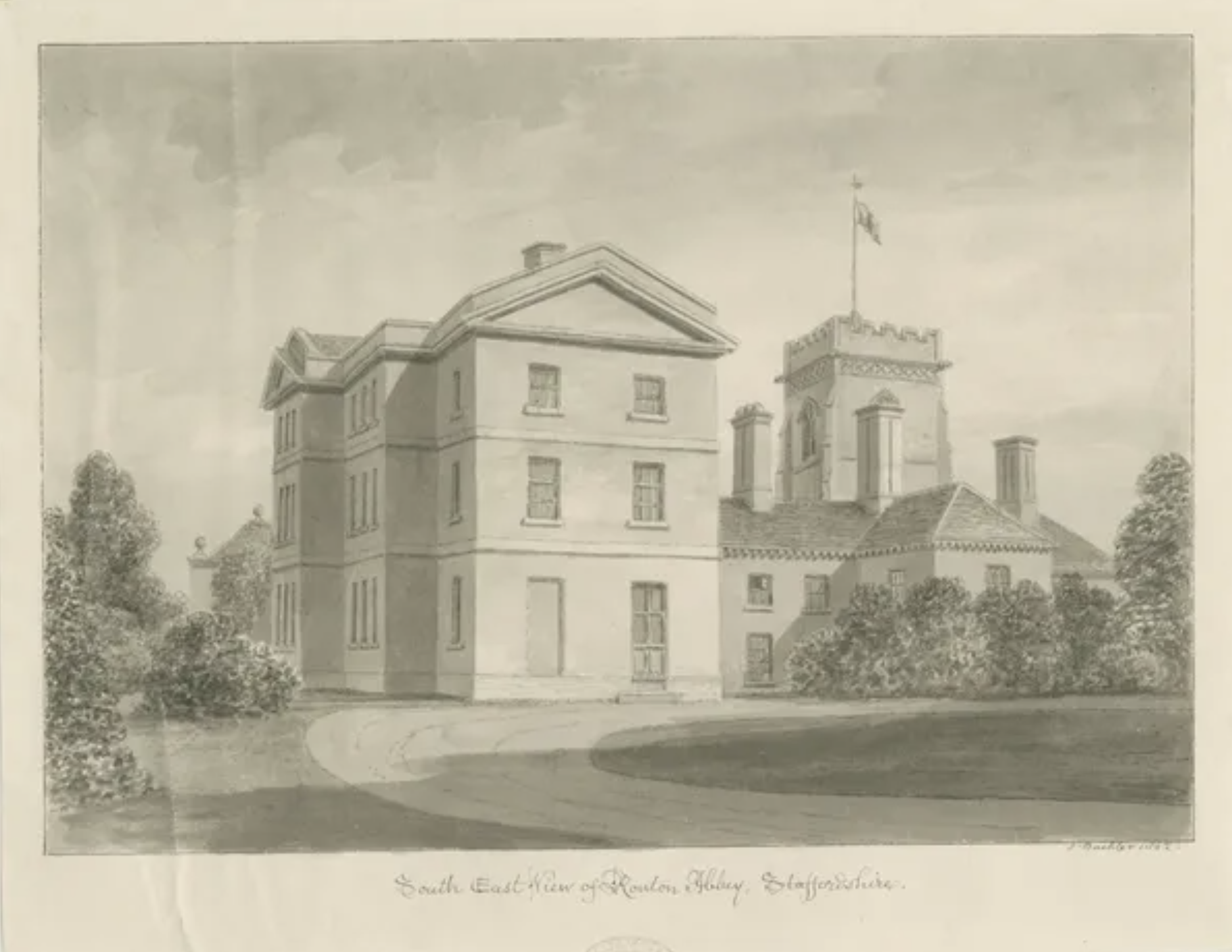
Ranton Abbey House in 1842 by John Buckler.

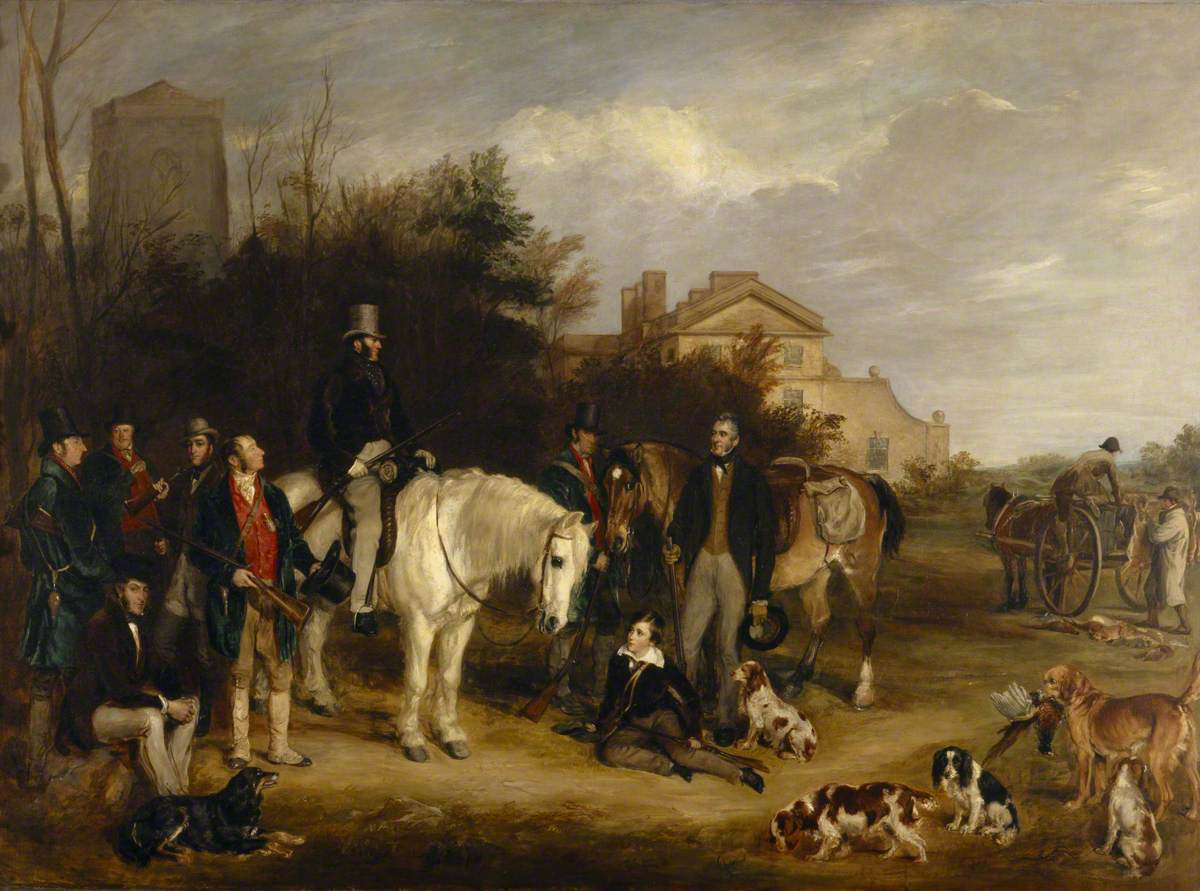
A Shooting Party at Ranton Abbey by Sir Francis Grant, 1839

"Ranton, or Ronton, is a small scattered village, five miles (8 km) W of Stafford, comprising within its parish the scattered hamlets of Extolls, Long Compton, Park Nook, and including 320 inhabitants, and about 2670 acres of land, belonging chiefly to the Earl of Lichfield, and Francis Eld, Esq, and the former is lord of the manor, which, at the time of the Norman Conquest, was held by Goderick, a Saxon nobleman, and afterwards by the Noels and Harcourts. Swynfen Jones, Esq, and a few smaller owners have estates in the parish.

About a mile W of the village is Ranton Abbey, an extra parochial liberty of 700 acres belonging to the Earl of Lichfield. The ancient abbey was founded by Robert Fitz-Noel, in the reign of Henry II, for regular canons of the order of St Augustine. Considerable remains of the abbey are still standing, including a lofty well-built tower, and the outer walls of the church. The abbey liberty contains 28 inhabitants and the Abbey House which is the seat of ED Moore, Esq."

== See also ==
- Grade II* listed buildings in Stafford (borough)
- Listed buildings in Ellenhall
