= Listed buildings in Ranton, Staffordshire =

Ranton is a civil parish in the Borough of Stafford, Staffordshire, England. It contains four listed buildings that are recorded in the National Heritage List for England. All the listed buildings are designated at Grade II, the lowest of the three grades, which is applied to "buildings of national importance and special interest". The parish contains the village of Ranton and the surrounding countryside. The listed buildings consist of a church, a farmhouse, a cottage, and a milepost.

== Buildings ==
| Name and location | Photograph | Date | Notes |
|---|---|---|---|
| All Saints Church; 52.81560°N 2.21653°W | | 13th century | The chancel was added in 1753. The church consists of a nave, which is in stone and in Early English style with lancet windows, and a chancel in brick. There are two doorways, the south doorway has colonettes, and the north doorway has a depressed arch and continuous roll-moulding. The east window has a pointed head and three lights, and on the west gable end is a double bellcote. |
| Vicarage Farmhouse; 52.80752°N 2.20264°W | — | 16th century | The farmhouse, which was later altered, is in timber framing and stone, and is on a stone plinth. There are two storeys and two bays. The windows are mullioned and contain modern casements. Inside, there is Jacobean panelling. |
| The Thatched Cottage; 52.80578°N 2.22468°W | — | Late 18th or early 19th century | The cottage is in yellow brick and has a thatched roof, one storey, and an attic. In the centre is a doorway, to itsleft is a three-light casement window with a segmental head, and above is an eyebrow dormer. |
| Milepost; 52.82137°N 2.22859°W | — | Mid 19th century | The milepost is on the northwest side of the Stafford to Newport road (B5405 road). It is in cast iron and has a triangular plan and a sloping top. The milepost is inscribed "Parish of Seighford" and the distances to London, Stafford and Newport. |
