= Broxburn railway station =

Short-lived railway station in Broxburn, West Lothian

Coordinates: 55.9467°N 3.4452°W

Broxburn

General information
- Location: Broxburn, West Lothian; Scotland

Other information
- Status: Disused

History
- Original company: Edinburgh and Glasgow Railway

Key dates
- August 1843: Opened
- October 1844: Closed
- June 1848: Re-sited
- 12 November 1849: Closed permanently

Broxburn railway station served the town of Broxburn, West Lothian, Scotland, from 1843 to 1849 on the Edinburgh and Glasgow Railway.

== History ==
The station was opened in August 1843 by the Edinburgh and Glasgow Railway. The first site was too distant from the town so it closed a year later in October 1844. The second site opened in June 1848, this time being situated less than a mile from the town. This didn't prove to be any better so it closed permanently on 12 November 1849.

Preceding station	Historical railways	Following station
Ratho; Line open, station closed	Edinburgh and Glasgow Railway	Winchburgh; Line open, station closed
