= Saughton railway station =

Disused railway station in Saughton, Edinburgh

Saughton
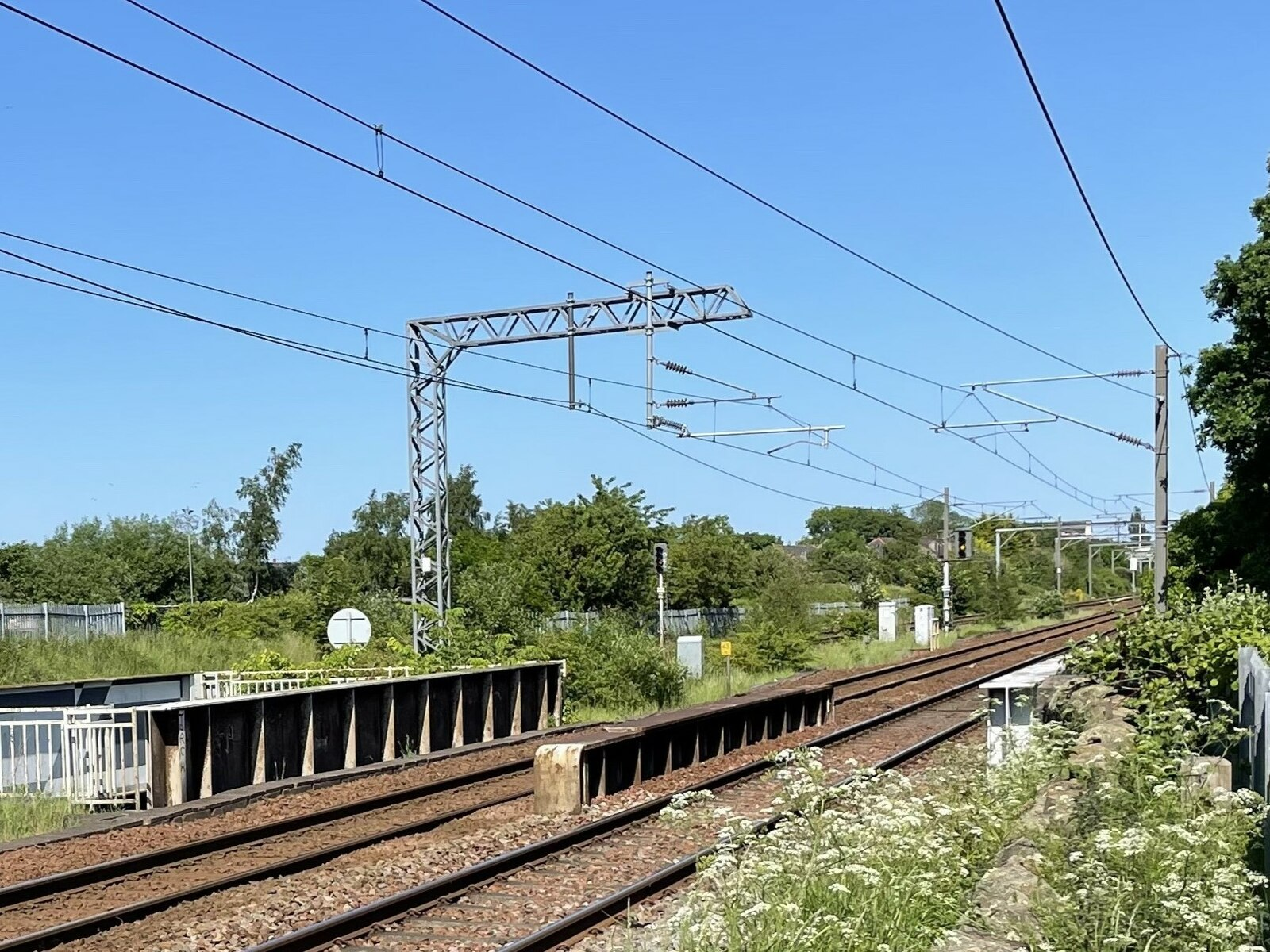
- The site of the former Saughton station in 2024

General information
- Location: Saughton, Edinburgh; Scotland
- Coordinates: 55.9329°N 3.2744°W
- Grid reference: NT204718
- Platforms: 4

Other information
- Status: Disused

History
- Original company: Edinburgh and Glasgow Railway
- Pre-grouping: North British Railway

Key dates
- 21 February 1842: Opened as Corstorphine
- 1 February 1902: Name changed to Saughton
- 1 January 1917: Closed due to wartime economy
- 1 February 1919: Reopened
- 1 March 1921: Closed
Location

Saughton railway station served the suburb of Saughton, Edinburgh, Scotland from 1842 to 1921 on the Edinburgh and Glasgow Railway.

== History ==
The station opened as Corstorphine on 21 February 1842 by the Edinburgh and Glasgow Railway. It initially had two platforms but two more were later added when the Forth Bridge opened. There were two goods yards, one to the north and one to the south. The northern one was expanded with more sidings. The station's name was changed to Saughton on 1 February 1902 and closed on 1 January 1917 but reopened on 1 February 1919 before closing permanently on 1 March 1921.

Preceding station	Historical railways	Following station
Haymarket; Line and station open	North British Railway; Edinburgh and Glasgow Railway	Gogar; Line open, station closed
Haymarket; Line and station open	North British Railway; Forth Bridge connecting lines	Turnhouse; Line open, station closed
