= Gogar railway station (1842–1930) =

Disused railway station in Gogar, Edinburgh

Gogar

General information
- Location: Gogar, Edinburgh; Scotland
- Coordinates: 55.926°N 3.3233°W
- Grid reference: NT174711
- Platforms: 2

Other information
- Status: Disused

History
- Original company: Edinburgh and Glasgow Railway
- Pre-grouping: North British Railway
- Post-grouping: London and North Eastern Railway

Key dates
- July 1842: Opened
- 22 September 1930: Closed
Location

Gogar railway station served the area of Gogar, Edinburgh, Scotland from 1842 to 1930 on the Edinburgh and Glasgow Railway

== History ==
The station opened in July 1842 by the Edinburgh and Glasgow Railway. To the east was the goods station. The passenger station closed on 22 September 1930.

Preceding station	Historical railways	Following station
Saughton; Line open, station closed	North British Railway; Edinburgh and Glasgow Railway	Ratho high level Line open, station closed
Saughton; Line open, station closed	North British Railway; South Queensferry branch	Ratho low level Line partly open, station closed
