= Appleshaw =

Village in Hampshire, England

Coordinates: 51.237°N 1.559°W

- Village
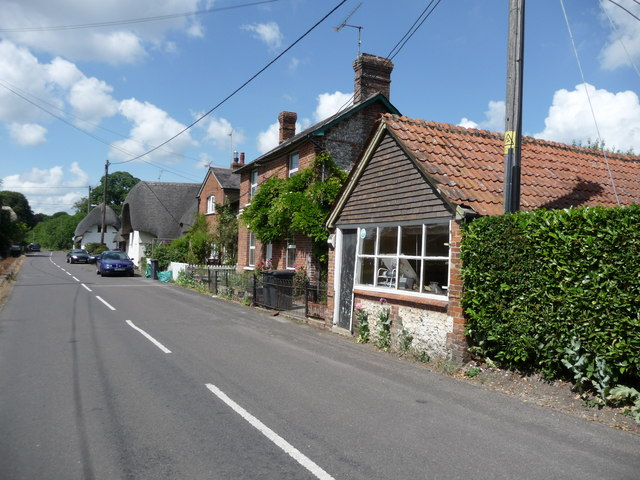
- Picture of some houses on the village's main road

- Location within Hampshire
- Population: 487; 503 (2011 Census)
- OS grid reference: SU308487
- District: Test Valley
- Shire county: Hampshire
- Region: South East
- Country: England
- Sovereign state: United Kingdom
- Post town: Andover
- Postcode district: SP11
- Dialling code: 01264
- Police: Hampshire and Isle of Wight
- Fire: Hampshire and Isle of Wight
- Ambulance: South Central
- UK Parliament: Romsey and Southampton North

Appleshaw is a village and Civil parish in the Test Valley district of north-west Hampshire, England.

== Location ==
=== The Village ===
The village of Appleshaw ( /ˈæpl.ʃɔː/ ) is located close to several other villages. These include: Fyfield, Thruxton, Kimpton, Redenham and Weyhill. There are also 3 local towns; Ludgershall and Tidworth in the county of Wiltshire, and Andover in Hampshire.

=== The Civil Parish ===
The Civil parish of Appleshaw borders the other civil parishes of: Kimpton, Kyfield and Penton Grafton in Hampshire, and Chute Forest and Ludgershall in Wiltshire. Part of the border of the parish of Appleshaw makes up the Wiltshire-Hampshire border.

The parish includes a few hamlets as well as the village of Appleshaw. This includes Ragged Appleshaw which's name "ragged" could possibly come from a corruption of 'roe gate' - the gate of the Royal Deer Forset of Chute.

Parts of Redenham Park lie within the parish.

== History ==
=== Fairs ===
In 1658, the parish was granted the right to two annual fairs, Appleshaw became a rival to the great Weyhill sheep fair. In 1801, The Salisbury Journal reported that 15,000 sheep were sold at Appleshaw, a reduction on the previous year's total.

== Sports ==
W. G. Grace once played cricket here, with his bat made of Wallop willow.

=== Recreation areas ===
In the middle of the street a clock sticks out from a barn wall, placed there to celebrate Queen Victoria's jubilee.

The name Appleshaw is derived from Old English ‘scarga’ - a shaugh or wood; thus Appleshaw may mean ‘apple wood’.

== Education ==
Appleshaw has one school, Appleshaw St Peter's CE Primary School.
