= Philpstoun railway station =

Former railway station in Scotland

Philpstoun

General information
- Location: Philpstoun, West Lothian; Scotland
- Coordinates: 55.9773°N 3.5161°W
- Platforms: 2

Other information
- Status: Disused

History
- Original company: Edinburgh and Glasgow Railway
- Pre-grouping: North British Railway
- Post-grouping: London and North Eastern Railway

Key dates
- 21 February 1842: Opened
- 18 June 1951: Closed
Location

Philpstoun railway station was a railway station in the village of Philpstoun, to the east of Linlithgow in West Lothian, Scotland. It was located on the Edinburgh and Glasgow Railway.

== History ==
Philpstoun station was opened by the Edinburgh and Glasgow Railway on 21 February 1842. It was closed on 18 June 1951 by British Railways.

The area around Philpstoun, in common with others in West Lothian, was an extremely busy centre for shale mining and petroleum manufacturing for almost a century, and this was reflected in the railways around Philpstoun. The station itself was situated in a deep cutting, and had two platforms. Immediately to the west, a facing junction, with crossovers and a looping facilities connected to a set of exchange sidings at Westfield, and these ran into Philpstoun No 1 shale mine. Extensive sidings connected within the facility, and a short branch ran just west of the (still extant) shale bings, crossing the canal, and continuing past Easter Pardovan in a southerly direction to serve a shale pit at Ochiltree (just north west of Threemiletown). A tramway ran in the same direction on the eastern flank of the bings. A trailing siding left the main up line near Pardovan, this was known as Pardovan siding and originally served a quarry.

Further west, a line branched from the down main via a trailing junction and ran adjacent to the mainline for some 500 yards before swinging south west, passing Champfleurie, before swinging south to serve oil works and a shale mine between Bridgend and Wester Ochiltree.

The course of these lines can be seen on Sheet 32 (Ordnance Survey Maps One-inch "Third" edition, Scotland, 1903–1912) on the National Library of Scotland digital library (Maps).

== Services ==
Preceding station	Historical railways	Following station
Winchburgh; Line open, station closed	North British Railway; Edinburgh and Glasgow Railway	Linlithgow; Line and Station open
Dalmeny; Line and station open	North British Railway; Forth Bridge connecting lines	Linlithgow; Line and Station open
