= Turnhouse railway station =

Disused railway station in Turnhouse, Edinburgh

Coordinates: 55.9508°N 3.3413°W

Turnhouse

General information
- Location: Turnhouse, Edinburgh; Scotland
- Platforms: 2

Other information
- Status: Disused

History
- Original company: North British Railway
- Pre-grouping: North British Railway
- Post-grouping: London and North Eastern Railway

Key dates
- 23 August 1897: Opened
- 22 September 1930: Closed
Location

Turnhouse railway station served the suburb of Turnhouse, Edinburgh, Scotland from 1897 to 1930 on the Forth Bridge Connecting Lines of the North British Railway.

== History ==
The station opened on 23 August 1897 by the North British Railway. To the east was the goods yard and to the southwest was the goods yard, which opened before the station in 1890 and closed in 1929. The station closed to passengers on 22 September 1930.

Preceding station	Historical railways	Following station
Saughton; Line open, station closed	North British Railway; Forth Bridge connecting lines	Dalmeny; Line and station open
