= Kirkliston railway station =

Disused railway station in Kirkliston, West Lothian

Coordinates: 55.9546°N 3.3999°W

Kirkliston
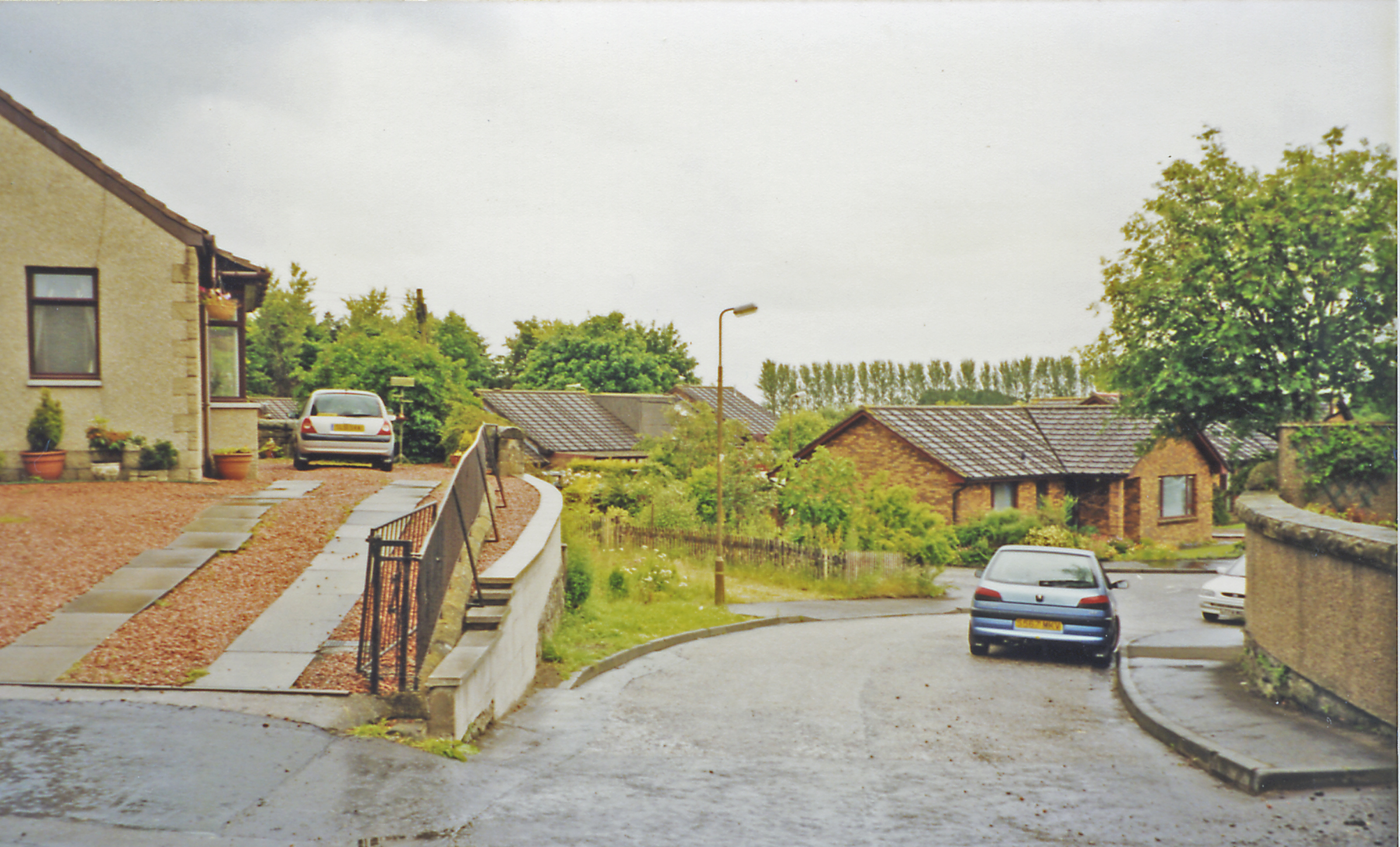
- The site of the station, looking southwest from Station Road, in 2002

General information
- Location: Kirkliston, West Lothian; Scotland
- Platforms: 1

Other information
- Status: Disused

History
- Original company: North British Railway
- Pre-grouping: North British Railway
- Post-grouping: London and North Eastern Railway

Key dates
- 1 March 1866: Opened
- 22 September 1930: Closed to passengers
- 7 February 1966: Closed to goods
Location

Kirkliston railway station served the village of Kirkliston, historically in the county of West Lothian, Scotland from 1866 to 1966 on the North British Railway.

== History ==
The station opened on 1 March 1866 by the North British Railway. To the east was the goods yard and to the southwest was the signal box, which opened in 1894. To the south were sidings that served Kirkliston Distillery. The station closed on 22 September 1930 but it remained open for goods until 7 February 1966.

Preceding station	Disused railways	Following station
Ratho Low Level; Line and station closed	North British Railway; South Queensferry Branch	Dalmeny; 1866-1890 station only or South Queensferry; Line and stations closed
