= Winchburgh railway station =

Disused railway station in Winchburgh, West Lothian

Coordinates: 55.9630°N 3.4601°W

Winchburgh

General information
- Location: Winchburgh, West Lothian; Scotland
- Platforms: 2

Other information
- Status: Disused

History
- Original company: Edinburgh and Glasgow Railway
- Pre-grouping: North British Railway
- Post-grouping: London and North Eastern Railway

Key dates
- 21 February 1842: Opened
- 22 September 1930: Closed
Location

Winchburgh railway station served the village of Winchburgh, West Lothian, Scotland from 1842 to 1930 on the Edinburgh and Glasgow Railway, now the Glasgow–Edinburgh via Falkirk line. It was located in a cutting about 200 m (660 ft) to the north of the Winchburgh Tunnel, and 900 m (3,000 ft) south-east of Winchburgh Junction. The station was about 400 m (1/4 mi) north of the village, close to the modern Duntarvie Castle Road bridge, which opened in 2024.

Proposals to reopen the station have been ongoing since 2010. A new railway station was granted planning consent in October 2025 but funding has not been confirmed.

== History ==
The station opened on 21 February 1842 by the Edinburgh and Glasgow Railway. To the west was Winchburgh Brick Works which was served by a tramway from north of the station. The signal box opened in 1886 but was only open for nine years, closing in 1895. The station closed on 22 September 1930.

== Proposed reopening ==
As a result of the significant new housing development being built around Winchburgh, there are plans to re-open the station. When the idea was proposed in 2010, there were also proposals to electrify the railway, and it was considered adding a new station would slow down trains. However, subsequent reports show the timetable would not be impacted.

Planning permission in principle was granted for a new station in 2012 as part of the Winchburgh masterplan.

In 2021, Transport Scotland committed to rebuilding the station at Winchburgh. However, by 2022 there were feats it might not go ahead due to rapidly escalating costs and reduced commuter demand post COVID.

Winchburgh Developments commissioned a report into reopening the station which was published in January 2024. This showed a potential catchment of 27,000 people and generate significant benefits.

In June 2025, Network Rail applied for planning permission for the new station, which would have two 160 m (520 ft) fully accessible platforms served from an overbridge, and parking for 100 cars and 24 bicycles.

West Lothian Council granted planning consent for the station on 27 October 2025. However, funding for the station has not been confirmed, with estimated costs of £20m or more. West Lothian Council will submit an application to the Scottish Government for funding.

Preceding station	Historical railways	Following station
Broxburn (briefly) or Ratho; Line open, station closed	North British Railway; Edinburgh and Glasgow Railway	Philpstoun; Line open, station closed
