= Philpstoun =

Coordinates: 55.97649°N 3.52871°W

Philpstoun: Scottish Gaelic: Baile Philip
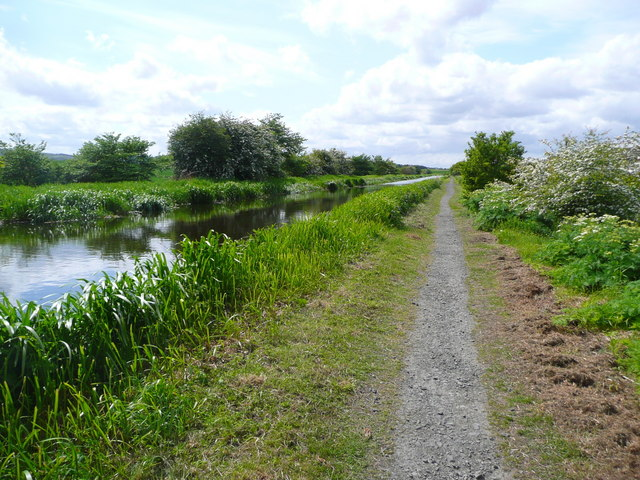
- The Union Canal at Philpstoun

- Location within West Lothian
- Population: Unknown (2017)
- OS grid reference: NT047770
- Council area: West Lothian
- Lieutenancy area: West Lothian
- Country: Scotland
- Sovereign state: United Kingdom
- Post town: LINLITHGOW
- Postcode district: EH49
- Dialling code: 01506
- Police: Scotland
- Fire: Scottish
- Ambulance: Scottish
- UK Parliament: Bathgate and Linlithgow
- Scottish Parliament: Linlithgow Lothian

Philpstoun is a small village in West Lothian, Scotland, situated roughly 2 miles (3.2 km) east of the historic county town of Linlithgow. The village originated in the oil shale mining boom of the 19th century. Surrounded by rich arable farm land, the village has a Community Education Centre and a Category B listed church. Philpstoun railway station closed in 1951 and Philpstoun and District Bowling Club closed in February 2012.

The bulk of the village lies between the Union Canal and the Glasgow–Edinburgh railway line, although the easternmost part, Old Philpstoun, lies north of the railway and closer to the M9 motorway.

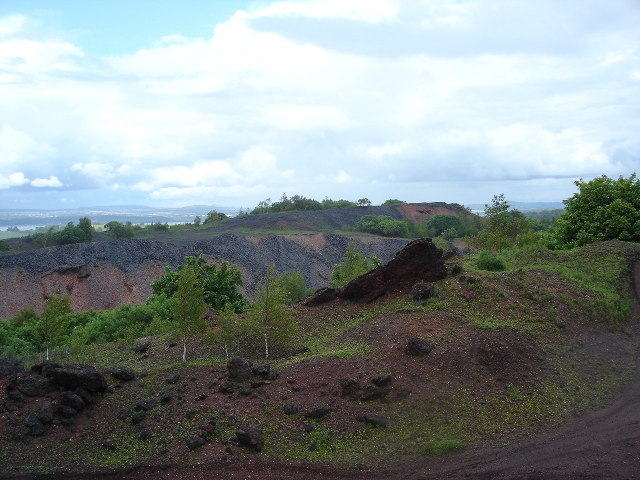
An oil shale bing near Philpstoun, the result of intensive mining from the middle of the 19th century to the middle of the 20th

== Community centre ==
Philpstoun Community Education Centre is owned and maintained by West Lothian Council. The building was constructed around 1910, originally being referred to as "The Institute at Philpstoun." The building was commissioned by James Ross and Co., Philpstoun Oil Works Ltd, and was constructed along with the three rows of terraced houses to the north of the centre in a development referred to as the "Philpstoun Garden City."
