= South Queensferry railway station =

Disused railway station in South Queensferry, Edinburgh

Coordinates: 55.9888°N 3.3960°W

South Queensferry

General information
- Location: South Queensferry, Edinburgh; Scotland
- Platforms: 1

Other information
- Status: Disused

History
- Original company: North British Railway
- Pre-grouping: North British Railway
- Post-grouping: London and North Eastern Railway

Key dates
- 1 June 1868: Opened
- 2 September 1878: Resited
- 5 March 1890: Closed
- 1 December 1919: Reopened as South Queensferry Halt
- 14 January 1929: Closed
Location

South Queensferry railway station served the town of South Queensferry, Edinburgh, Scotland from 1868 to 1929 on the South Queensferry Branch.

== History ==
=== First station ===
The station opened on 1 June 1868 by the North British Railway. To the north was the goods yard. The first station closed and was relocated when the line was extended to Port Edgar on 2 September 1878. It became a goods yard.

=== Second station ===
This station replaced the former terminus on 2 September 1878. It closed on 5 March 1890 but reopened on 1 December 1919 but as South Queensferry Halt. To the east was a siding. It closed permanently on 14 January 1929.

Preceding station	Disused railways	Following station
Dalmeny only from 1866-1890 Dalmeny station or Kirkliston; Line and stations closed	North British Railway; South Queensferry Branch	New Halls; Line and station closed
