= Ratho rail crash =

Scottish railway accident

Details
- Date: 3 January 1917; 16:35
- Location: Ratho Station
- Coordinates: 55.935°N 3.379°W
- Country: Scotland
- Line: Edinburgh and Glasgow Railway
- Cause: signalling failure

Statistics
- Trains: 2
- Deaths: 12
- Injured: 46

The Ratho rail crash occurred on 3 January 1917 and killed 12 people. It occurred near Ratho Station in Scotland when an express collided with a light engine in stormy weather.

Just west of the station lay Queensferry Junction where the line from Dalmeny via Kirkliston (now lifted) joined from the north. A train from Dalmeny came to a stand opposite the junction signalbox. The signalman had intended to keep it there until the 16:18 express from Edinburgh to Glasgow had passed. However he did not inform the driver and there was no fixed signal to hold him, instead a system of hand-signals was in use. The engine uncoupled and began to move towards the main line without his instructions. He put the main line signals to danger and blew his whistle but was unable to attract the driver's attention in the stormy conditions. The express, headed by NBR H class locomotive 874 Dunedin, was heavily laden with people returning from their New Year's holiday including many soldiers. It collided with the light engine at a speed of 30 mph (48 km/h), telescoping the first coach and derailing the second, killing 12 people and seriously injuring 46 more.

The Board of Trade inquiry led by Colonel J. W. Pringle found that the unsafe use of hand-signals to control access to passenger lines was the cause of the disaster.
