= Radnor, Cornwall =

Hamlet in Cornwall, England

Coordinates: 50°15′09″N 5°12′50″W

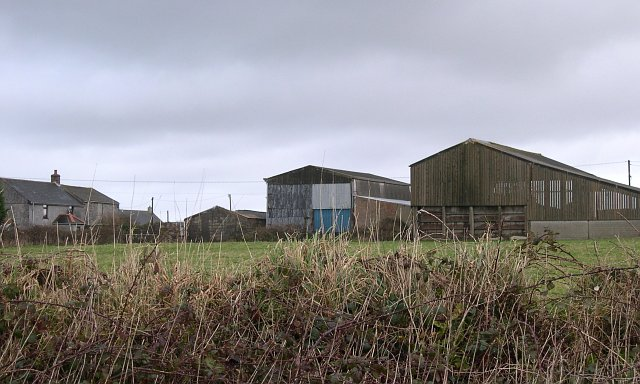
Farm buildings at Radnor

Radnor is a hamlet near Redruth in Cornwall, England. Radnor is northeast of Redruth and close to the A30 main road.
