= Ragged Appleshaw =

Hamlet in Hampshire, England

Coordinates: 51.236151°N 1.559975°W

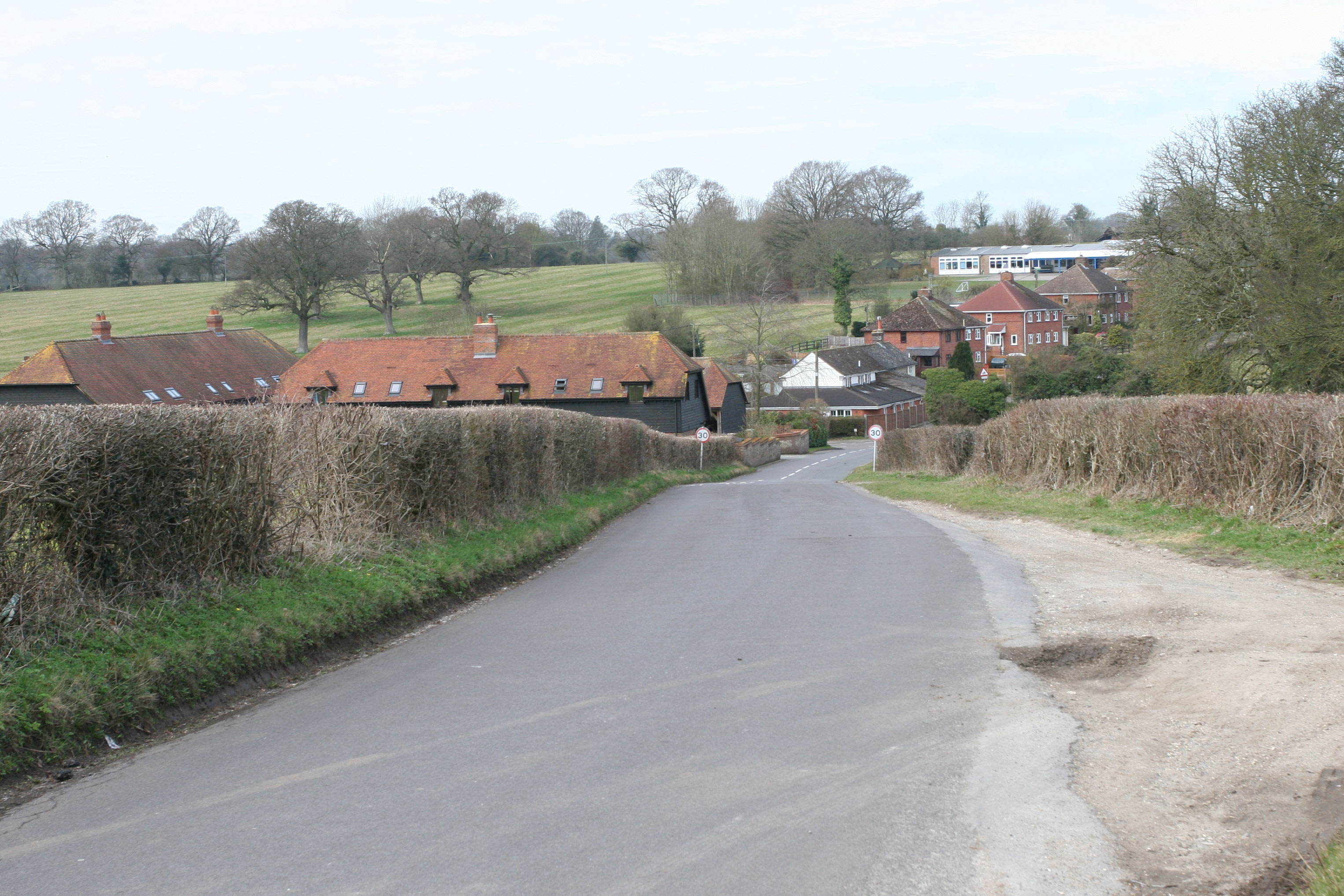
- Ragged Appleshaw

- Location within Hampshire
- OS grid reference: SU3081748644
- Civil parish: Appleshaw
- District: Test Valley
- Shire county: Hampshire
- Region: South East
- Country: England
- Sovereign state: United Kingdom
- Post town: ANDOVER
- Postcode district: SP11
- Dialling code: 01264
- Police: Hampshire and Isle of Wight
- Fire: Hampshire and Isle of Wight
- Ambulance: South Central
- UK Parliament: North West Hampshire

Ragged Appleshaw is a hamlet in the civil parish of Appleshaw in the Test Valley district of Hampshire, England. Its nearest town is Andover, which lies approximately 4.2 miles (6.7 km) south-east from the hamlet.
