= Ramsnest Common =

Hamlet in Surrey, England

Coordinates: 51.0930°N 0.6520°W

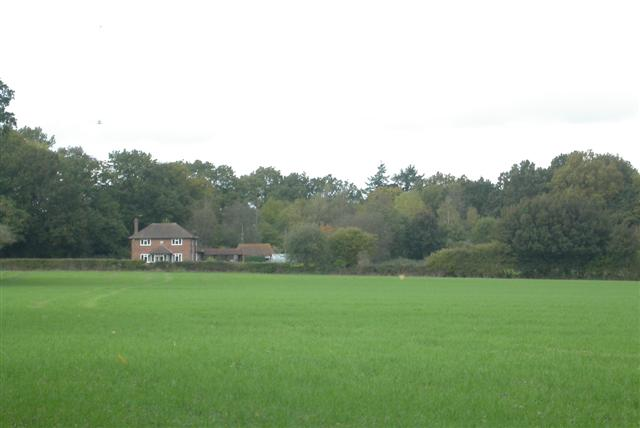
- Farm house with grass meadow and woodland at Ramsnest Common

- Location within Surrey
- Population: 354 (2011 UK Census in a sparsely populated Output Area which includes Ansteadbrook)
- OS grid reference: SU945335
- Civil parish: Chiddingfold
- District: Waverley
- Shire county: Surrey
- Region: South East
- Country: England
- Sovereign state: United Kingdom
- Post town: Godalming
- Postcode district: GU8
- Dialling code: 01428
- Police: Surrey
- Fire: Surrey
- Ambulance: South East Coast
- UK Parliament: Godalming and Ash

Ramsnest Common is a hamlet in the far south of the Borough of Waverley, the largest district of Surrey, England centred on the A283 1.5 miles (2.4 km) SSW of Chiddingfold village centre between Milford and Petworth in West Sussex which it borders. The area of overwhelmingly rural land, most of which is scattered forest, in particular Killinghurst Great Copse, had no medieval settlement.

== History ==
The name Ramsnest or Ram's nest in modern orthography refers to the curly horns that are found on a ram. Ramsnest Common is part of the civil and ecclesiastical parishes of Chiddingfold which is most dense to the north where it has a prominent village green, pubs, school and church. It is currently in the electoral ward 'Chiddingfold and Dunsfold' and with Ansteadbrook and uninhabited Killinghurst Great Copse forms Census Output Area E00157394. The land to all sides of the linear settlement forms a predominantly ancient woodland part of the scattered forest of The Weald, describing not just the hamlet but also the informal common land in the south of the parish, which lacking medieval claims to formally being villagers' common or part of a manor; the area was described as almost impenetrable and so subdivided and settled late by the villagers of Chiddingfold. By 1911 Ramsnest Common had a small Strict/Particular Baptist church/chapel (the latter term is used to describe all non-Catholic churches by staunch Anglicans or Catholics).

== Today ==
Ramsnest Common in built environment comprises cottages and houses, some larger country homes, a petrol station called The Broken Spur (with a small store for general provisions), a mechanics workshop, some farms and a pub called The Mulberry Inn (previously The Ramsnest Inn) owned by celebrity restaurateur Chris Evans (presenter). There are bus stops nearby which go to Haslemere and Godalming.
