= Ramsden, Worcestershire =

Hamlet in Worcestershire, England

Coordinates: 52°06′55″N 02°06′50″W

Elizabeth II postbox on Rebecca Road, Ramsden

Ramsden is a hamlet on the boundary between Besford and Drakes Broughton and Wadborough civil parishes, in Wychavon district in the English county of Worcestershire.

Ramsden is located due west of the town of Pershore. It lies on the Regional Cycle Route 46, connecting Pershore and Worcester.
