= Radford, Worcestershire =

Hamlet in Worcestershire, England

Coordinates: 52.193°N 1.989°W

Radford is a hamlet in the Wychavon district of Worcestershire, England. It is 1 mile SSW of Inkberrow. In 2013, Landscan population maps show there to be as little as 21 people living in Radford. In 1870-72 it had a population of 80.

== Climate ==
Like much of the British isles, Radford has a temperate maritime climate. Maximums range from 7.6 °C (45.7 °F) in January to 22.4 °C (72.3 °F) in July and minimums from 1.0 °C (33.8 °F) in February to 12.2 °C (54.0 °F) in July. On 12 December 1981, the lowest reading of −22.0 °C (−7.6 °F) was recorded. The warmest temperature ever recorded was 35.6 °C (96.1 °F) on 3 August 1990.

Climate data for Radford (1981–2010) (extremes 1994–present)
Month	Jan	Feb	Mar	Apr	May	Jun	Jul	Aug	Sep	Oct	Nov	Dec	Year
Record high °C (°F)	16.1 (61.0)	18.1 (64.6)	21.0 (69.8)	26.0 (78.8)	28.4 (83.1)	34.0 (93.2)	34.0 (93.2)	35.6 (96.1)	28.8 (83.8)	28.4 (83.1)	18.6 (65.5)	18.0 (64.4)	35.6 (96.1)
Mean daily maximum °C (°F)	7.6 (45.7)	8.0 (46.4)	10.9 (51.6)	13.6 (56.5)	17.0 (62.6)	20.0 (68.0)	22.4 (72.3)	22.0 (71.6)	19.0 (66.2)	14.7 (58.5)	10.5 (50.9)	7.7 (45.9)	14.4 (58.0)
Daily mean °C (°F)	4.5 (40.1)	4.5 (40.1)	6.8 (44.2)	8.9 (48.0)	12.1 (53.8)	15.0 (59.0)	17.3 (63.1)	16.9 (62.4)	14.4 (57.9)	10.9 (51.6)	7.1 (44.8)	4.7 (40.5)	10.3 (50.5)
Mean daily minimum °C (°F)	1.4 (34.5)	1.0 (33.8)	2.7 (36.9)	4.1 (39.4)	7.1 (44.8)	9.9 (49.8)	12.2 (54.0)	11.8 (53.2)	9.8 (49.6)	7.0 (44.6)	3.7 (38.7)	1.6 (34.9)	6.0 (42.9)
Record low °C (°F)	−19.4 (−2.9)	−12.7 (9.1)	−9.4 (15.1)	−7.3 (18.9)	−2.5 (27.5)	−1.0 (30.2)	2.7 (36.9)	0.0 (32.0)	−1.0 (30.2)	−5.1 (22.8)	−10.5 (13.1)	−22.0 (−7.6)	−22.0 (−7.6)
Average rainfall mm (inches)	53.0 (2.09)	35.6 (1.40)	39.2 (1.54)	47.7 (1.88)	53.0 (2.09)	50.4 (1.98)	50.2 (1.98)	55.1 (2.17)	52.2 (2.06)	60.1 (2.37)	56.6 (2.23)	53.3 (2.10)	606.4 (23.89)
Average rainy days (≥ 1.0 mm)	11.3	8.9	9.3	9.6	9.0	8.3	8.0	8.5	8.9	10.9	10.9	10.6	114.2
Average relative humidity (%)	84.0	82.0	77.0	73.0	72.0	72.0	71.0	71.0	75.0	80.0	85.0	86.0	77.3
Mean monthly sunshine hours	56.4	72.4	111.5	155.8	194.1	195.9	205.1	189.9	140.7	104.6	64.8	45.7	1,536.9
Source 1: Met Office
Source 2: Voodoo Skies
