= Ratho Station =

Community in Edinburgh, Scotland

Coordinates: 55°56′11″N 3°23′16″W

Ratho Station: Scottish Gaelic: Stèisean Ràthach
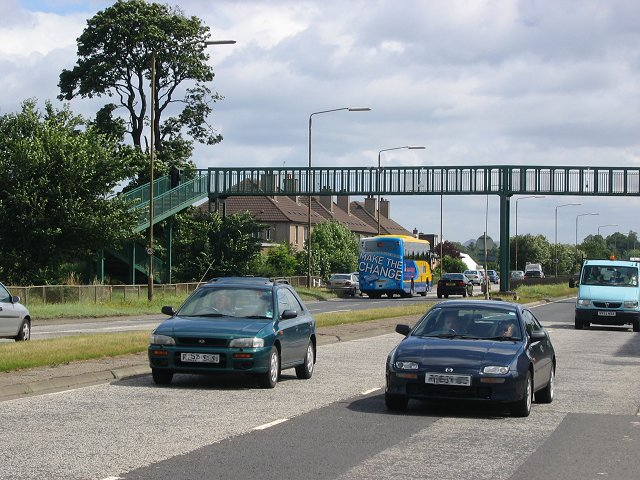
- Council area: Edinburgh
- Country: Scotland
- Sovereign state: United Kingdom
- Post town: EDINBURGH
- Postcode district: EH
- Dialling code: 0131
- Police: Scotland
- Fire: Scottish
- Ambulance: Scottish
- UK Parliament: Edinburgh West
- Scottish Parliament: Edinburgh North Western

Ratho Station is a commuter village of Edinburgh, the capital of Scotland, located in Edinburgh council area. It is located south of Edinburgh Airport; the community has a population of approximately 600. About 300 houses are within the village limit.

The name derives from the closed railway station of the same name (itself named after the nearby village of Ratho), which in 1917 was the site of a rail crash which killed 12 people.

== Amenities ==
The local primary school is Hillwood Primary School, which replaced the now closed Newbridge Primary School in 1975. Catchment areas include Ratho Station, Newbridge, Gogar and Ingliston. The village is served by one primary shop, Scotmid or Co-op Foodhall as it was called when first opened. When first created Ratho Station also had its own post office and police station. Both have now closed, with Ratho being the location for the nearest post office.

== Employment ==
A large amount of warehousing and light industry is located along the Queen Anne Drive, with notable businesses such as the BenRiach Distillery Company's Newbridge Bond. The village lies under the flight path of planes very close to Edinburgh Airport and there is a strict height restriction on building. Two modern office buildings on the main road to the south-west do, however, stretch this height restriction to its limit.
