= Raddery =

Coordinates: 57.603°N 4.15904°W

Raddery: Scottish Gaelic: Radharaidh
- Location within the Highland council area
- OS grid reference: NH710590
- Council area: Highland
- Country: Scotland
- Sovereign state: United Kingdom
- Post town: Fortrose
- Postcode district: IV10 8
- Police: Scotland
- Fire: Scottish
- Ambulance: Scottish

Raddery (Scottish Gaelic: Radharaidh) is a small village, which is located with the former estate of Raddery House, in the Black Isle in Ross-shire, Scottish Highlands and is in the Scottish council area of Highland.
