= A Shooting Party at Ranton Abbey =

1839 painting by Francis Grant

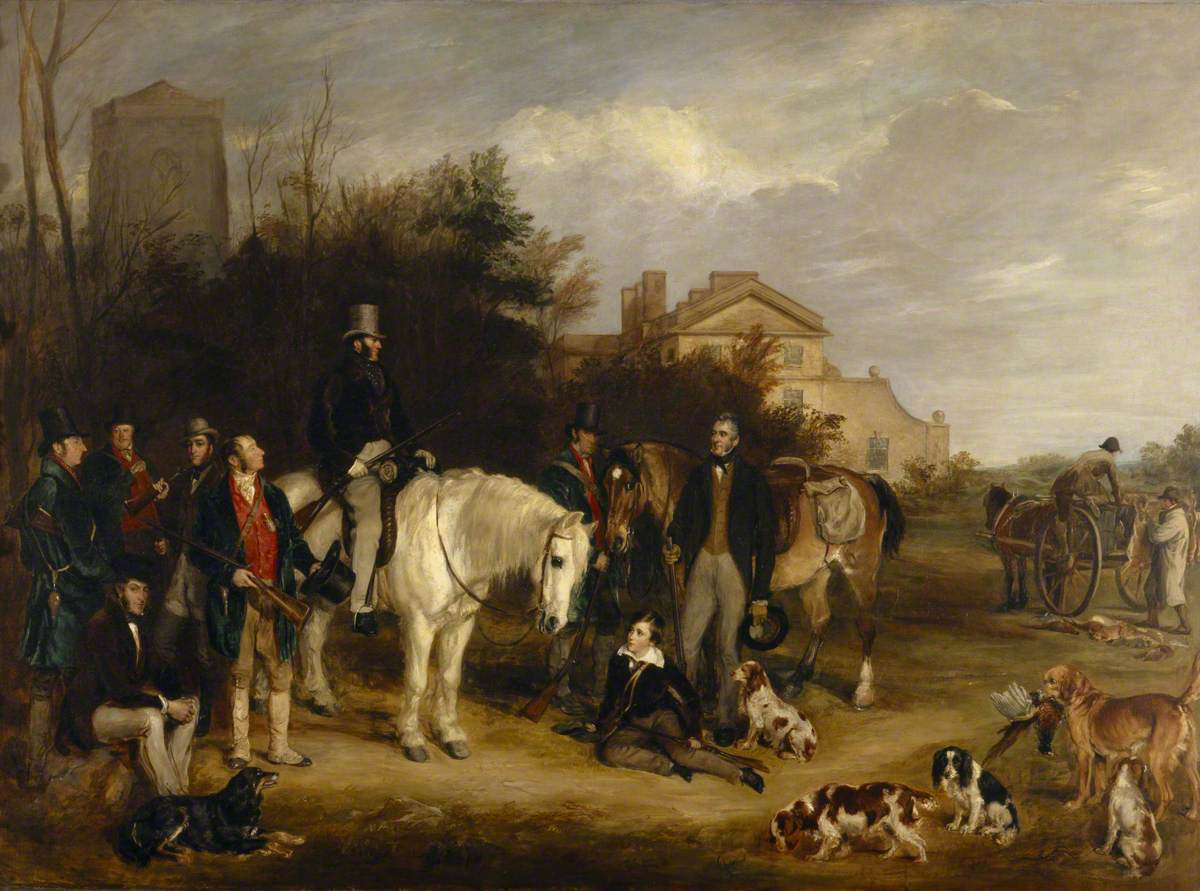
- Artist: Francis Grant
- Year: 1839
- Type: Oil on canvas, portrait painting
- Dimensions: 146 cm × 201.9 cm (57 in × 79.5 in)
- Location: Shugborough Hall, Staffordshire

A Shooting Party at Ranton Abbey is an 1839 oil painting by the British artist Francis Grant. A conversation piece, it depicts a scene at Ranton Abbey in Staffordshire. Amongst the group about to take part in a day's shooting are Thomas Anson, 1st Earl of Lichfield, mounted on a white horse, Charles Molyneux, 3rd Earl of Sefton, Henry Paget, Earl of Uxbridge The then Prime Minister Lord Melbourne is shown standing close to centre of the painting near the future 2nd Earl of Lichfield, who is sitting on the ground, and the gamekeeper James Gee. Queen Victoria noted in her diary in November 1838 that Melbourne was posing for Grant to capture his likeness.

It was commissioned by the Earl of Lichfield who owned Ranton Abbey. Grant developed an reputation for producing hunting scenes in the 1830s, but subsequently became best-known for his fashionable portrait paintings. He was elected as President of the Royal Academy in 1866. The work is now in the collection of Shugborough Hall in Staffordshire. The painting was accepted in lieu by the government in 1966 and control formally given to the National Trust in 1984.

== Bibliography ==
- Foss, Valerie. Golden Retrievers Today. Howell Book House, 1994.
- Ormond, Richard. Early Victorian Portraits, National Portrait Gallery, 1974.
- Wills, Catherine. High Society: The Life and Art of Sir Francis Grant, 1803–1878. National Galleries of Scotland, 2003.
