= Dalmeny railway station =

Railway station in Edinburgh, Scotland

Dalmeny Scottish Gaelic: Dùn Mheinidh
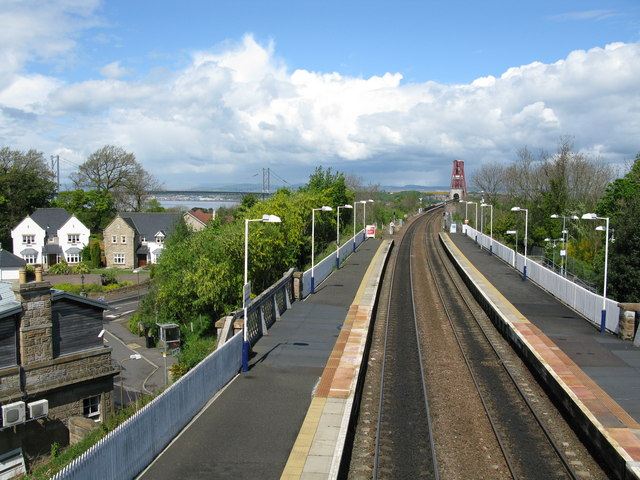
- Dalmeny railway station in 2009, tracks towards the Forth Bridge visible behind its entry arch, the Forth Road Bridge is to the left.

General information
- Location: Dalmeny, Edinburgh; Scotland
- Coordinates: 55.9862°N 3.3815°W
- Grid reference: NT139778
- Managed by: ScotRail
- Platforms: 2

Other information
- Station code: DAM

History
- Original company: Edinburgh and Glasgow Railway original station North British Railway current station
- Pre-grouping: North British Railway
- Post-grouping: London and North Eastern Railway

Key dates
- 1 March 1866: Original station opened by E&GR
- 5 March 1890: E&G station closed
- 28 April 1890: NBR Forth Bridge station opened

Passengers
- 2020/21: ▼88,890
- 2021/22: ▲0.270 million
- 2022/23: ▲0.342 million
- 2023/24: ▲0.441 million
- 2024/25: ▲0.489 million
Location
Notes
- Passenger statistics from the Office of Rail and Road

Dalmeny railway station is a railway station serving the towns of Dalmeny and South Queensferry, about 8 miles (13 km) west of Edinburgh city centre. It is on the Fife Circle Line, located just south of the Forth Bridge.

== History ==
The current station is the second to serve the town. The first station was on the Port Edgar branch of the Edinburgh and Glasgow Railway which opened on 1 March 1866. The North British Railway closed the original station on 5 March 1890 to be replaced by the existing station at the same time as the opening of the Forth Bridge.

== Services ==
The majority of trains calling at the station (4 per hour each way Mon-Sat, 2 per hour on Sundays) are part of the Fife Circle Line services, however there is a daily service between Glasgow Queen Street and Kirkcaldy that calls here and uses the line to Winchburgh Junction. (This service was withdrawn in 2020, but was reinstated in the December 2025 timetable) The winter 2010/11 timetable extended the majority of the Fife Circle Line services to Newcraighall (at the south east end of the Edinburgh Crossrail), but since September 2015, only a few do so (working to/from Tweedbank at peak periods).

Preceding station	National Rail	Following station
Edinburgh Gateway or South Gyle	ScotRail; Fife Circle Line	North Queensferry
Linlithgow	ScotRail; Glasgow to Edinburgh via Falkirk Line	North Queensferry
	Historical railways	
Turnhouse; Line open, station closed	North British Railway; Forth Bridge connecting lines	North Queensferry; Line and station open
Philipstoun; Line open, station closed	North British Railway; Forth Bridge connecting lines	North Queensferry; Line and station open
	Disused railways	
Kirkliston; Line and station closed	North British Railway; South Queensferry Branch from the 1866-1890 station only	South Queensferry; Line and station closed

== Electrification ==
£55 million is being spent to electrify 104 km (65 mi) of Fife Circle track, between Haymarket and Dalmeny, for use by battery electric multiple units, was begun by Scottish Powerlines in June 2022 and was due to be completed by December 2024. However as of April 2026, the new completion date was March 2027.
