= Raginnis =

Coordinates: 50.077°N 5.546°W

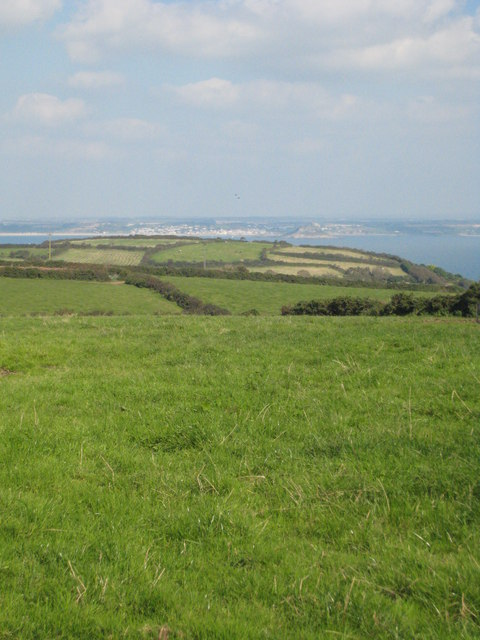
- A field at Raginnis

- Location within Cornwall
- OS grid reference: SW464257
- Unitary authority: Cornwall
- Ceremonial county: Cornwall
- Region: South West
- Country: England
- Sovereign state: United Kingdom

Raginnis is a hamlet near Mousehole in west Cornwall, England, United Kingdom.
