= Ellenhall =

Hamlet in Staffordshire, England

Coordinates: 52°50′N 2°14′W

Ellenhall is a small Staffordshire hamlet roughly 2.5 miles south of Eccleshall originally comprising part of the extensive estates of the Earl of Lichfield. The population as taken at the 2011 census was 144. The hamlet consists of a scattered community of cottages and several farms. Ellenhall has no shop, public house or post office. The village school closed in the 1970s and is now a private residence.

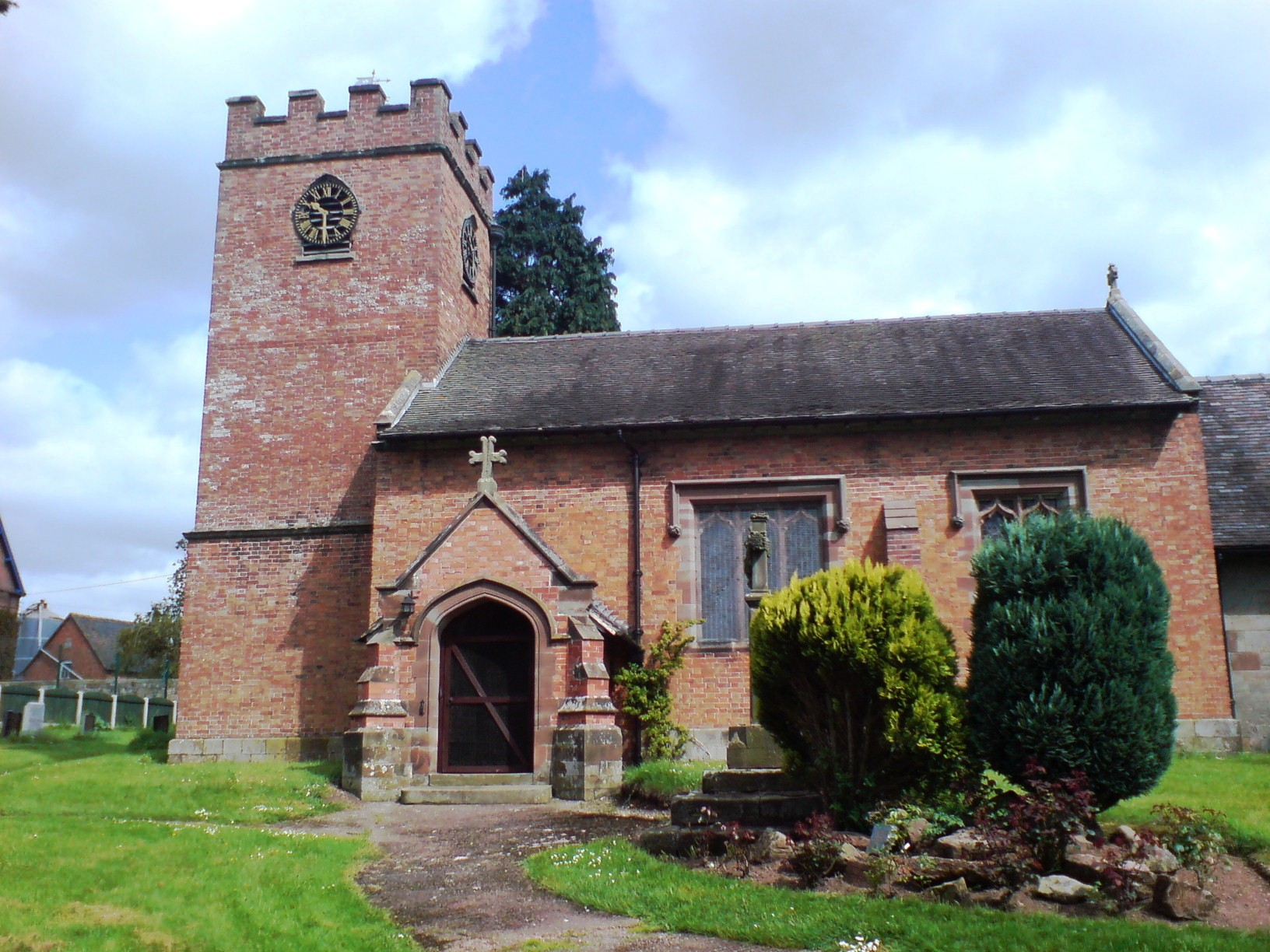
St Mary's church, Ellenhall, May 2008

The church stands on a natural mound close to the highest point at the northern end of the hamlet and is dedicated to St. Mary. The grey sandstone chancel is the oldest part of the church dating from the 12th century, while the red-brick nave and tower represent a 1757 re-build of an earlier structure. The architect for the restoration was Andrew Capper.

The registers of St Mary, Ellenhall, commenced in 1539. The original registers for the period 1599-1903 (Baptisms), 1563-1754 & 1813-1836 (Marriages) & 1539-1964 (Burials) are deposited at Staffordshire Record Office. Bishops Transcripts for the period 1673-1866 (with gaps) are deposited at Lichfield Record Office.

== Notable people ==
- Robert Harcourt (1574 in Ellenhall – 1631) an English explorer, particularly of British Guiana.

== See also ==
- Listed buildings in Ellenhall
