= Ranton, Staffordshire =

Hamlet in Staffordshire, England

Coordinates: 52°49′N 2°12′W

Ranton
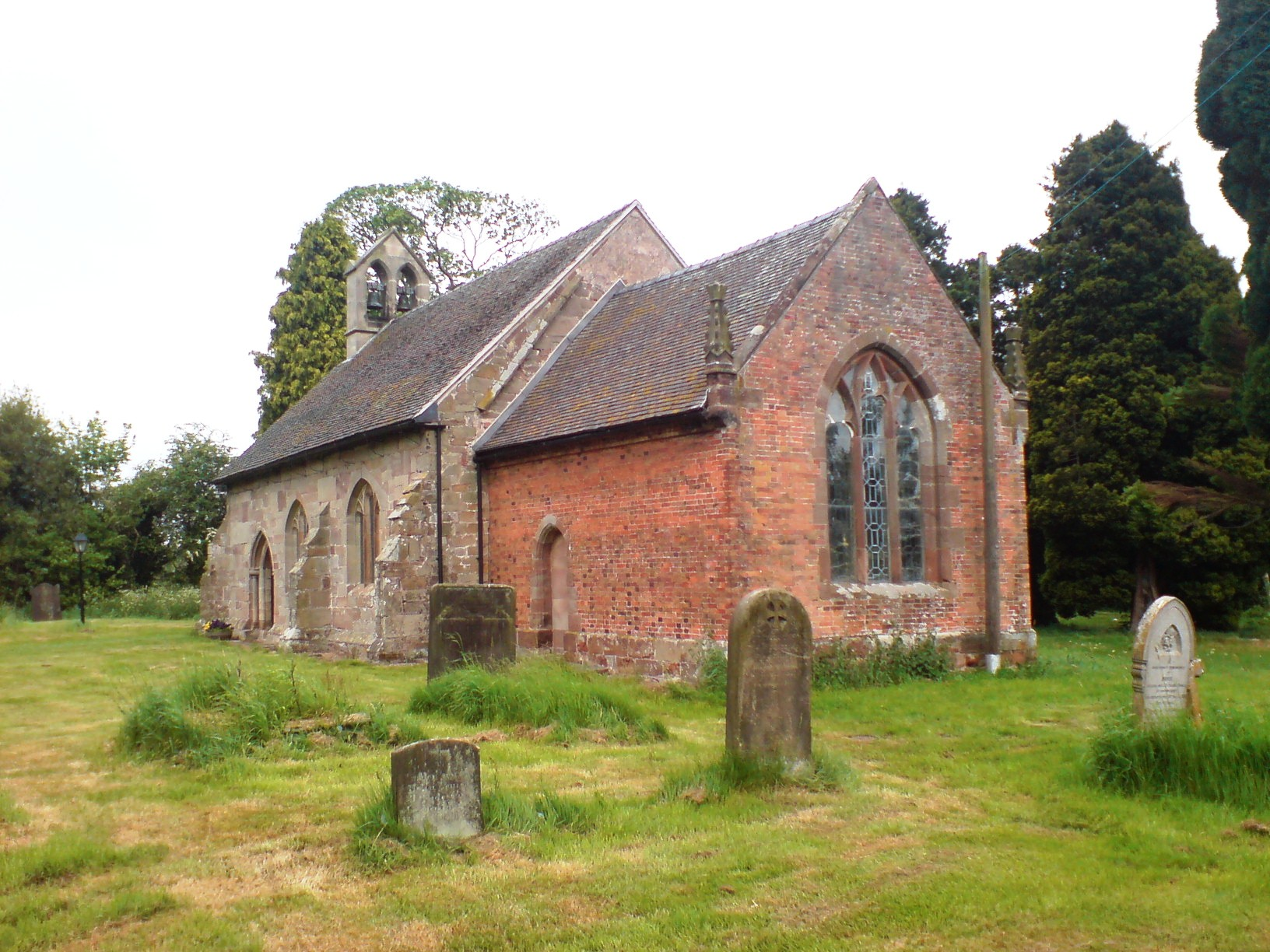
- All Saints’ Church, Ranton

- Location within Staffordshire
- Population: 382 (2011 Census)
- OS grid reference: SJ856242
- Civil parish: Ranton
- District: Stafford
- Shire county: Staffordshire
- Region: West Midlands
- Country: England
- Sovereign state: United Kingdom
- Post town: Stafford
- Postcode district: ST18
- Police: Staffordshire
- Fire: Staffordshire
- Ambulance: West Midlands
- UK Parliament: Stafford

Ranton is a hamlet and civil parish in Staffordshire, England, situated 3.5 miles (5.6 km) west of Stafford, 2.5 miles (4.0 km) east of Woodseaves and 2 miles (3.2 km) northeast of Gnosall. The population taken at the 2011 census was 382. As of 2013, both public houses that once operated in Ranton were bought and subsequently removed from operation. Due to this, Ranton is now listed as a hamlet.

== History ==
Ranton is listed under the Pirehill Hundred section of the Domesday Book of 1086. There is debate as to how the name Ranton was spelt prior to the 18th century, possibilities include 'Ronton', 'Rantone' (as named in the Domesday Book) and 'Rantun' (rarely used).

== All Saints’ Church, Ranton ==
All Saints’ Church, Ranton, is a small ancient structure, dating from the 13th century.

The building was renovated in 1753, when the chancel was built. The east window was probably put in at this time. The bell turret was removed in 1889, but was re-erected in the 1940s in memory of Frank Russell and John Owen Timms, two local men who lost their lives in the Second World War. The new turret was not strong enough to support the bells, which had to be removed and put onto storage until the turret was rebuilt. The church has a small bell-tower at the west end of the nave with two bells, and was repaired and a gallery erected in 1840. The restoration was supervised by Staffordshire ecclesiastical architect Andrew Capper. The parish registers commence in 1655. The original registers for the period 1655-1993 (Baptisms), 1655-1984 (Marriages) & 1655-1993 (Burials) are deposited at Staffordshire Record Office. Bishops’ Transcripts, 1660-1868 (with gaps 1840–1854) are deposited at Lichfield Record office.

The ruins of both Ranton Abbey and Abbey House stand nearby.

== See also ==
- Listed buildings in Ranton, Staffordshire
- Ranton Green
