= List of peers 1707–1719 =

This page lists all peers who held extant titles between 1707 and 1719.

== Peerage of England, Scotland and Great Britain ==
=== Dukes ===
Title	Holder	Date gained	Date lost	Notes
Peerage of England
Duke of Cornwall (1337)	none	1702	1714	
Duke of Cornwall (1337)	Prince George, Prince of Wales	1714	1727	
Duke of Norfolk (1483)	Thomas Howard, 8th Duke of Norfolk	1701	1732	
Duke of Somerset (1547)	Charles Seymour, 6th Duke of Somerset	1678	1748	
Duke of Cleveland (1670)	Barbara Palmer, 1st Duchess of Cleveland	1670	1709	Died
Duke of Cleveland (1670)	Charles FitzRoy, 2nd Duke of Cleveland	1709	1730	
Duke of Portsmouth (1673)	Louise de Kérouaille, Duchess of Portsmouth	1673	1734	
Duke of Richmond (1675)	Charles Lennox, 1st Duke of Richmond	1675	1723	
Duke of Southampton (1675)	Charles Fitzroy, 1st Duke of Southampton	1675	1730	Succeeded to the more senior Dukedom of Cleveland, see above
Duke of Grafton (1675)	Charles FitzRoy, 2nd Duke of Grafton	1690	1757	
Duke of Ormonde (1682)	James Butler, 2nd Duke of Ormonde	1688	1715	Attainted and his honours were forfeited; the attainder was reversed in 1871
Duke of Beaufort (1682)	Henry Somerset, 2nd Duke of Beaufort	1700	1714	Died
Duke of Beaufort (1682)	Henry Scudamore, 3rd Duke of Beaufort	1714	1745	
Duke of Northumberland (1683)	George FitzRoy, 1st Duke of Northumberland	1683	1716	Died, title extinct
Duke of St Albans (1684)	Charles Beauclerk, 1st Duke of St Albans	1684	1726	
Duke of Cumberland (1689)	Prince George, Duke of Cumberland	1689	1708	Died, title extinct
Duke of Bolton (1689)	Charles Paulet, 2nd Duke of Bolton	1699	1722	
Duke of Schomberg (1689)	Meinhardt Schomberg, 3rd Duke of Schomberg	1693	1719	Died, title extinct
Duke of Shrewsbury (1694)	Charles Talbot, 1st Duke of Shrewsbury	1694	1718	Died, title extinct
Duke of Leeds (1694)	Thomas Osborne, 1st Duke of Leeds	1694	1712	Died
Duke of Leeds (1694)	Peregrine Osborne, 2nd Duke of Leeds	1712	1729	
Duke of Bedford (1694)	Wriothesley Russell, 2nd Duke of Bedford	1700	1711	Died
Duke of Bedford (1694)	Wriothesley Russell, 3rd Duke of Bedford	1711	1732	
Duke of Devonshire (1694)	William Cavendish, 1st Duke of Devonshire	1694	1707	Died
Duke of Devonshire (1694)	William Cavendish, 2nd Duke of Devonshire	1707	1729	
Duke of Newcastle-upon-Tyne (1694)	John Holles, 1st Duke of Newcastle-upon-Tyne	1694	1711	Died, title extinct
Duke of Marlborough (1702)	John Churchill, 1st Duke of Marlborough	1702	1722	
Duke of Buckingham and Normanby (1703)	John Sheffield, 1st Duke of Buckingham and Normanby	1703	1721	
Duke of Rutland (1703)	John Manners, 1st Duke of Rutland	1703	1711	Died
Duke of Rutland (1703)	John Manners, 2nd Duke of Rutland	1711	1721	
Duke of Montagu (1705)	Ralph Montagu, 1st Duke of Montagu	1705	1709	Died
Duke of Montagu (1705)	John Montagu, 2nd Duke of Montagu	1709	1749	
Duke of Cambridge (1706)	Prince George, Duke of Cambridge	1706	1727	Became Duke of Cornwall, see above
Peerage of Scotland
Duke of Hamilton (1643)	James Hamilton, 4th Duke of Hamilton	1698	1712	Created Duke of Brandon in 1710; died
Duke of Hamilton (1643)	James Hamilton, 5th Duke of Hamilton	1712	1743	
Duke of Buccleuch (1663)	Anne Scott, 1st Duchess of Buccleuch	1663	1732	
Duke of Queensberry (1684)	James Douglas, 2nd Duke of Queensberry	1695	1711	Created Duke of Dover in 1708; died
Duke of Queensberry (1684)	Charles Douglas, 3rd Duke of Queensberry	1711	1778	
Duke of Gordon (1684)	George Gordon, 1st Duke of Gordon	1684	1716	Died
Duke of Gordon (1684)	Alexander Gordon, 2nd Duke of Gordon	1716	1728	
Duke of Argyll (1701)	John Campbell, 2nd Duke of Argyll	1703	1743	Created Duke of Greenwich in 1719
Duke of Atholl (1703)	John Murray, 1st Duke of Atholl	1703	1724	
Duke of Douglas (1703)	Archibald Douglas, 1st Duke of Douglas	1703	1761	
Duke of Montrose (1707)	James Graham, 1st Duke of Montrose	1707	1742	
Duke of Roxburghe (1707)	John Ker, 1st Duke of Roxburghe	1707	1741	
Peerage of Great Britain
Duke of Kent (1710)	Henry Grey, 1st Duke of Kent	1710	1740	New creation
Duke of Ancaster and Kesteven (1715)	Robert Bertie, 1st Duke of Ancaster and Kesteven	1715	1723	New creation
Duke of Kingston-upon-Hull (1715)	Evelyn Pierrepont, 1st Duke of Kingston-upon-Hull	1715	1726	New creation
Duke of Newcastle upon Tyne (1715)	Thomas Pelham-Holles, 1st Duke of Newcastle	1715	1768	New creation
Duke of York and Albany (1716)	Ernest Augustus, Duke of York and Albany	1716	1728	New creation
Duke of Portland (1716)	Henry Bentinck, 1st Duke of Portland	1716	1726	New creation
Duke of Wharton (1716)	Philip Wharton, 1st Duke of Wharton	1718	1729	New creation
Duchess of Kendal (1719)	Melusine von der Schulenburg, Duchess of Kendal	1719	1743	New creation
Duke of Manchester (1719)	Charles Montagu, 1st Duke of Manchester	1719	1722	New creation
Duke of Chandos (1719)	James Brydges, 1st Duke of Chandos	1719	1744	New creation

=== Marquesses ===
Title	Holder	Date gained	Date lost	Notes
Peerage of England
Marquess of Powis (1687)	William Herbert, 2nd Marquess of Powis	1696	1745	
Marquess of Kent (1706)	Henry Grey, 1st Marquess of Kent	1706	1740	Created Duke of Kent, see above
Marquess of Lindsey (1706)	Robert Bertie, 1st Marquess of Lindsey	1706	1723	Created Duke of Ancaster and Kesteven, see above
Marquess of Dorchester (1706)	Evelyn Pierrepont, 1st Marquess of Dorchester	1706	1726	Created Duke of Kingston-upon-Hull, see above
Peerage of Scotland
Marquess of Tweeddale (1694)	John Hay, 2nd Marquess of Tweeddale	1697	1713	Died
Marquess of Tweeddale (1694)	Charles Hay, 3rd Marquess of Tweeddale	1713	1715	Died
Marquess of Tweeddale (1694)	John Hay, 4th Marquess of Tweeddale	1715	1762	
Marquess of Lothian (1701)	William Kerr, 2nd Marquess of Lothian	1703	1722	
Marquess of Annandale (1701)	William Johnstone, 1st Marquess of Annandale	1701	1721	
Peerage of Great Britain
Marquess of Wharton (1715)	Thomas Wharton, 1st Marquess of Wharton	1715	1715	New creation, died
Marquess of Wharton (1715)	Philip Wharton, 2nd Marquess of Wharton	1715	1729	Created Duke of Wharton, see above

=== Earls ===
Title	Holder	Date gained	Date lost	Notes
Peerage of England
Earl of Shrewsbury (1442)	Gilbert Talbot, 13th Earl of Shrewsbury	1718	1743	Earldom previously held by the Duke of Shrewsbury
Earl of Derby (1485)	James Stanley, 10th Earl of Derby	1702	1736	
Earl of Huntingdon (1529)	Theophilus Hastings, 9th Earl of Huntingdon	1705	1746	
Earl of Pembroke (1551)	Thomas Herbert, 8th Earl of Pembroke	1683	1733	
Earl of Devon (1553)	William Courtenay, de jure 6th Earl of Devon	1702	1735	
Earl of Lincoln (1572)	Henry Clinton, 7th Earl of Lincoln	1693	1728	
Earl of Suffolk (1603)	Henry Howard, 5th Earl of Suffolk	1691	1709	Died
Earl of Suffolk (1603)	Henry Howard, 6th Earl of Suffolk	1709	1718	Died
Earl of Suffolk (1603)	Charles Howard, 7th Earl of Suffolk	1718	1722	
Earl of Dorset (1604)	Lionel Sackville, 7th Earl of Dorset	1706	1765	
Earl of Exeter (1605)	John Cecil, 6th Earl of Exeter	1700	1721	
Earl of Salisbury (1605)	James Cecil, 5th Earl of Salisbury	1694	1728	
Earl of Bridgewater (1617)	Scroop Egerton, 4th Earl of Bridgewater	1701	1744	
Earl of Northampton (1618)	George Compton, 4th Earl of Northampton	1681	1727	
Earl of Leicester (1618)	John Sidney, 6th Earl of Leicester	1705	1737	
Earl of Warwick (1618)	Edward Rich, 7th Earl of Warwick	1702	1721	
Earl of Denbigh (1622)	Basil Feilding, 4th Earl of Denbigh	1685	1717	Died
Earl of Denbigh (1622)	William Feilding, 5th Earl of Denbigh	1717	1755	
Earl of Bolingbroke (1624)	Paulet St John, 3rd Earl of Bolingbroke	1688	1711	Died, title extinct
Earl of Westmorland (1624)	Thomas Fane, 6th Earl of Westmorland	1699	1736	
Earl of Manchester (1626)	Charles Montagu, 4th Earl of Manchester	1683	1722	Created Duke of Manchester, see above
Earl of Berkshire (1626)	Henry Howard, 4th Earl of Berkshire	1706	1757	
Earl Rivers (1626)	Richard Savage, 4th Earl Rivers	1694	1712	Died
Earl Rivers (1626)	John Savage, 5th Earl Rivers	1712	1737	
Earl of Peterborough (1628)	Charles Mordaunt, 3rd Earl of Peterborough	1697	1735	
Earl of Stamford (1628)	Thomas Grey, 2nd Earl of Stamford	1673	1720	
Earl of Winchilsea (1628)	Charles Finch, 4th Earl of Winchilsea	1689	1712	Died
Earl of Winchilsea (1628)	Heneage Finch, 5th Earl of Winchilsea	1712	1726	
Earl of Carnarvon (1628)	Charles Dormer, 2nd Earl of Carnarvon	1643	1709	Died, title extinct
Earl of Chesterfield (1628)	Philip Stanhope, 2nd Earl of Chesterfield	1656	1714	Died
Earl of Chesterfield (1628)	Philip Stanhope, 3rd Earl of Chesterfield	1714	1726	
Earl of Thanet (1628)	Thomas Tufton, 6th Earl of Thanet	1684	1729	
Earl of Sunderland (1643)	Charles Spencer, 3rd Earl of Sunderland	1702	1722	
Earl of Scarsdale (1645)	Robert Leke, 3rd Earl of Scarsdale	1681	1707	Died
Earl of Scarsdale (1645)	Nicholas Leke, 4th Earl of Scarsdale	1707	1736	
Earl of Sandwich (1660)	Edward Montagu, 3rd Earl of Sandwich	1688	1729	
Earl of Anglesey (1661)	John Annesley, 4th Earl of Anglesey	1702	1710	Died
Earl of Anglesey (1661)	Arthur Annesley, 5th Earl of Anglesey	1710	1737	
Earl of Bath (1661)	William Granville, 3rd Earl of Bath	1701	1711	Died, title extinct
Earl of Cardigan (1661)	George Brudenell, 3rd Earl of Cardigan	1703	1732	
Earl of Clarendon (1661)	Henry Hyde, 2nd Earl of Clarendon	1674	1709	Died
Earl of Clarendon (1661)	Edward Hyde, 3rd Earl of Clarendon	1709	1723	
Earl of Essex (1661)	Algernon Capell, 2nd Earl of Essex	1683	1710	Died
Earl of Essex (1661)	William Capell, 3rd Earl of Essex	1710	1743	
Earl of Carlisle (1661)	Charles Howard, 3rd Earl of Carlisle	1692	1738	
Earl of Ailesbury (1664)	Thomas Bruce, 2nd Earl of Ailesbury	1685	1741	
Earl of Burlington (1664)	Richard Boyle, 3rd Earl of Burlington	1704	1753	Earl of Cork in the Peerage of Ireland
Earl of Arlington (1672)	Isabella Fitzroy, 2nd Countess of Arlington	1685	1723	
Earl of Shaftesbury (1672)	Anthony Ashley-Cooper, 3rd Earl of Shaftesbury	1699	1713	Died
Earl of Shaftesbury (1672)	Anthony Ashley Cooper, 4th Earl of Shaftesbury	1713	1771	
Earl of Lichfield (1674)	Edward Lee, 1st Earl of Lichfield	1674	1716	Died
Earl of Lichfield (1674)	George Lee, 2nd Earl of Lichfield	1716	1742	
Earl of Sussex (1674)	Thomas Lennard, 1st Earl of Sussex	1674	1715	Died, title extinct
Earl of Feversham (1676)	Louis de Duras, 2nd Earl of Feversham	1677	1709	Died, title extinct
Earl of Radnor (1679)	Charles Robartes, 2nd Earl of Radnor	1685	1723	
Earl of Yarmouth (1679)	William Paston, 2nd Earl of Yarmouth	1683	1732	
Earl of Berkeley (1679)	Charles Berkeley, 2nd Earl of Berkeley	1698	1710	Died
Earl of Berkeley (1679)	James Berkeley, 3rd Earl of Berkeley	1710	1736	
Earl of Nottingham (1681)	Daniel Finch, 2nd Earl of Nottingham	1682	1730	
Earl of Rochester (1682)	Laurence Hyde, 1st Earl of Rochester	1682	1711	Died
Earl of Rochester (1682)	Henry Hyde, 2nd Earl of Rochester	1711	1753	
Earl of Abingdon (1682)	Montagu Venables-Bertie, 2nd Earl of Abingdon	1699	1743	
Earl of Gainsborough (1682)	Baptist Noel, 3rd Earl of Gainsborough	1690	1714	Died
Earl of Gainsborough (1682)	Baptist Noel, 4th Earl of Gainsborough	1714	1751	
Earl of Plymouth (1682)	Other Windsor, 2nd Earl of Plymouth	1687	1727	
Earl of Holderness (1682)	Robert Darcy, 3rd Earl of Holderness	1692	1721	
Earl of Dorchester (1686)	Catherine Sedley, Countess of Dorchester	1686	1717	Died, title extinct
Earl of Derwentwater (1688)	James Radclyffe, 3rd Earl of Derwentwater	1705	1716	Title forfeit
Earl of Stafford (1688)	Henry Stafford Howard, 1st Earl of Stafford	1688	1719	Died
Earl of Stafford (1688)	William Stafford-Howard, 2nd Earl of Stafford	1719	1734	
Earl of Portland (1689)	William Bentinck, 1st Earl of Portland	1689	1709	Died
Earl of Portland (1689)	Henry Bentinck, 2nd Earl of Portland	1709	1726	Created Duke of Portland, see above
Earl of Torrington (1689)	Arthur Herbert, 1st Earl of Torrington	1689	1716	Died, title extinct
Earl of Warrington (1690)	George Booth, 2nd Earl of Warrington	1694	1758	
Earl of Scarbrough (1690)	Richard Lumley, 1st Earl of Scarbrough	1690	1721	
Earl of Bradford (1694)	Francis Newport, 1st Earl of Bradford	1694	1708	Died
Earl of Bradford (1694)	Richard Newport, 2nd Earl of Bradford	1708	1723	
Earl of Rochford (1695)	William Nassau de Zuylestein, 1st Earl of Rochford	1695	1708	
Earl of Rochford (1695)	William Nassau de Zuylestein, 2nd Earl of Rochford	1709	1710	Died
Earl of Rochford (1695)	Frederick Nassau de Zuylestein, 3rd Earl of Rochford	1710	1738	
Earl of Albemarle (1697)	Arnold van Keppel, 1st Earl of Albemarle	1697	1718	Died
Earl of Albemarle (1697)	Willem van Keppel, 2nd Earl of Albemarle	1718	1754	
Earl of Coventry (1697)	Thomas Coventry, 2nd Earl of Coventry	1699	1710	Died
Earl of Coventry (1697)	Thomas Coventry, 3rd Earl of Coventry	1710	1712	Died
Earl of Coventry (1697)	Gilbert Coventry, 4th Earl of Coventry	1712	1719	Died
Earl of Coventry (1697)	William Coventry, 5th Earl of Coventry	1719	1751	
Earl of Orford (1697)	Edward Russell, 1st Earl of Orford	1697	1727	
Earl of Jersey (1697)	Edward Villiers, 1st Earl of Jersey	1697	1711	Died
Earl of Jersey (1697)	William Villiers, 2nd Earl of Jersey	1711	1721	
Earl of Grantham (1698)	Henry de Nassau d'Auverquerque, 1st Earl of Grantham	1698	1754	
Earl of Wharton (1706)	Thomas Wharton, 1st Earl of Wharton	1706	1715	Created Marquess of Wharton, see above
Earl Poulett (1706)	John Poulett, 1st Earl Poulett	1706	1743	
Earl of Godolphin (1706)	Sidney Godolphin, 1st Earl of Godolphin	1706	1712	Died
Earl of Godolphin (1706)	Francis Godolphin, 2nd Earl of Godolphin	1712	1766	
Earl of Cholmondeley (1706)	Hugh Cholmondeley, 1st Earl of Cholmondeley	1706	1725	
Earl of Bindon (1706)	Henry Howard, 1st Earl of Bindon	1706	1718	Succeeded to the more senior Earldom of Suffolk, see above
Peerage of Scotland
Earl of Crawford (1398)	John Lindsay, 19th Earl of Crawford	1698	1713	Died
Earl of Crawford (1398)	John Lindsay, 20th Earl of Crawford	1713	1749	
Earl of Erroll (1452)	Charles Hay, 13th Earl of Erroll	1704	1717	Died
Earl of Erroll (1452)	Mary Hay, 14th Countess of Erroll	1717	1758	
Earl Marischal (1458)	William Keith, 9th Earl Marischal	1694	1712	Died
Earl Marischal (1458)	George Keith, 10th Earl Marischal	1712	1715	Title forfeited
Earl of Sutherland (1235)	John Gordon, 16th Earl of Sutherland	1703	1733	
Earl of Mar (1114)	John Erskine, Earl of Mar	1689	1716	Attainted
Earl of Rothes (1458)	John Hamilton-Leslie, 9th Earl of Rothes	1700	1722	
Earl of Morton (1458)	James Douglas, 11th Earl of Morton	1686	1715	Died
Earl of Morton (1458)	Robert Douglas, 12th Earl of Morton	1715	1730	
Earl of Glencairn (1488)	William Cunningham, 12th Earl of Glencairn	1703	1734	
Earl of Eglinton (1507)	Alexander Montgomerie, 9th Earl of Eglinton	1701	1729	
Earl of Cassilis (1509)	John Kennedy, 8th Earl of Cassilis	1701	1759	
Earl of Caithness (1455)	Alexander Sinclair, 9th Earl of Caithness	1705	1765	
Earl of Buchan (1469)	David Erskine, 9th Earl of Buchan	1695	1745	
Earl of Moray (1562)	Charles Stuart, 6th Earl of Moray	1701	1735	
Earl of Linlithgow (1600)	James Livingston, 5th Earl of Linlithgow	1695	1716	Attainted
Earl of Winton (1600)	George Seton, 5th Earl of Winton	1704	1716	Peerage forfeited
Earl of Home (1605)	Alexander Home, 7th Earl of Home	1706	1720	
Earl of Perth (1605)	James Drummond, 4th Earl of Perth	1675	1716	Attainted
Earl of Wigtown (1606)	John Fleming, 6th Earl of Wigtown	1681	1744	
Earl of Abercorn (1606)	James Hamilton, 6th Earl of Abercorn	1701	1734	
Earl of Strathmore and Kinghorne (1606)	John Lyon, 4th Earl of Strathmore and Kinghorne	1695	1712	Died
Earl of Strathmore and Kinghorne (1606)	John Lyon, 5th Earl of Strathmore and Kinghorne	1712	1715	Died
Earl of Strathmore and Kinghorne (1606)	Charles Lyon, 6th Earl of Strathmore and Kinghorne	1715	1728	
Earl of Kellie (1619)	Alexander Erskine, 4th Earl of Kellie	1677	1710	Died
Earl of Kellie (1619)	Alexander Erskine, 5th Earl of Kellie	1710	1758	
Earl of Haddington (1619)	Thomas Hamilton, 6th Earl of Haddington	1685	1735	
Earl of Nithsdale (1620)	William Maxwell, 5th Earl of Nithsdale	1696	1716	Attainted
Earl of Galloway (1623)	James Stewart, 5th Earl of Galloway	1694	1746	
Earl of Seaforth (1623)	William Mackenzie, 5th Earl of Seaforth	1701	1716	Title forfeited
Earl of Lauderdale (1624)	John Maitland, 5th Earl of Lauderdale	1695	1710	Died
Earl of Lauderdale (1624)	Charles Maitland, 6th Earl of Lauderdale	1710	1744	
Earl of Loudoun (1633)	Hugh Campbell, 3rd Earl of Loudoun	1684	1731	
Earl of Kinnoull (1633)	William Hay, 6th Earl of Kinnoull	1687	1709	Died
Earl of Kinnoull (1633)	Thomas Hay, 7th Earl of Kinnoull	1709	1719	Died
Earl of Kinnoull (1633)	George Hay, 8th Earl of Kinnoull	1709	1758	
Earl of Dumfries (1633)	Penelope Crichton, 4th Countess of Dumfries	1694	1742	
Earl of Stirling (1633)	Henry Alexander, 5th Earl of Stirling	1691	1739	
Earl of Southesk (1633)	James Carnegie, 5th Earl of Southesk	1699	1716	Attainted
Earl of Traquair (1633)	Charles Stewart, 4th Earl of Traquair	1673	1741	
Earl of Wemyss (1633)	David Wemyss, 4th Earl of Wemyss	1705	1720	
Earl of Dalhousie (1633)	William Ramsay, 5th Earl of Dalhousie	1696	1710	Died
Earl of Dalhousie (1633)	William Ramsay, 6th Earl of Dalhousie	1710	1739	
Earl of Findlater (1638)	James Ogilvy, 3rd Earl of Findlater	1658	1711	Died
Earl of Findlater (1638)	James Ogilvy, 4th Earl of Findlater	1711	1730	
Earl of Airlie (1639)	David Ogilvy, 3rd Earl of Airlie	1703	1717	Died, his heir was under attainder
Earl of Carnwath (1639)	Robert Dalzell, 5th Earl of Carnwath	1683	1716	Attainted
Earl of Callendar (1641)	James Livingston, 4th Earl of Callendar	1692	1716	Attainted
Earl of Leven (1641)	David Leslie, 3rd Earl of Leven	1676	1728	
Earl of Dysart (1643)	Lionel Tollemache, 3rd Earl of Dysart	1698	1727	
Earl of Panmure (1646)	James Maule, 4th Earl of Panmure	1686	1716	Peerage forfeited
Earl of Selkirk (1646)	Charles Douglas, 2nd Earl of Selkirk	1694	1739	
Earl of Northesk (1647)	David Carnegie, 4th Earl of Northesk	1688	1729	
Earl of Kincardine (1647)	Robert Bruce, 5th Earl of Kincardine	1706	1718	Died
Earl of Kincardine (1647)	Alexander Bruce, 6th Earl of Kincardine	1718	1721	
Earl of Balcarres (1651)	Colin Lindsay, 3rd Earl of Balcarres	1662	1722	
Earl of Aboyne (1660)	John Gordon, 3rd Earl of Aboyne	1702	1732	
Earl of Newburgh (1660)	Charles Livingston, 2nd Earl of Newburgh	1670	1755	
Earl of Kilmarnock (1661)	William Boyd, 3rd Earl of Kilmarnock	1692	1717	Died
Earl of Kilmarnock (1661)	William Boyd, 4th Earl of Kilmarnock	1717	1746	
Earl of Forfar (1661)	Archibald Douglas, 1st Earl of Forfar	1661	1712	Died
Earl of Forfar (1661)	Archibald Douglas, 2nd Earl of Forfar	1712	1715	Died, title extinct
Earl of Dundonald (1669)	John Cochrane, 4th Earl of Dundonald	1705	1720	
Earl of Dumbarton (1675)	George Douglas, 2nd Earl of Dumbarton	1692	1749	
Earl of Kintore (1677)	John Keith, 1st Earl of Kintore	1677	1714	Died
Earl of Kintore (1677)	William Keith, 2nd Earl of Kintore	1714	1718	Died
Earl of Kintore (1677)	John Keith, 3rd Earl of Kintore	1718	1758	
Earl of Breadalbane and Holland (1677)	John Campbell, 1st Earl of Breadalbane and Holland	1677	1717	Died
Earl of Breadalbane and Holland (1677)	John Campbell, 2nd Earl of Breadalbane and Holland	1717	1752	
Earl of Aberdeen (1682)	George Gordon, 1st Earl of Aberdeen	1682	1720	
Earl of Dunmore (1686)	Charles Murray, 1st Earl of Dunmore	1686	1710	Died
Earl of Dunmore (1686)	John Murray, 2nd Earl of Dunmore	1710	1752	
Earl of Melville (1690)	George Melville, 1st Earl of Melville	1690	1707	Died, title succeeded by the Earl of Leven, see above
Earl of Orkney (1696)	George Hamilton, 1st Earl of Orkney	1696	1737	
Earl of Ruglen (1697)	John Hamilton, 1st Earl of Ruglen	1697	1744	
Earl of March (1697)	William Douglas, 2nd Earl of March	1705	1731	
Earl of Marchmont (1697)	Patrick Hume, 1st Earl of Marchmont	1697	1724	
Earl of Seafield (1701)	James Ogilvy, 1st Earl of Seafield	1701	1730	Succeeded to the Earldom of Findlater, see above
Earl of Hyndford (1701)	John Carmichael, 1st Earl of Hyndford	1701	1710	Died
Earl of Hyndford (1701)	James Carmichael, 2nd Earl of Hyndford	1710	1737	
Earl of Cromartie (1703)	George Mackenzie, 1st Earl of Cromartie	1703	1714	Died
Earl of Cromartie (1703)	John Mackenzie, 2nd Earl of Cromartie	1714	1731	
Earl of Stair (1703)	John Dalrymple, 2nd Earl of Stair	1707	1747	
Earl of Rosebery (1703)	Archibald Primrose, 1st Earl of Rosebery	1703	1723	
Earl of Glasgow (1703)	David Boyle, 1st Earl of Glasgow	1703	1733	
Earl of Portmore (1703)	David Colyear, 1st Earl of Portmore	1703	1730	
Earl of Bute (1703)	James Stuart, 1st Earl of Bute	1703	1710	Died
Earl of Bute (1703)	James Stuart, 2nd Earl of Bute	1710	1723	
Earl of Hopetoun (1703)	Charles Hope, 1st Earl of Hopetoun	1703	1742	
Earl of Deloraine (1706)	Henry Scott, 1st Earl of Deloraine	1706	1730	
Earl of Solway (1706)	Charles Douglas, 1st Earl of Solway	1706	1778	Succeeded to the Dukedom of Queensberry, see above
Earl of Ilay (1706)	Archibald Campbell, 1st Earl of Ilay	1706	1761	
Peerage of Great Britain
Earl of Oxford and Mortimer (1711)	Robert Harley, 1st Earl of Oxford and Earl Mortimer	1711	1724	New creation
Earl of Strafford (1711)	Thomas Wentworth, 1st Earl of Strafford	1711	1739	New creation
Earl Ferrers (1711)	Robert Shirley, 1st Earl Ferrers	1711	1717	New creation; died
Earl Ferrers (1711)	Washington Shirley, 2nd Earl Ferrers	1711	1729	
Earl of Dartmouth (1711)	William Legge, 1st Earl of Dartmouth	1711	1750	New creation
Earl of Tankerville (1714)	Charles Bennet, 1st Earl of Tankerville	1714	1722	New creation
Earl of Aylesford (1714)	Heneage Finch, 1st Earl of Aylesford	1714	1740	New creation; died
Earl of Aylesford (1714)	Heneage Finch, 2nd Earl of Aylesford	1740	1757	
Earl of Bristol (1714)	John Hervey, 1st Earl of Bristol	1714	1751	New creation
Earl of Carnarvon (1714)	James Brydges, 1st Earl of Carnarvon	1714	1744	New creation; created Duke of Chandos, see above
Earl of Rockingham (1714)	Lewis Watson, 1st Earl of Rockingham	1740	1724	New creation
Earl of Uxbridge (1714)	Henry Paget, 1st Earl of Uxbridge	1714	1743	New creation
Earl of Halifax (1714)	Charles Montagu, 1st Earl of Halifax	1714	1715	New creation; died, peerage extinct
Earl Granville (1715)	Grace Carteret, 1st Countess Granville	1715	1744	New creation
Earl of Halifax (1715)	George Montagu, 1st Earl of Halifax	1715	1739	New creation
Earl of Sussex (1717)	Talbot Yelverton, 1st Earl of Sussex	1717	1731	New creation
Earl Cowper (1718)	William Cowper, 1st Earl Cowper	1718	1723	New creation
Earl Stanhope (1718)	James Stanhope, 1st Earl Stanhope	1740	1721	New creation
Earl Cadogan (1718)	William Cadogan, 1st Earl Cadogan	1718	1726	New creation
Earl Coningsby (1719)	Thomas Coningsby, 1st Earl Coningsby	1719	1729	New creation
Earl of Harborough (1719)	Bennet Sherard, 1st Earl of Harborough	1719	1732	New creation

=== Viscounts ===
Title	Holder	Date gained	Date lost	Notes
Peerage of England
Viscount Hereford (1550)	Price Devereux, 9th Viscount Hereford	1700	1740	
Viscount Montagu (1554)	Francis Browne, 4th Viscount Montagu	1682	1708	Died
Viscount Montagu (1554)	Henry Browne, 5th Viscount Montagu	1708	1717	Died
Viscount Montagu (1554)	Anthony Browne, 6th Viscount Montagu	1717	1767	
Viscount Saye and Sele (1624)	Nathaniel Fiennes, 4th Viscount Saye and Sele	1698	1710	Died
Viscount Saye and Sele (1624)	Laurence Fiennes, 5th Viscount Saye and Sele	1710	1742	
Viscount Fauconberg (1643)	Thomas Belasyse, 3rd Viscount Fauconberg	1700	1718	Died
Viscount Fauconberg (1643)	Thomas Belasyse, 4th Viscount Fauconberg	1718	1774	
Viscount Hatton (1682)	William Seton Hatton, 2nd Viscount Hatton	1706	1760	
Viscount Townshend (1682)	Charles Townshend, 2nd Viscount Townshend	1687	1738	
Viscount Weymouth (1682)	Thomas Thynne, 1st Viscount Weymouth	1682	1714	Died
Viscount Weymouth (1682)	Thomas Thynne, 2nd Viscount Weymouth	1714	1751	
Viscount de Longueville (1690)	Talbot Yelverton, 2nd Viscount de Longueville	1704	1731	Created Earl of Sussex, see above
Viscount Lonsdale (1690)	Richard Lowther, 2nd Viscount Lonsdale	1700	1713	Died
Viscount Lonsdale (1690)	Henry Lowther, 3rd Viscount Lonsdale	1713	1751	
Peerage of Scotland
Viscount of Falkland (1620)	Lucius Cary, 6th Viscount of Falkland	1694	1730	
Viscount of Dunbar (1620)	Robert Constable, 3rd Viscount of Dunbar	1668	1714	Died
Viscount of Dunbar (1620)	William Constable, 4th Viscount of Dunbar	1714	1718	Died; Peerage dormant
Viscount of Stormont (1621)	David Murray, 5th Viscount of Stormont	1668	1731	
Viscount of Kenmure (1633)	William Gordon, 6th Viscount of Kenmure	1698	1715	Attainted
Viscount of Arbuthnott (1641)	Robert Arbuthnot, 4th Viscount of Arbuthnott	1694	1710	Died
Viscount of Arbuthnott (1641)	John Arbuthnot, 5th Viscount of Arbuthnott	1710	1756	
Viscount of Kingston (1651)	Archibald Seton, 2nd Viscount of Kingston	1691	1713	Died
Viscount of Kingston (1651)	James Seton, 3rd Viscount of Kingston	1713	1715	Attainted
Viscount of Irvine (1661)	Edward Machel Ingram, 4th Viscount of Irvine	1702	1714	Died
Viscount of Irvine (1661)	Rich Ingram, 5th Viscount of Irvine	1714	1721	
Viscount of Kilsyth (1661)	William Livingston, 3rd Viscount of Kilsyth	1706	1716	Attainted
Viscount Preston (1681)	Edward Graham, 2nd Viscount Preston	1695	1710	Died
Viscount Preston (1681)	Charles Graham, 3rd Viscount Preston	1710	1739	
Viscount of Newhaven (1681)	William Cheyne, 2nd Viscount Newhaven	1698	1728	
Viscount of Strathallan (1686)	William Drummond, 3rd Viscount Strathallan	1702	1711	Died
Viscount of Strathallan (1686)	William Drummond, 4th Viscount Strathallan	1711	1746	
Viscount of Teviot (1696)	Thomas Livingston, 1st Viscount Teviot	1696	1711	Died; Peerage extinct
Viscount of Garnock (1703)	John Lindsay-Crawford, 1st Viscount of Garnock	1703	1708	Died
Viscount of Garnock (1703)	Patrick Lindsay-Crawford, 2nd Viscount of Garnock	1708	1735	
Viscount of Primrose (1703)	Archibald Primrose, 2nd Viscount of Primrose	1706	1716	Died
Viscount of Primrose (1703)	Hugh Primrose, 3rd Viscount of Primrose	1716	1741	
Peerage of Great Britain
Viscount Bolingbroke (1712)	Henry St John, 1st Viscount Bolingbroke	1712	1751	New creation
Viscount Tadcaster (1714)	Henry O'Brien, 1st Viscount Tadcaster	1714	1741	New creation
Viscount St John (1716)	Henry St John, 1st Viscount St John	1716	1742	New creation
Viscount Coningsby (1716)	Margaret Newton, 1st Viscountess Coningsby	1717	1761	New creation
Viscount Cobham (1718)	Richard Temple, 1st Viscount Cobham	1718	1749	New creation

=== Barons ===
Title	Holder	Date gained	Date lost	Notes
Peerage of England
Baron FitzWalter (1295)	Charles Mildmay, 18th Baron FitzWalter	1679	1728	
Baron Ferrers of Chartley (1299)	Robert Shirley, 14th Baron Ferrers of Chartley	1677	1717	Died
Baron Ferrers of Chartley (1299)	Elizabeth Compton, 15th Baroness Ferrers of Chartley	1717	1741	
Baron Dudley (1440)	Edward Ward, 9th Baron Dudley	1704	1731	
Baron Stourton (1448)	Edward Stourton, 13th Baron Stourton	1685	1720	
Baron Willoughby de Broke (1491)	Richard Verney, 11th Baron Willoughby de Broke	1683	1711	Died
Baron Willoughby de Broke (1491)	George Verney, 12th Baron Willoughby de Broke	1711	1728	
Baron Wentworth (1529)	Martha Johnson, 8th Baroness Wentworth	1697	1745	
Baron Willoughby of Parham (1547)	Hugh Willoughby, 12th Baron Willoughby of Parham	1691	1712	Died
Baron Willoughby of Parham (1547)	Edward Willoughby, 13th Baron Willoughby of Parham	1712	1713	Died
Baron Willoughby of Parham (1547)	Charles Willoughby, 14th Baron Willoughby of Parham	1713	1715	Died
Baron Willoughby of Parham (1547)	Hugh Willoughby, 15th Baron Willoughby of Parham	1715	1765	
Baron Paget (1552)	William Paget, 6th Baron Paget	1678	1713	Died
Baron Paget (1552)	Henry Paget, 7th Baron Paget	1713	1743	Created Earl of Uxbridge, see above
Baron North (1554)	William North, 6th Baron North	1691	1734	
Baron Howard of Effingham (1554)	Thomas Howard, 6th Baron Howard of Effingham	1695	1725	
Baron Chandos (1554)	James Brydges, 8th Baron Chandos	1676	1714	Died
Baron Chandos (1554)	James Brydges, 9th Baron Chandos	1714	1744	Created Duke of Chandos, see above
Baron Hunsdon (1559)	William Ferdinand Carey, 8th Baron Hunsdon	1702	1765	
Baron St John of Bletso (1559)	Paulet St John, 8th Baron St John of Bletso	1711	1714	Barony previously held by the Earls of Bolingbroke; died
Baron St John of Bletso (1559)	William St John, 9th Baron St John of Bletso	1714	1720	
Baron De La Warr (1570)	John West, 6th Baron De La Warr	1687	1723	
Baron Gerard (1603)	Philip Gerard, 7th Baron Gerard	1707	1733	
Baron Petre (1603)	Robert Petre, 7th Baron Petre	1706	1713	Died
Baron Petre (1603)	Robert Petre, 8th Baron Petre	1713	1742	
Baron Arundell of Wardour (1605)	Thomas Arundell, 4th Baron Arundell of Wardour	1694	1712	Died
Baron Arundell of Wardour (1605)	Henry Arundell, 5th Baron Arundell of Wardour	1712	1726	
Baron Clifton (1608)	Edward Hyde, 9th Baron Clifton	1706	1713	Died
Baron Clifton (1608)	Theodosia Bligh, 10th Baroness Clifton	1713	1722	
Baron Dormer (1615)	Rowland Dormer, 4th Baron Dormer	1709	1712	Title previously held by the Earls of Carnarvon; died
Baron Dormer (1615)	Charles Dormer, 5th Baron Dormer	1712	1728	
Baron Teynham (1616)	Henry Roper, 8th Baron Teynham	1699	1723	
Baron Brooke (1621)	Fulke Greville, 5th Baron Brooke	1677	1710	Died
Baron Brooke (1621)	Fulke Greville, 6th Baron Brooke	1710	1711	
Baron Brooke (1621)	William Greville, 7th Baron Brooke	1711	1727	
Baron Craven (1627)	William Craven, 2nd Baron Craven	1697	1711	Died
Baron Craven (1627)	William Craven, 3rd Baron Craven	1711	1739	
Baron Lovelace (1627)	John Lovelace, 4th Baron Lovelace	1693	1709	Died
Baron Lovelace (1627)	John Lovelace, 5th Baron Lovelace	1709	1709	Died
Baron Lovelace (1627)	Nevill Lovelace, 6th Baron Lovelace	1709	1736	
Baron Strange (1628)	Henrietta Stanley, 4th Baroness Strange	1714	1718	Abeyance terminated; died
Baron Strange (1628)	Henrietta Ashburnham, 5th Baroness Strange	1718	1732	
Baron Maynard (1628)	Banastre Maynard, 3rd Baron Maynard	1699	1718	Died
Baron Maynard (1628)	Henry Maynard, 4th Baron Maynard	1718	1742	
Baron Mohun of Okehampton (1628)	Charles Mohun, 4th Baron Mohun of Okehampton	1677	1712	Died, title extinct
Baron Raby (1641)	Thomas Wentworth, 3rd Baron Raby	1695	1739	Created Earl of Strafford, see above
Baron Leigh (1643)	Thomas Leigh, 2nd Baron Leigh	1672	1710	Died
Baron Leigh (1643)	Edward Leigh, 3rd Baron Leigh	1710	1738	
Baron Jermyn (1643)	Henry Jermyn, 3rd Baron Jermyn	1703	1708	Died, title extinct
Baron Byron (1643)	William Byron, 4th Baron Byron	1695	1736	
Baron Widdrington (1643)	William Widdrington, 4th Baron Widdrington	1695	1716	Title forfeited
Baron Colepeper (1644)	John Colepeper, 3rd Baron of Colepeper	1689	1719	Died
Baron Colepeper (1644)	Cheney Colepeper, 4th Baron Colepeper	1719	1725	
Baron Rockingham (1645)	Lewis Watson, 3rd Baron Rockingham	1689	1724	Created Earl of Rockingham, see above
Baron Lexinton (1645)	Robert Sutton, 2nd Baron Lexinton	1668	1723	
Baron Langdale (1658)	Marmaduke Langdale, 3rd Baron Langdale	1703	1718	Died
Baron Langdale (1658)	Marmaduke Langdale, 4th Baron Langdale	1718	1771	
Baron Berkeley of Stratton (1658)	William Berkeley, 4th Baron Berkeley of Stratton	1697	1741	
Baron Cornwallis (1661)	Charles Cornwallis, 4th Baron Cornwallis	1698	1722	
Baron Crew (1661)	Nathaniel Crew, 3rd Baron Crew	1697	1721	
Baron Arundell of Trerice (1664)	John Arundell, 4th Baron Arundell of Trerice	1706	1768	
Baron Clifford of Chudleigh (1672)	Hugh Clifford, 2nd Baron Clifford of Chudleigh	1673	1730	
Baron Belasyse of Osgodby (1674)	Susan Belasyse, Baroness Belasyse	1674	1713	Died, title extinct
Baron Willoughby of Parham (1680)	Hugh Willoughby, 12th Baron Willoughby of Parham	1692	1712	Died
Baron Willoughby of Parham (1680)	Edward Willoughby, 13th Baron Willoughby of Parham	1712	1713	Died
Baron Willoughby of Parham (1680)	Charles Willoughby, 14th Baron Willoughby of Parham	1713	1715	Died
Baron Willoughby of Parham (1680)	Hugh Willoughby, 15th Baron Willoughby of Parham	1715	1765	
Baron Carteret (1681)	John Carteret, 2nd Baron Carteret	1695	1763	
Baron Ossulston (1682)	Charles Bennet, 2nd Baron Ossulston	1695	1722	Created Earl of Tankerville, see above
Baron Dartmouth (1682)	William Legge, 2nd Baron Dartmouth	1691	1750	Created Earl of Dartmouth, see above
Baron Stawell (1683)	William Stawell, 3rd Baron Stawell	1692	1742	
Baron Guilford (1683)	Francis North, 2nd Baron Guilford	1685	1729	
Baron Waldegrave (1686)	James Waldegrave, 2nd Baron Waldegrave	1689	1741	
Baron Griffin (1688)	Edward Griffin, 1st Baron Griffin	1688	1710	Died
Baron Griffin (1688)	James Griffin, 2nd Baron Griffin	1710	1715	
Baron Griffin (1688)	Edward Griffin, 3rd Baron Griffin	1715	1742	
Baron Ashburnham (1689)	John Ashburnham, 1st Baron Ashburnham	1689	1710	Died
Baron Ashburnham (1689)	William Ashburnham, 2nd Baron Ashburnham	1710	1710	Died
Baron Ashburnham (1689)	John Ashburnham, 3rd Baron Ashburnham	1710	1730	
Baron Leominster (1692)	William Fermor, 1st Baron Leominster	1692	1711	Died
Baron Leominster (1692)	Thomas Fermor, 2nd Baron Leominster	1711	1753	
Baron Herbert of Chirbury (1694)	Henry Herbert, 1st Baron Herbert of Chirbury	1694	1709	Died
Baron Herbert of Chirbury (1694)	Henry Herbert, 2nd Baron Herbert of Chirbury	1709	1738	
Baron Bergavenny (1695)	George Nevill, 13th Baron Bergavenny	1695	1721	
Baron Haversham (1696)	John Thompson, 1st Baron Haversham	1696	1710	Died
Baron Haversham (1696)	Maurice Thompson, 2nd Baron Haversham	1710	1745	
Baron Somers (1697]	John Somers, 1st Baron Somers	1697	1716	Died, title extinct
Baron Barnard (1698)	Christopher Vane, 1st Baron Barnard	1698	1723	
Baron Halifax (1700)	Charles Montagu, 1st Baron Halifax	1700	1715	Created Earl of Halifax (1714), see above
Baron Halifax (1700)	George Montagu, 2nd Baron Halifax	1715	1739	Created Earl of Halifax (1715), see above
Baron Granville of Potheridge (1703)	John Granville, 1st Baron Granville of Potheridge	1703	1707	Died, title extinct
Baron Guernsey (1703)	Heneage Finch, 1st Baron Guernsey	1703	1719	Created Earl of Aylesford, see above
Baron Gower (1703)	John Leveson-Gower, 1st Baron Gower	1703	1709	Died
Baron Gower (1703)	John Leveson-Gower, 2nd Baron Gower	1709	1754	
Baron Conway (1703)	Francis Seymour-Conway, 1st Baron Conway	1703	1732	
Baron Hervey (1703)	John Hervey, 1st Baron Hervey	1703	1751	Created Earl of Bristol, see above
Baron Cowper (1706)	William Cowper, 1st Baron Cowper	1706	1723	Created Earl Cowper, see above
Baron Pelham of Stanmer (1706)	Thomas Pelham, 1st Baron Pelham	1706	1712	Died
Baron Pelham of Stanmer (1706)	Thomas Pelham-Holles, 2nd Baron Pelham	1712	1768	Created Duke of Newcastle-upon-Tyne, see above
Peerage of Scotland
Lord Somerville (1430)	James Somerville, 12th Lord Somerville	1693	1709	Died
Lord Somerville (1430)	James Somerville, 13th Lord Somerville	1709	1765	
Lord Forbes (1442)	William Forbes, 12th Lord Forbes	1697	1716	Died
Lord Forbes (1442)	William Forbes, 13th Lord Forbes	1716	1730	
Lord Saltoun (1445)	William Fraser, 12th Lord Saltoun	1693	1715	Died
Lord Saltoun (1445)	Alexander Fraser, 13th Lord Saltoun	1715	1748	
Lord Gray (1445)	Patrick Gray, 8th Lord Gray	1663	1711	Died
Lord Gray (1445)	John Gray, 9th Lord Gray	1711	1724	
Lord Sinclair (1449)	Henry St Clair, 10th Lord Sinclair	1676	1723	
Lord Oliphant (1455)	Charles Oliphant, 7th Lord Oliphant	1680	1709	Died
Lord Oliphant (1455)	Patrick Oliphant, 8th Lord Oliphant	1709	1721	
Lord Cathcart (1460)	Alan Cathcart, 6th Lord Cathcart	1628	1709	Died
Lord Cathcart (1460)	Alan Cathcart, 7th Lord Cathcart	1709	1732	
Lord Lovat (1464)	Simon Fraser, 11th Lord Lovat	1699	1746	
Lord Sempill (1489)	Francis Sempill, 10th Lord Sempill	1695	1716	Died
Lord Sempill (1489)	John Sempill, 11th Lord Sempill	1716	1727	
Lord Ross (1499)	William Ross, 12th Lord Ross	1682	1738	
Lord Elphinstone (1509)	John Elphinstone, 8th Lord Elphinstone	1669	1718	Died
Lord Elphinstone (1509)	Charles Elphinstone, 9th Lord Elphinstone	1718	1757	
Lord Torphichen (1564)	James Sandilands, 7th Lord Torphichen	1696	1753	
Lord Lindores (1600)	David Leslie, 5th Lord Lindores	1706	1719	Died
Lord Lindores (1600)	Alexander Leslie, 6th Lord Lindores	1719	1765	
Lord Colville of Culross (1604)	Alexander Colville, 5th Lord Colville of Culross	1680	1717	Died
Lord Colville of Culross (1604)	John Colville, 6th Lord Colville of Culross	1717	1741	
Lord Balmerinoch (1606)	John Elphinstone, 4th Lord Balmerino	1704	1736	
Lord Blantyre (1606)	Walter Stuart, 6th Lord Blantyre	1704	1713	Died
Lord Blantyre (1606)	Robert Stuart, 7th Lord Blantyre	1713	1743	
Lord Balfour of Burleigh (1607)	Robert Balfour, 4th Lord Balfour of Burleigh	1688	1713	Died
Lord Balfour of Burleigh (1607)	Robert Balfour, 5th Lord Balfour of Burleigh	1713	1715	Peerage forfeited
Lord Cranstoun (1609)	William Cranstoun, 5th Lord Cranstoun	1688	1727	
Lord Dingwall (1609)	James Butler, 3rd Lord Dingwall	1684	1715	Attainted
Lord Aston of Forfar (1627)	Walter Aston, 3rd Lord Aston of Forfar	1678	1714	Died
Lord Aston of Forfar (1627)	Walter Aston, 4th Lord Aston of Forfar	1714	1748	
Lord Fairfax of Cameron (1627)	Thomas Fairfax, 5th Lord Fairfax of Cameron	1688	1710	Died
Lord Fairfax of Cameron (1627)	Thomas Fairfax, 6th Lord Fairfax of Cameron	1710	1781	
Lord Napier (1627)	Francis Napier, 6th Lord Napier	1706	1773	
Lord Reay (1628)	George Mackay, 3rd Lord Reay	1681	1748	
Lord Cramond (1628)	William Richardson, 4th Lord Cramond	1701	1719	Died
Lord Cramond (1628)	William Richardson, 5th Lord Cramond	1719	1735	
Lord Forbes of Pitsligo (1633)	Alexander Forbes, 4th Lord Forbes of Pitsligo	1690	1746	
Lord Kirkcudbright (1633)	James Maclellan, 6th Lord Kirkcudbright	1678	1730	
Lord Fraser (1633)	Charles Fraser, 4th Lord Fraser	Abt 1680	1720	
Lord Forrester (1633)	George Forrester, 5th Lord Forrester	1705	1727	
Lord Bargany (1641)	William Hamilton, 3rd Lord Bargany	1693	1712	Died
Lord Bargany (1641)	James Hamilton, 4th Lord Bargany	1712	1736	
Lord Banff (1642)	George Ogilvy, 3rd Lord Banff	1668	1713	Died
Lord Banff (1642)	George Ogilvy, 4th Lord Banff	1713	1718	
Lord Banff (1642)	John George Ogilvy, 5th Lord Banff	1718	1738	
Lord Elibank (1643)	Alexander Murray, 4th Lord Elibank	1687	1736	
Lord Falconer of Halkerton (1646)	David Falconer, 3rd Lord Falconer of Halkerton	1684	1724	
Lord Belhaven and Stenton (1647)	John Hamilton, 2nd Lord Belhaven and Stenton	1679	1708	Died
Lord Belhaven and Stenton (1647)	John Hamilton, 3rd Lord Belhaven and Stenton	1708	1721	
Lord Duffus (1650)	Kenneth Sutherland, 3rd Lord Duffus	1705	1734	
Lord Rollo (1651)	Robert Rollo, 4th Lord Rollo	1700	1758	
Lord Ruthven of Freeland (1650)	Jean Ruthven, 3rd Lady Ruthven of Freeland	1701	1722	
Lord Rutherfurd (1661)	Robert Rutherfurd, 4th Lord Rutherfurd	1685	1724	
Lord Bellenden (1661)	John Bellenden, 3rd Lord Bellenden	1707	1741	
Lord Nairne (1681)	William Murray, 2nd Lord Nairne	1683	1716	Attainted
Lord Kinnaird (1682)	Patrick Kinnaird, 3rd Lord Kinnaird	1701	1715	Died
Lord Kinnaird (1682)	Patrick Kinnaird, 4th Lord Kinnaird	1715	1727	
Peerage of Great Britain
Baron Harcourt (1711)	Simon Harcourt, 1st Baron Harcourt	1711	1727	New creation
Baron Hay (1711)	George Hay, 1st Baron Hay	1711	1727	New creation; succeeded to the Earldom of Kinnoull
Baron Bathurst (1712)	Allen Bathurst, 1st Baron Bathurst	1712	1775	New creation
Baron Middleton (1712)	Thomas Willoughby, 1st Baron Middleton	1712	1729	New creation
Baron Foley (1712)	Thomas Foley, 1st Baron Foley	1712	1733	New creation
Baron Lansdowne (1712)	George Granville, 1st Baron Lansdowne	1712	1735	New creation
Baron Mansel (1712)	Thomas Mansel, 1st Baron Mansel	1712	1723	New creation
Baron Trevor (1712)	Thomas Trevor, 1st Baron Trevor	1712	1730	New creation
Baron Bingley (1713)	Robert Benson, 1st Baron Bingley	1713	1731	New creation
Baron Carleton (1714)	Henry Boyle, 1st Baron Carleton	1714	1725	New creation
Baron Parker (1716)	Thomas Parker, 1st Baron Parker	1716	1732	New creation
Baron Onslow (1716)	Richard Onslow, 1st Baron Onslow	1716	1717	New creation; died
Baron Onslow (1716)	Thomas Onslow, 2nd Baron Onslow	1717	1740	
Baron Torrington (1716)	Thomas Newport, 1st Baron Torrington	1716	1719	New creation; died, title extinct
Baron Romney (1716)	Robert Marsham, 1st Baron Romney	1716	1724	New creation
Baron Newburgh (1716)	George Cholmondeley, 1st Baron Newburgh	1716	1733	New creation
Baron Pawlett of Basing (1717)	Charles Powlett, 1st Baron Pawlett of Basing	1717	1754	New creation

Preceded by List of peers 1700–1707	Lists of peers by decade 1707–1719	Succeeded by List of peers 1720–1729
