= List of peers 1720–1729 =

This page lists all peers who held extant titles between 1720 and 1729.

== Peerage of England, Scotland and Great Britain ==
=== Dukes ===
Title	Holder	Date gained	Date lost	Notes
Peerage of England
Duke of Cornwall (1337)	Prince George, Prince of Wales	1714	1727	Succeeded to the Throne
Duke of Cornwall (1337)	Frederick, Prince of Wales	1727	1751	Created Duke of Edinburgh in 1726
Duke of Norfolk (1483)	Thomas Howard, 8th Duke of Norfolk	1701	1732	
Duke of Somerset (1547)	Charles Seymour, 6th Duke of Somerset	1678	1748	
Duke of Cleveland (1670)	Charles FitzRoy, 2nd Duke of Cleveland	1709	1730	
Duke of Portsmouth (1673)	Louise de Kérouaille, Duchess of Portsmouth	1673	1734	
Duke of Richmond (1675)	Charles Lennox, 1st Duke of Richmond	1675	1723	Died
Duke of Richmond (1675)	Charles Lennox, 2nd Duke of Richmond	1723	1750	
Duke of Grafton (1675)	Charles FitzRoy, 2nd Duke of Grafton	1690	1757	
Duke of Beaufort (1682)	Henry Scudamore, 3rd Duke of Beaufort	1714	1745	
Duke of St Albans (1684)	Charles Beauclerk, 1st Duke of St Albans	1684	1726	Died
Duke of St Albans (1684)	Charles Beauclerk, 2nd Duke of St Albans	1726	1751	
Duke of Bolton (1689)	Charles Paulet, 2nd Duke of Bolton	1699	1722	Died
Duke of Bolton (1689)	Charles Powlett, 3rd Duke of Bolton	1722	1754	
Duke of Leeds (1694)	Peregrine Osborne, 2nd Duke of Leeds	1712	1729	Died
Duke of Leeds (1694)	Peregrine Osborne, 3rd Duke of Leeds	1729	1731	
Duke of Bedford (1694)	Wriothesley Russell, 3rd Duke of Bedford	1711	1732	
Duke of Devonshire (1694)	William Cavendish, 2nd Duke of Devonshire	1707	1729	Died
Duke of Devonshire (1694)	William Cavendish, 3rd Duke of Devonshire	1729	1755	
Duke of Marlborough (1702)	John Churchill, 1st Duke of Marlborough	1702	1722	Died
Duke of Marlborough (1702)	Henrietta Godolphin, 2nd Duchess of Marlborough	1722	1733	
Duke of Buckingham and Normanby (1703)	John Sheffield, 1st Duke of Buckingham and Normanby	1703	1721	Died
Duke of Buckingham and Normanby (1703)	Edmund Sheffield, 2nd Duke of Buckingham and Normanby	1721	1735	
Duke of Rutland (1703)	John Manners, 2nd Duke of Rutland	1711	1721	Died
Duke of Rutland (1703)	John Manners, 3rd Duke of Rutland	1721	1779	
Duke of Montagu (1705)	John Montagu, 2nd Duke of Montagu	1709	1749	
Peerage of Scotland
Duke of Hamilton (1643)	James Hamilton, 5th Duke of Hamilton	1712	1743	
Duke of Buccleuch (1663)	Anne Scott, 1st Duchess of Buccleuch	1663	1732	
Duke of Queensberry (1684)	Charles Douglas, 3rd Duke of Queensberry	1711	1778	
Duke of Gordon (1684)	Alexander Gordon, 2nd Duke of Gordon	1716	1728	Died
Duke of Gordon (1684)	Cosmo Gordon, 3rd Duke of Gordon	1728	1752	
Duke of Argyll (1701)	John Campbell, 2nd Duke of Argyll	1703	1743	
Duke of Atholl (1703)	John Murray, 1st Duke of Atholl	1703	1724	Died
Duke of Atholl (1703)	James Murray, 2nd Duke of Atholl	1724	1764	
Duke of Douglas (1703)	Archibald Douglas, 1st Duke of Douglas	1703	1761	
Duke of Montrose (1707)	James Graham, 1st Duke of Montrose	1707	1742	
Duke of Roxburghe (1707)	John Ker, 1st Duke of Roxburghe	1707	1741	
Peerage of Great Britain
Duke of Kent (1710)	Henry Grey, 1st Duke of Kent	1710	1740	
Duke of Ancaster and Kesteven (1715)	Robert Bertie, 1st Duke of Ancaster and Kesteven	1715	1723	Died
Duke of Ancaster and Kesteven (1715)	Peregrine Bertie, 2nd Duke of Ancaster and Kesteven	1723	1742	
Duke of Kingston-upon-Hull (1715)	Evelyn Pierrepont, 1st Duke of Kingston-upon-Hull	1715	1726	Died
Duke of Kingston-upon-Hull (1715)	Evelyn Pierrepont, 2nd Duke of Kingston-upon-Hull	1726	1773	
Duke of Newcastle upon Tyne (1715)	Thomas Pelham-Holles, 1st Duke of Newcastle	1715	1768	
Duke of York and Albany (1716)	Ernest Augustus, Duke of York and Albany	1716	1728	Died, title extinct
Duke of Portland (1716)	Henry Bentinck, 1st Duke of Portland	1716	1726	Died
Duke of Portland (1716)	William Bentinck, 2nd Duke of Portland	1726	1762	
Duke of Wharton (1716)	Philip Wharton, 1st Duke of Wharton	1718	1729	Titles were forfeited
Duchess of Kendal (1719)	Melusine von der Schulenburg, Duchess of Kendal	1719	1743	
Duke of Manchester (1719)	Charles Montagu, 1st Duke of Manchester	1719	1722	Died
Duke of Manchester (1719)	William Montagu, 2nd Duke of Manchester	1722	1739	
Duke of Chandos (1719)	James Brydges, 1st Duke of Chandos	1719	1744	
Duke of Dorset (1720)	Lionel Sackville, 1st Duke of Dorset	1720	1765	New creation
Duke of Bridgewater (1720)	Scroop Egerton, 1st Duke of Bridgewater	1720	1745	New creation
Duke of Cumberland (1726)	Prince William, Duke of Cumberland	1726	1765	New creation

=== Marquesses ===
Title	Holder	Date gained	Date lost	Notes
Peerage of England
Marquess of Powis (1687)	William Herbert, 2nd Marquess of Powis	1696	1745	
Peerage of Scotland
Marquess of Tweeddale (1694)	John Hay, 4th Marquess of Tweeddale	1715	1762	
Marquess of Lothian (1701)	William Kerr, 2nd Marquess of Lothian	1703	1722	Died
Marquess of Lothian (1701)	William Kerr, 3rd Marquess of Lothian	1722	1767	
Marquess of Annandale (1701)	William Johnstone, 1st Marquess of Annandale	1701	1721	Died
Marquess of Annandale (1701)	James Johnstone, 2nd Marquess of Annandale	1721	1730	
Peerage of Great Britain
-

=== Earls ===
Title	Holder	Date gained	Date lost	Notes
Peerage of England
Earl of Shrewsbury (1442)	Gilbert Talbot, 13th Earl of Shrewsbury	1718	1743	
Earl of Derby (1485)	James Stanley, 10th Earl of Derby	1702	1736	
Earl of Huntingdon (1529)	Theophilus Hastings, 9th Earl of Huntingdon	1705	1746	
Earl of Pembroke (1551)	Thomas Herbert, 8th Earl of Pembroke	1683	1733	
Earl of Devon (1553)	William Courtenay, de jure 6th Earl of Devon	1702	1735	
Earl of Lincoln (1572)	Henry Clinton, 7th Earl of Lincoln	1693	1728	Died
Earl of Lincoln (1572)	George Clinton, 8th Earl of Lincoln	1728	1730	
Earl of Suffolk (1603)	Charles Howard, 7th Earl of Suffolk	1718	1722	Died
Earl of Suffolk (1603)	Edward Howard, 8th Earl of Suffolk	1722	1731	
Earl of Dorset (1604)	Lionel Sackville, 7th Earl of Dorset	1706	1765	Created Duke of Dorset, see above
Earl of Exeter (1605)	John Cecil, 6th Earl of Exeter	1700	1721	Died
Earl of Exeter (1605)	John Cecil, 7th Earl of Exeter	1721	1722	Died
Earl of Exeter (1605)	Brownlow Cecil, 8th Earl of Exeter	1722	1754	
Earl of Salisbury (1605)	James Cecil, 5th Earl of Salisbury	1694	1728	Died
Earl of Salisbury (1605)	James Cecil, 6th Earl of Salisbury	1728	1780	
Earl of Bridgewater (1617)	Scroop Egerton, 4th Earl of Bridgewater	1701	1744	Created Duke of Bridgewater, see above
Earl of Northampton (1618)	George Compton, 4th Earl of Northampton	1681	1727	Died
Earl of Northampton (1618)	James Compton, 5th Earl of Northampton	1727	1754	
Earl of Leicester (1618)	John Sidney, 6th Earl of Leicester	1705	1737	
Earl of Warwick (1618)	Edward Rich, 7th Earl of Warwick	1702	1721	Died
Earl of Warwick (1618)	Edward Rich, 8th Earl of Warwick	1721	1759	
Earl of Denbigh (1622)	William Feilding, 5th Earl of Denbigh	1717	1755	
Earl of Westmorland (1624)	Thomas Fane, 6th Earl of Westmorland	1699	1736	
Earl of Berkshire (1626)	Henry Howard, 4th Earl of Berkshire	1706	1757	
Earl Rivers (1626)	John Savage, 5th Earl Rivers	1712	1737	
Earl of Peterborough (1628)	Charles Mordaunt, 3rd Earl of Peterborough	1697	1735	
Earl of Stamford (1628)	Thomas Grey, 2nd Earl of Stamford	1673	1720	Died
Earl of Stamford (1628)	Harry Grey, 3rd Earl of Stamford	1720	1739	
Earl of Winchilsea (1628)	Heneage Finch, 5th Earl of Winchilsea	1712	1726	Died
Earl of Winchilsea (1628)	John Finch, 6th Earl of Winchilsea	1726	1729	Died
Earl of Winchilsea (1628)	Daniel Finch, 7th Earl of Winchilsea	1729	1730	
Earl of Chesterfield (1628)	Philip Stanhope, 3rd Earl of Chesterfield	1714	1726	Died
Earl of Chesterfield (1628)	Philip Stanhope, 4th Earl of Chesterfield	1726	1773	
Earl of Thanet (1628)	Thomas Tufton, 6th Earl of Thanet	1684	1729	Died
Earl of Thanet (1628)	Sackville Tufton, 7th Earl of Thanet	1729	1753	
Earl of Sunderland (1643)	Charles Spencer, 3rd Earl of Sunderland	1702	1722	Died
Earl of Sunderland (1643)	Robert Spencer, 4th Earl of Sunderland	1722	1729	Died
Earl of Sunderland (1643)	Charles Spencer, 5th Earl of Sunderland	1729	1758	
Earl of Scarsdale (1645)	Nicholas Leke, 4th Earl of Scarsdale	1707	1736	
Earl of Sandwich (1660)	Edward Montagu, 3rd Earl of Sandwich	1688	1729	Died
Earl of Sandwich (1660)	John Montagu, 4th Earl of Sandwich	1729	1792	
Earl of Anglesey (1661)	Arthur Annesley, 5th Earl of Anglesey	1710	1737	
Earl of Cardigan (1661)	George Brudenell, 3rd Earl of Cardigan	1703	1732	
Earl of Clarendon (1661)	Edward Hyde, 3rd Earl of Clarendon	1709	1723	Died
Earl of Clarendon (1661)	Henry Hyde, 4th Earl of Clarendon	1723	1753	
Earl of Essex (1661)	William Capell, 3rd Earl of Essex	1710	1743	
Earl of Carlisle (1661)	Charles Howard, 3rd Earl of Carlisle	1692	1738	
Earl of Ailesbury (1664)	Thomas Bruce, 2nd Earl of Ailesbury	1685	1741	
Earl of Burlington (1664)	Richard Boyle, 3rd Earl of Burlington	1704	1753	Earl of Cork in the Peerage of Ireland
Earl of Arlington (1672)	Isabella Fitzroy, 2nd Countess of Arlington	1685	1723	Died; Earldom succeeded by the Duke of Grafton
Earl of Shaftesbury (1672)	Anthony Ashley Cooper, 4th Earl of Shaftesbury	1713	1771	
Earl of Lichfield (1674)	George Lee, 2nd Earl of Lichfield	1716	1742	
Earl of Radnor (1679)	Charles Robartes, 2nd Earl of Radnor	1685	1723	Died
Earl of Radnor (1679)	Henry Robartes, 3rd Earl of Radnor	1723	1741	
Earl of Yarmouth (1679)	William Paston, 2nd Earl of Yarmouth	1683	1732	
Earl of Berkeley (1679)	James Berkeley, 3rd Earl of Berkeley	1710	1736	
Earl of Nottingham (1681)	Daniel Finch, 2nd Earl of Nottingham	1682	1730	Succeeded to the more senior Earldom of Winchilsea, see above
Earl of Rochester (1682)	Henry Hyde, 2nd Earl of Rochester	1711	1753	Succeeded to the more senior Earldom of Clarendon, see above
Earl of Abingdon (1682)	Montagu Venables-Bertie, 2nd Earl of Abingdon	1699	1743	
Earl of Gainsborough (1682)	Baptist Noel, 4th Earl of Gainsborough	1714	1751	
Earl of Plymouth (1682)	Other Windsor, 2nd Earl of Plymouth	1687	1727	Died
Earl of Plymouth (1682)	Other Windsor, 3rd Earl of Plymouth	1727	1732	
Earl of Holderness (1682)	Robert Darcy, 3rd Earl of Holderness	1692	1721	Died
Earl of Holderness (1682)	Robert Darcy, 4th Earl of Holderness	1722	1778	
Earl of Stafford (1688)	William Stafford-Howard, 2nd Earl of Stafford	1719	1734	
Earl of Warrington (1690)	George Booth, 2nd Earl of Warrington	1694	1758	
Earl of Scarbrough (1690)	Richard Lumley, 1st Earl of Scarbrough	1690	1721	Died
Earl of Scarbrough (1690)	Richard Lumley, 2nd Earl of Scarbrough	1721	1739	
Earl of Bradford (1694)	Richard Newport, 2nd Earl of Bradford	1708	1723	Died
Earl of Bradford (1694)	Henry Newport, 3rd Earl of Bradford	1723	1734	
Earl of Rochford (1695)	Frederick Nassau de Zuylestein, 3rd Earl of Rochford	1710	1738	
Earl of Albemarle (1697)	Willem van Keppel, 2nd Earl of Albemarle	1718	1754	
Earl of Coventry (1697)	William Coventry, 5th Earl of Coventry	1719	1751	
Earl of Orford (1697)	Edward Russell, 1st Earl of Orford	1697	1727	Died, title extinct
Earl of Jersey (1697)	William Villiers, 2nd Earl of Jersey	1711	1721	Died
Earl of Jersey (1697)	William Villiers, 3rd Earl of Jersey	1721	1769	
Earl of Grantham (1698)	Henry de Nassau d'Auverquerque, 1st Earl of Grantham	1698	1754	
Earl Poulett (1706)	John Poulett, 1st Earl Poulett	1706	1743	
Earl of Godolphin (1706)	Francis Godolphin, 2nd Earl of Godolphin	1712	1766	
Earl of Cholmondeley (1706)	Hugh Cholmondeley, 1st Earl of Cholmondeley	1706	1725	
Earl of Cholmondeley (1706)	George Cholmondeley, 2nd Earl of Cholmondeley	1725	1733	
Peerage of Scotland
Earl of Crawford (1398)	John Lindsay, 20th Earl of Crawford	1713	1749	
Earl of Erroll (1452)	Mary Hay, 14th Countess of Erroll	1717	1758	
Earl of Sutherland (1235)	John Gordon, 16th Earl of Sutherland	1703	1733	
Earl of Rothes (1458)	John Hamilton-Leslie, 9th Earl of Rothes	1700	1722	Died
Earl of Rothes (1458)	John Leslie, 10th Earl of Rothes	1722	1767	
Earl of Morton (1458)	Robert Douglas, 12th Earl of Morton	1715	1730	
Earl of Glencairn (1488)	William Cunningham, 12th Earl of Glencairn	1703	1734	
Earl of Eglinton (1507)	Alexander Montgomerie, 9th Earl of Eglinton	1701	1729	Died
Earl of Eglinton (1507)	Alexander Montgomerie, 10th Earl of Eglinton	1729	1769	
Earl of Cassilis (1509)	John Kennedy, 8th Earl of Cassilis	1701	1759	
Earl of Caithness (1455)	Alexander Sinclair, 9th Earl of Caithness	1705	1765	
Earl of Buchan (1469)	David Erskine, 9th Earl of Buchan	1695	1745	
Earl of Moray (1562)	Charles Stuart, 6th Earl of Moray	1701	1735	
Earl of Home (1605)	Alexander Home, 7th Earl of Home	1706	1720	Died
Earl of Home (1605)	William Home, 8th Earl of Home	1720	1761	
Earl of Wigtown (1606)	John Fleming, 6th Earl of Wigtown	1681	1744	
Earl of Abercorn (1606)	James Hamilton, 6th Earl of Abercorn	1701	1734	
Earl of Strathmore and Kinghorne (1606)	Charles Lyon, 6th Earl of Strathmore and Kinghorne	1715	1728	Died
Earl of Strathmore and Kinghorne (1606)	James Lyon, 7th Earl of Strathmore and Kinghorne	1728	1735	
Earl of Kellie (1619)	Alexander Erskine, 5th Earl of Kellie	1710	1758	
Earl of Haddington (1619)	Thomas Hamilton, 6th Earl of Haddington	1685	1735	
Earl of Galloway (1623)	James Stewart, 5th Earl of Galloway	1694	1746	
Earl of Lauderdale (1624)	Charles Maitland, 6th Earl of Lauderdale	1710	1744	
Earl of Loudoun (1633)	Hugh Campbell, 3rd Earl of Loudoun	1684	1731	
Earl of Kinnoull (1633)	George Hay, 8th Earl of Kinnoull	1709	1758	
Earl of Dumfries (1633)	Penelope Crichton, 4th Countess of Dumfries	1694	1742	
Earl of Stirling (1633)	Henry Alexander, 5th Earl of Stirling	1691	1739	
Earl of Traquair (1633)	Charles Stewart, 4th Earl of Traquair	1673	1741	
Earl of Wemyss (1633)	David Wemyss, 4th Earl of Wemyss	1705	1720	Died
Earl of Wemyss (1633)	James Wemyss, 5th Earl of Wemyss	1720	1756	
Earl of Dalhousie (1633)	William Ramsay, 6th Earl of Dalhousie	1710	1739	
Earl of Findlater (1638)	James Ogilvy, 4th Earl of Findlater	1711	1730	
Earl of Leven (1641)	David Leslie, 3rd Earl of Leven	1676	1728	Died
Earl of Leven (1641)	Alexander Leslie, 5th Earl of Leven	1728	1754	
Earl of Dysart (1643)	Lionel Tollemache, 3rd Earl of Dysart	1698	1727	Died
Earl of Dysart (1643)	Lionel Tollemache, 4th Earl of Dysart	1727	1770	
Earl of Selkirk (1646)	Charles Douglas, 2nd Earl of Selkirk	1694	1739	
Earl of Northesk (1647)	David Carnegie, 4th Earl of Northesk	1688	1729	Died
Earl of Northesk (1647)	David Carnegie, 5th Earl of Northesk	1729	1741	
Earl of Kincardine (1647)	Alexander Bruce, 6th Earl of Kincardine	1718	1721	Died
Earl of Kincardine (1647)	Thomas Bruce, 7th Earl of Kincardine	1721	1740	
Earl of Balcarres (1651)	Colin Lindsay, 3rd Earl of Balcarres	1662	1722	Died
Earl of Balcarres (1651)	Alexander Lindsay, 4th Earl of Balcarres	1722	1736	
Earl of Aboyne (1660)	John Gordon, 3rd Earl of Aboyne	1702	1732	
Earl of Newburgh (1660)	Charles Livingston, 2nd Earl of Newburgh	1670	1755	
Earl of Kilmarnock (1661)	William Boyd, 4th Earl of Kilmarnock	1717	1746	
Earl of Dundonald (1669)	John Cochrane, 4th Earl of Dundonald	1705	1720	Died
Earl of Dundonald (1669)	William Cochrane, 5th Earl of Dundonald	1720	1725	Died
Earl of Dundonald (1669)	Thomas Cochrane, 6th Earl of Dundonald	1725	1737	
Earl of Dumbarton (1675)	George Douglas, 2nd Earl of Dumbarton	1692	1749	
Earl of Kintore (1677)	John Keith, 3rd Earl of Kintore	1718	1758	
Earl of Breadalbane and Holland (1677)	John Campbell, 2nd Earl of Breadalbane and Holland	1717	1752	
Earl of Aberdeen (1682)	George Gordon, 1st Earl of Aberdeen	1682	1720	Died
Earl of Aberdeen (1682)	William Gordon, 2nd Earl of Aberdeen	1720	1746	
Earl of Dunmore (1686)	John Murray, 2nd Earl of Dunmore	1710	1752	
Earl of Orkney (1696)	George Hamilton, 1st Earl of Orkney	1696	1737	
Earl of Ruglen (1697)	John Hamilton, 1st Earl of Ruglen	1697	1744	
Earl of March (1697)	William Douglas, 2nd Earl of March	1705	1731	
Earl of Marchmont (1697)	Patrick Hume, 1st Earl of Marchmont	1697	1724	Died
Earl of Marchmont (1697)	Alexander Hume-Campbell, 2nd Earl of Marchmont	1724	1740	
Earl of Hyndford (1701)	James Carmichael, 2nd Earl of Hyndford	1710	1737	
Earl of Cromartie (1703)	John Mackenzie, 2nd Earl of Cromartie	1714	1731	
Earl of Stair (1703)	John Dalrymple, 2nd Earl of Stair	1707	1747	
Earl of Rosebery (1703)	Archibald Primrose, 1st Earl of Rosebery	1703	1723	Died
Earl of Rosebery (1703)	James Primrose, 2nd Earl of Rosebery	1723	1765	
Earl of Glasgow (1703)	David Boyle, 1st Earl of Glasgow	1703	1733	
Earl of Portmore (1703)	David Colyear, 1st Earl of Portmore	1703	1730	
Earl of Bute (1703)	James Stuart, 2nd Earl of Bute	1710	1723	Died
Earl of Bute (1703)	John Stuart, 3rd Earl of Bute	1723	1792	
Earl of Hopetoun (1703)	Charles Hope, 1st Earl of Hopetoun	1703	1742	
Earl of Deloraine (1706)	Henry Scott, 1st Earl of Deloraine	1706	1730	
Earl of Ilay (1706)	Archibald Campbell, 1st Earl of Ilay	1706	1761	
Peerage of Great Britain
Earl of Oxford and Mortimer (1711)	Robert Harley, 1st Earl of Oxford and Earl Mortimer	1711	1724	Died
Earl of Oxford and Mortimer (1711)	Edward Harley, 2nd Earl of Oxford and Earl Mortimer	1724	1741	
Earl of Strafford (1711)	Thomas Wentworth, 1st Earl of Strafford	1711	1739	
Earl Ferrers (1711)	Washington Shirley, 2nd Earl Ferrers	1711	1729	Died
Earl Ferrers (1711)	Henry Shirley, 3rd Earl Ferrers	1729	1745	
Earl of Dartmouth (1711)	William Legge, 1st Earl of Dartmouth	1711	1750	
Earl of Tankerville (1714)	Charles Bennet, 1st Earl of Tankerville	1714	1722	Died
Earl of Tankerville (1714)	Charles Bennet, 2nd Earl of Tankerville	1722	1753	
Earl of Aylesford (1714)	Heneage Finch, 2nd Earl of Aylesford	1740	1757	
Earl of Bristol (1714)	John Hervey, 1st Earl of Bristol	1714	1751	
Earl of Rockingham (1714)	Lewis Watson, 1st Earl of Rockingham	1740	1724	Died
Earl of Rockingham (1714)	Lewis Watson, 2nd Earl of Rockingham	1724	1745	
Earl of Uxbridge (1714)	Henry Paget, 1st Earl of Uxbridge	1714	1743	
Earl Granville (1715)	Grace Carteret, 1st Countess Granville	1715	1744	
Earl of Halifax (1715)	George Montagu, 1st Earl of Halifax	1715	1739	
Earl of Sussex (1717)	Talbot Yelverton, 1st Earl of Sussex	1717	1731	
Earl Cowper (1718)	William Cowper, 1st Earl Cowper	1718	1723	Died
Earl Cowper (1718)	William Clavering-Cowper, 2nd Earl Cowper	1723	1764	
Earl Stanhope (1718)	James Stanhope, 1st Earl Stanhope	1740	1721	Died
Earl Stanhope (1718)	Philip Stanhope, 2nd Earl Stanhope	1721	1786	
Earl Cadogan (1718)	William Cadogan, 1st Earl Cadogan	1718	1726	Died, peerage extinct
Earl Coningsby (1719)	Thomas Coningsby, 1st Earl Coningsby	1719	1729	Died
Earl Coningsby (1719)	Margaret Newton, 2nd Countess Coningsby	1729	1761	
Earl of Harborough (1719)	Bennet Sherard, 1st Earl of Harborough	1719	1732	
Earl Castleton (1720)	James Saunderson, 1st Earl Castleton	1720	1723	New creation; died, title extinct
Earl of Macclesfield (1721)	Thomas Parker, 1st Earl of Macclesfield	1721	1732	New creation
Earl of Pomfret (1721)	Thomas Fermor, 1st Earl of Pomfret	1721	1753	New creation
Countess of Darlington (1721)	Sophia von Kielmansegg, Countess of Darlington	1721	1725	New creation; died, title extinct
Countess of Walsingham (1722)	Melusina von der Schulenburg, Countess of Walsingham	1722	1778	New creation
Earl Graham of Belford (1722)	William Graham, 1st Earl Graham	1722	1790	New creation
Earl Ker (1722)	Robert Ker, 1st Earl Ker	1722	1790	New creation
Earl Waldegrave (1729)	James Waldegrave, 1st Earl Waldegrave	1729	1741	New creation

=== Viscounts ===
Title	Holder	Date gained	Date lost	Notes
Peerage of England
Viscount Hereford (1550)	Price Devereux, 9th Viscount Hereford	1700	1740	
Viscount Montagu (1554)	Anthony Browne, 6th Viscount Montagu	1717	1767	
Viscount Saye and Sele (1624)	Laurence Fiennes, 5th Viscount Saye and Sele	1710	1742	
Viscount Fauconberg (1643)	Thomas Belasyse, 4th Viscount Fauconberg	1718	1774	
Viscount Hatton (1682)	William Seton Hatton, 2nd Viscount Hatton	1706	1760	
Viscount Townshend (1682)	Charles Townshend, 2nd Viscount Townshend	1687	1738	
Viscount Weymouth (1682)	Thomas Thynne, 2nd Viscount Weymouth	1714	1751	
Viscount Lonsdale (1690)	Henry Lowther, 3rd Viscount Lonsdale	1713	1751	
Peerage of Scotland
Viscount of Falkland (1620)	Lucius Cary, 6th Viscount of Falkland	1694	1730	
Viscount of Stormont (1621)	David Murray, 5th Viscount of Stormont	1668	1731	
Viscount of Arbuthnott (1641)	John Arbuthnot, 5th Viscount of Arbuthnott	1710	1756	
Viscount of Irvine (1661)	Rich Ingram, 5th Viscount of Irvine	1714	1721	Died
Viscount of Irvine (1661)	Arthur Ingram, 6th Viscount of Irvine	1721	1736	
Viscount Preston (1681)	Charles Graham, 3rd Viscount Preston	1710	1739	
Viscount of Newhaven (1681)	William Cheyne, 2nd Viscount Newhaven	1698	1728	Died; Peerage extinct
Viscount of Strathallan (1686)	William Drummond, 4th Viscount Strathallan	1711	1746	
Viscount of Garnock (1703)	Patrick Lindsay-Crawford, 2nd Viscount of Garnock	1708	1735	
Viscount of Primrose (1703)	Hugh Primrose, 3rd Viscount of Primrose	1716	1741	
Peerage of Great Britain
Viscount Bolingbroke (1712)	Henry St John, 1st Viscount Bolingbroke	1712	1751	
Viscount Tadcaster (1714)	Henry O'Brien, 1st Viscount Tadcaster	1714	1741	
Viscount St John (1716)	Henry St John, 1st Viscount St John	1716	1742	
Viscount Coningsby (1716)	Margaret Newton, 1st Viscountess Coningsby	1717	1761	Succeeded to the Earldom of Coningsby, see above
Viscount Cobham (1718)	Richard Temple, 1st Viscount Cobham	1718	1749	
Viscount Falmouth (1720)	Hugh Boscawen, 1st Viscount Falmouth	1720	1734	New creation
Viscount Lymington (1720)	John Wallop, 1st Viscount Lymington	1720	1762	New creation
Viscount Torrington (1721)	George Byng, 1st Viscount Torrington	1721	1733	New creation
Viscount Harcourt (1721)	Simon Harcourt, 1st Viscount Harcourt	1721	1727	New creation; died
Viscount Harcourt (1721)	Simon Harcourt, 2nd Viscount Harcourt	1727	1777	

=== Barons ===
Title	Holder	Date gained	Date lost	Notes
Peerage of England
Baron FitzWalter (1295)	Charles Mildmay, 18th Baron FitzWalter	1679	1728	Died
Baron FitzWalter (1295)	Benjamin Mildmay, 19th Baron FitzWalter	1728	1756	
Baron Clinton (1299)	Hugh Fortescue, 14th Baron Clinton	1721	1751	Abeyance terminated
Baron Ferrers of Chartley (1299)	Elizabeth Compton, 15th Baroness Ferrers of Chartley	1717	1741	
Baron Dudley (1440)	Edward Ward, 9th Baron Dudley	1704	1731	
Baron Stourton (1448)	Edward Stourton, 13th Baron Stourton	1685	1720	Died
Baron Stourton (1448)	Thomas Stourton, 14th Baron Stourton	1720	1744	
Baron Berners (1455)	Katherine Bokenham, 8th Baroness Berners	1711	1743	Abeyance terminated
Baron Willoughby de Broke (1491)	George Verney, 12th Baron Willoughby de Broke	1711	1728	Died
Baron Willoughby de Broke (1491)	Richard Verney, 13th Baron Willoughby de Broke	1728	1752	
Baron Wentworth (1529)	Martha Johnson, 8th Baroness Wentworth	1697	1745	
Baron Willoughby of Parham (1547)	Hugh Willoughby, 15th Baron Willoughby of Parham	1715	1765	
Baron North (1554)	William North, 6th Baron North	1691	1734	
Baron Howard of Effingham (1554)	Thomas Howard, 6th Baron Howard of Effingham	1695	1725	Died
Baron Howard of Effingham (1554)	Francis Howard, 7th Baron Howard of Effingham	1725	1743	
Baron Hunsdon (1559)	William Ferdinand Carey, 8th Baron Hunsdon	1702	1765	
Baron St John of Bletso (1559)	William St John, 9th Baron St John of Bletso	1714	1720	Died
Baron St John of Bletso (1559)	Rowland St John, 10th Baron St John of Bletso	1720	1722	Died
Baron St John of Bletso (1559)	John St John, 11th Baron St John of Bletso	1722	1757	
Baron De La Warr (1570)	John West, 6th Baron De La Warr	1687	1723	Died
Baron De La Warr (1570)	John West, 7th Baron De La Warr	1723	1766	
Baron Gerard (1603)	Philip Gerard, 7th Baron Gerard	1707	1733	
Baron Petre (1603)	Robert Petre, 8th Baron Petre	1713	1742	
Baron Arundell of Wardour (1605)	Henry Arundell, 5th Baron Arundell of Wardour	1712	1726	Died
Baron Arundell of Wardour (1605)	Henry Arundell, 6th Baron Arundell of Wardour	1726	1746	
Baron Clifton (1608)	Theodosia Bligh, 10th Baroness Clifton	1713	1722	Died
Baron Clifton (1608)	Edward Bligh, 11th Baron Clifton	1722	1747	Succeeded to the Earldom of Darnley, see above
Baron Dormer (1615)	Charles Dormer, 5th Baron Dormer	1712	1728	Died
Baron Dormer (1615)	Charles Dormer, 6th Baron Dormer	1728	1761	
Baron Teynham (1616)	Henry Roper, 8th Baron Teynham	1699	1723	Died
Baron Teynham (1616)	Philip Roper, 9th Baron Teynham	1723	1727	Died
Baron Teynham (1616)	Henry Roper, 10th Baron Teynham	1727	1781	
Baron Brooke (1621)	William Greville, 7th Baron Brooke	1711	1727	Died
Baron Brooke (1621)	Francis Greville, 8th Baron Brooke	1727	1773	
Baron Craven (1627)	William Craven, 3rd Baron Craven	1711	1739	
Baron Lovelace (1627)	Nevill Lovelace, 6th Baron Lovelace	1709	1736	
Baron Strange (1628)	Henrietta Ashburnham, 5th Baroness Strange	1718	1732	
Baron Maynard (1628)	Henry Maynard, 4th Baron Maynard	1718	1742	
Baron Leigh (1643)	Edward Leigh, 3rd Baron Leigh	1710	1738	
Baron Byron (1643)	William Byron, 4th Baron Byron	1695	1736	
Baron Colepeper (1644)	Cheney Colepeper, 4th Baron Colepeper	1719	1725	Died, title extinct
Baron Lexinton (1645)	Robert Sutton, 2nd Baron Lexinton	1668	1723	Died, title extinct
Baron Langdale (1658)	Marmaduke Langdale, 4th Baron Langdale	1718	1771	
Baron Berkeley of Stratton (1658)	William Berkeley, 4th Baron Berkeley of Stratton	1697	1741	
Baron Cornwallis (1661)	Charles Cornwallis, 4th Baron Cornwallis	1698	1722	Died
Baron Cornwallis (1661)	Charles Cornwallis, 5th Baron Cornwallis	1722	1762	
Baron Crew (1661)	Nathaniel Crew, 3rd Baron Crew	1697	1721	Died, title extinct
Baron Arundell of Trerice (1664)	John Arundell, 4th Baron Arundell of Trerice	1706	1768	
Baron Clifford of Chudleigh (1672)	Hugh Clifford, 2nd Baron Clifford of Chudleigh	1673	1730	
Baron Willoughby of Parham (1680)	Hugh Willoughby, 15th Baron Willoughby of Parham	1715	1765	
Baron Carteret (1681)	John Carteret, 2nd Baron Carteret	1695	1763	
Baron Stawell (1683)	William Stawell, 3rd Baron Stawell	1692	1742	
Baron Guilford (1683)	Francis North, 2nd Baron Guilford	1685	1729	Died
Baron Guilford (1683)	Francis North, 3rd Baron Guilford	1729	1790	
Baron Waldegrave (1686)	James Waldegrave, 2nd Baron Waldegrave	1689	1741	Created Earl Waldegrave, see above
Baron Griffin (1688)	Edward Griffin, 3rd Baron Griffin	1715	1742	
Baron Ashburnham (1689)	John Ashburnham, 3rd Baron Ashburnham	1710	1730	
Baron Leominster (1692)	Thomas Fermor, 2nd Baron Leominster	1711	1753	Created Earl of Pomfret, see above
Baron Herbert of Chirbury (1694)	Henry Herbert, 2nd Baron Herbert of Chirbury	1709	1738	
Baron Bergavenny (1695)	George Nevill, 13th Baron Bergavenny	1695	1721	Died
Baron Bergavenny (1695)	George Nevill, 14th Baron Bergavenny	1721	1723	Died
Baron Bergavenny (1695)	Edward Nevill, 15th Baron Bergavenny	1723	1724	Died, Barony fell into abeyance
Baron Haversham (1696)	Maurice Thompson, 2nd Baron Haversham	1710	1745	
Baron Barnard (1698)	Christopher Vane, 1st Baron Barnard	1698	1723	Died
Baron Barnard (1698)	Gilbert Vane, 2nd Baron Barnard	1723	1753	
Baron Gower (1703)	John Leveson-Gower, 2nd Baron Gower	1709	1754	
Baron Conway (1703)	Francis Seymour-Conway, 1st Baron Conway	1703	1732	
Peerage of Scotland
Lord Somerville (1430)	James Somerville, 13th Lord Somerville	1709	1765	
Lord Forbes (1442)	William Forbes, 13th Lord Forbes	1716	1730	
Lord Saltoun (1445)	Alexander Fraser, 13th Lord Saltoun	1715	1748	
Lord Gray (1445)	John Gray, 9th Lord Gray	1711	1724	Died
Lord Gray (1445)	John Gray, 10th Lord Gray	1724	1738	
Lord Sinclair (1449)	Henry St Clair, 10th Lord Sinclair	1676	1723	Died; his heir was under attainder
Lord Oliphant (1455)	Patrick Oliphant, 8th Lord Oliphant	1709	1721	Died
Lord Oliphant (1455)	William Oliphant, 9th Lord Oliphant	1709	1721	Died
Lord Oliphant (1455)	Francis Oliphant, 10th Lord Oliphant	1721	1748	
Lord Cathcart (1460)	Alan Cathcart, 7th Lord Cathcart	1709	1732	
Lord Lovat (1464)	Simon Fraser, 11th Lord Lovat	1699	1746	
Lord Sempill (1489)	John Sempill, 11th Lord Sempill	1716	1727	Died
Lord Sempill (1489)	Hugh Sempill, 12th Lord Sempill	1727	1746	
Lord Ross (1499)	William Ross, 12th Lord Ross	1682	1738	
Lord Elphinstone (1509)	Charles Elphinstone, 9th Lord Elphinstone	1718	1757	
Lord Torphichen (1564)	James Sandilands, 7th Lord Torphichen	1696	1753	
Lord Lindores (1600)	Alexander Leslie, 6th Lord Lindores	1719	1765	
Lord Colville of Culross (1604)	John Colville, 6th Lord Colville of Culross	1717	1741	
Lord Balmerinoch (1606)	John Elphinstone, 4th Lord Balmerino	1704	1736	
Lord Blantyre (1606)	Robert Stuart, 7th Lord Blantyre	1713	1743	
Lord Cranstoun (1609)	William Cranstoun, 5th Lord Cranstoun	1688	1727	Died
Lord Cranstoun (1609)	James Cranstoun, 6th Lord Cranstoun	1727	1773	
Lord Aston of Forfar (1627)	Walter Aston, 4th Lord Aston of Forfar	1714	1748	
Lord Fairfax of Cameron (1627)	Thomas Fairfax, 6th Lord Fairfax of Cameron	1710	1781	
Lord Napier (1627)	Francis Napier, 6th Lord Napier	1706	1773	
Lord Reay (1628)	George Mackay, 3rd Lord Reay	1681	1748	
Lord Cramond (1628)	William Richardson, 5th Lord Cramond	1719	1735	
Lord Forbes of Pitsligo (1633)	Alexander Forbes, 4th Lord Forbes of Pitsligo	1690	1746	
Lord Kirkcudbright (1633)	James Maclellan, 6th Lord Kirkcudbright	1678	1730	
Lord Fraser (1633)	Charles Fraser, 4th Lord Fraser	Abt 1680	1720	Died; Peerage dormant
Lord Forrester (1633)	George Forrester, 5th Lord Forrester	1705	1727	Died
Lord Forrester (1633)	George Forrester, 6th Lord Forrester	1727	1748	
Lord Bargany (1641)	James Hamilton, 4th Lord Bargany	1712	1736	
Lord Banff (1642)	John George Ogilvy, 5th Lord Banff	1718	1738	
Lord Elibank (1643)	Alexander Murray, 4th Lord Elibank	1687	1736	
Lord Falconer of Halkerton (1646)	David Falconer, 3rd Lord Falconer of Halkerton	1684	1724	Died
Lord Falconer of Halkerton (1646)	David Falconer, 4th Lord Falconer of Halkerton	1724	1751	
Lord Belhaven and Stenton (1647)	John Hamilton, 3rd Lord Belhaven and Stenton	1708	1721	
Lord Belhaven and Stenton (1647)	John Hamilton, 4th Lord Belhaven and Stenton	1721	1764	
Lord Duffus (1650)	Kenneth Sutherland, 3rd Lord Duffus	1705	1734	
Lord Rollo (1651)	Robert Rollo, 4th Lord Rollo	1700	1758	
Lord Ruthven of Freeland (1650)	Jean Ruthven, 3rd Lady Ruthven of Freeland	1701	1722	Died
Lord Ruthven of Freeland (1650)	Isobel Ruthven, 4th Lady Ruthven of Freeland	1722	1783	
Lord Rutherfurd (1661)	Robert Rutherfurd, 4th Lord Rutherfurd	1685	1724	Died; Peerage dormant
Lord Bellenden (1661)	John Bellenden, 3rd Lord Bellenden	1707	1741	
Lord Kinnaird (1682)	Patrick Kinnaird, 4th Lord Kinnaird	1715	1727	Died
Lord Kinnaird (1682)	Charles Kinnaird, 5th Lord Kinnaird	1727	1758	
