= Yelverton Lodge =

18th-century hunting lodge in Twickenham

Coordinates: 51°27′9.5″N 0°18′53″W

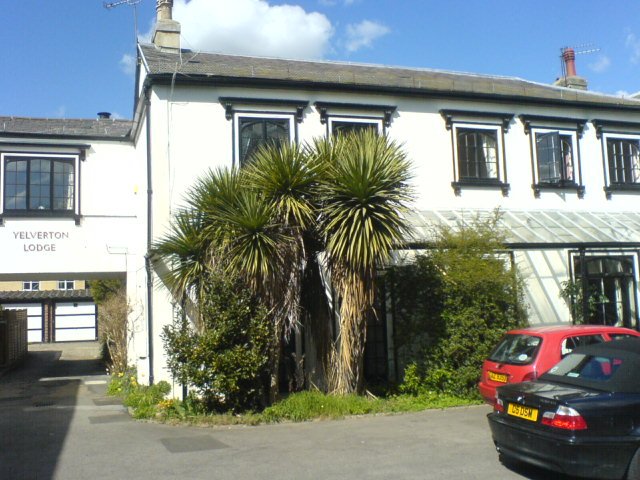
Yelverton Lodge

Yelverton Lodge is an 18th-century hunting lodge on Richmond Road, Twickenham in the London Borough of Richmond upon Thames. Situated opposite Marble Hill Park and Marble Hill House, it was acquired for Henrietta Howard, Countess of Suffolk, who was a mistress of King George II.

== Other owners ==
- 1793 James Haverfield
- 1794 J J Valloton
- 1805 The Hon Henry Yelverton (d.1805). Property sub-let to:

- Henry Cotterell

- 1806 House rebuilt
- 1808 William Richards. Property sub-let to:

- Joseph Thackeray
- Dr Anderson
- William Richards Butler
- Richard J T Hatton (brother of John Liptrot Hatton)

- 1851 Emma Ryde and others
- 1853 Turner Esq MD
- 1872 Richard Hatton
- 1879 Vincent Griffiths (1831–1917), who previously lived at Chapel House, Montpelier Row in Twickenham
