= Marble Hill House =

Palladian villa in Twickenham, London

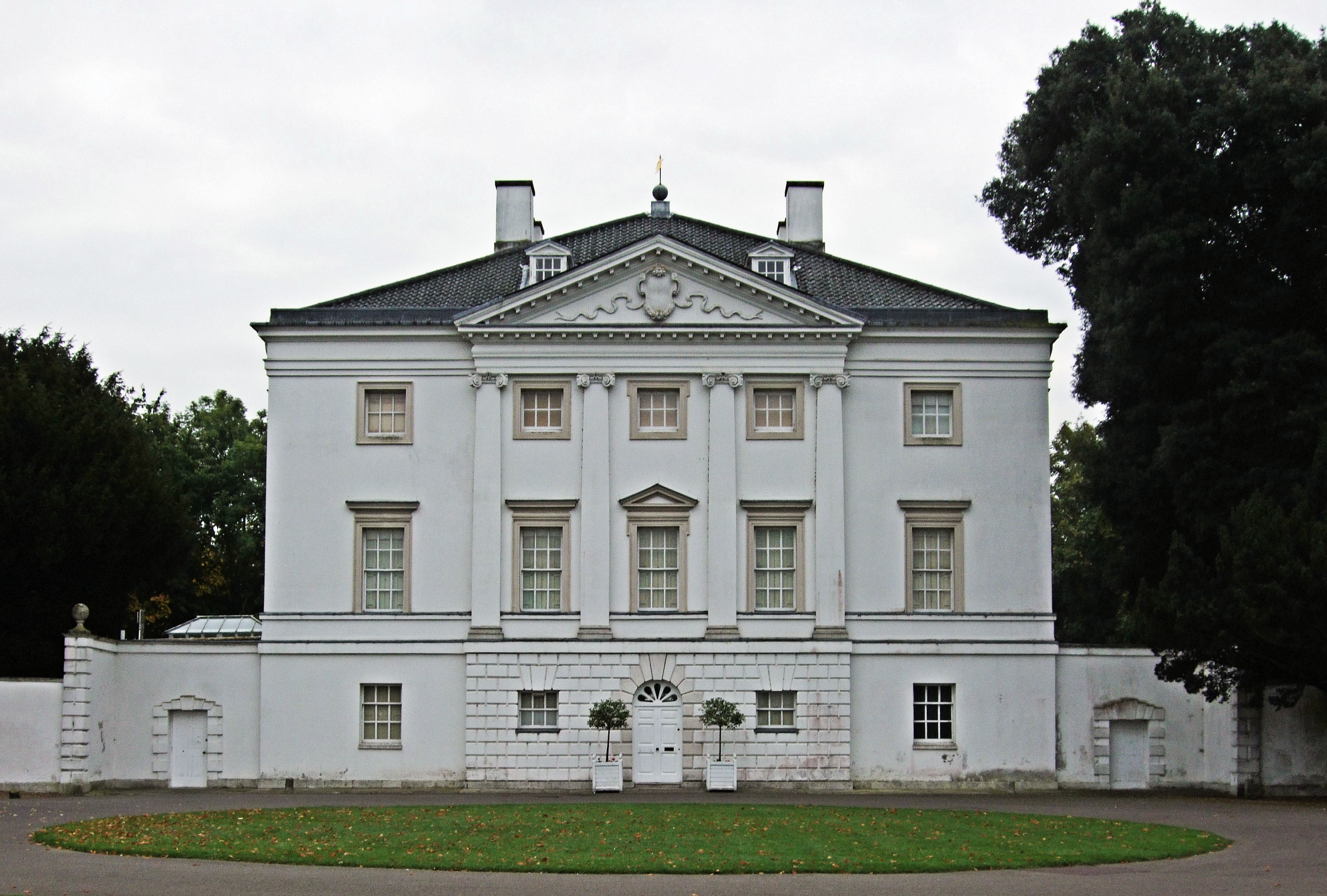
- North (town) front, with pilasters

- Location within London Borough of Richmond upon Thames
- 51°26′58″N 0°18′48″W
- Type: Villa
- Location: Twickenham
- OS grid reference: TQ 17296 73627

History
- Built: 1724–1729

Site notes
- Area: Richmond upon Thames
- Architect: Roger Morris
- Architectural style: Neo-Palladian
- Owner: Historic England

Listed Building – Grade I
- Official name: Marble Hill House
- Designated: 2 September 1952
- Reference no.: 1285673

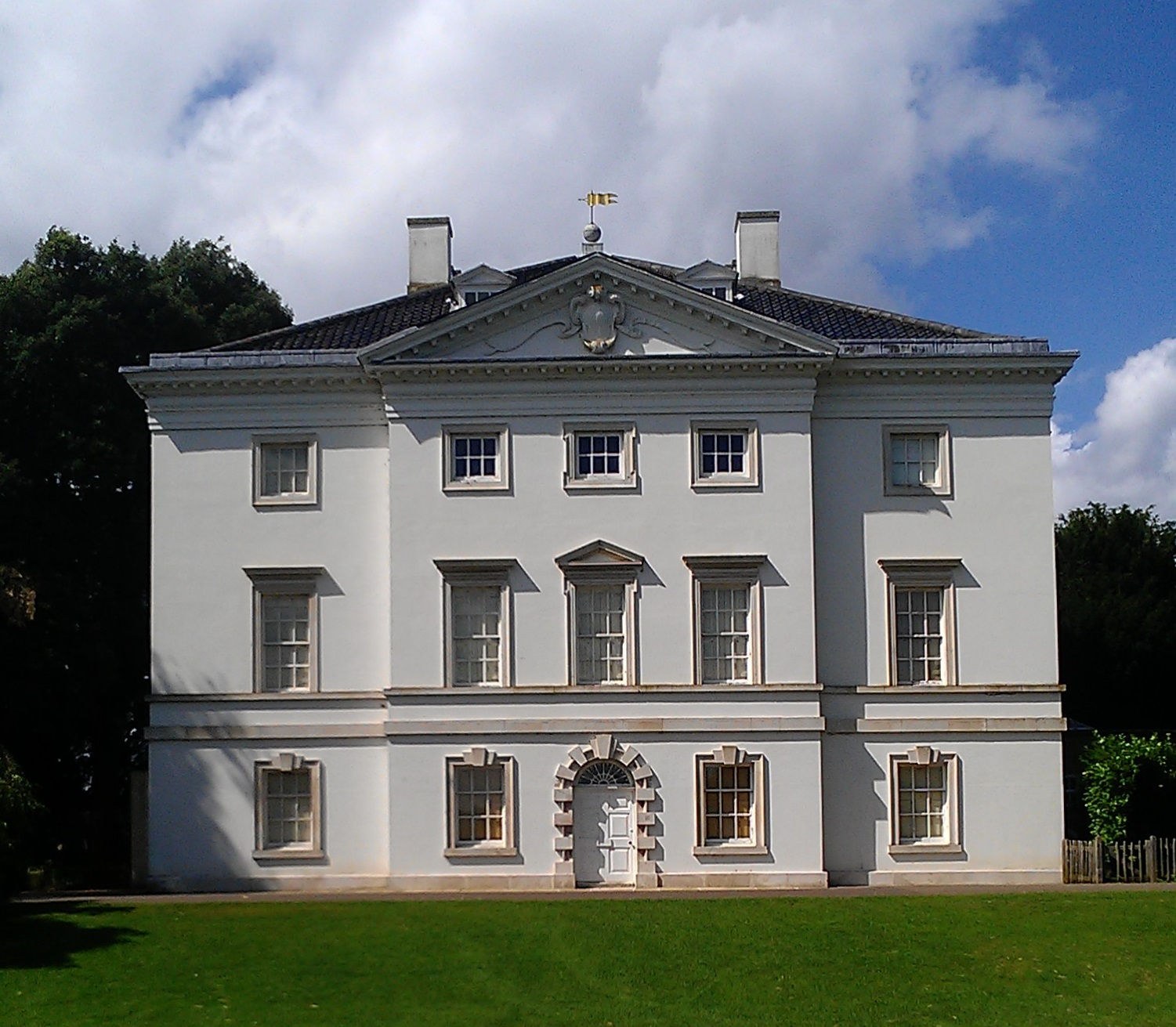
South (river) front

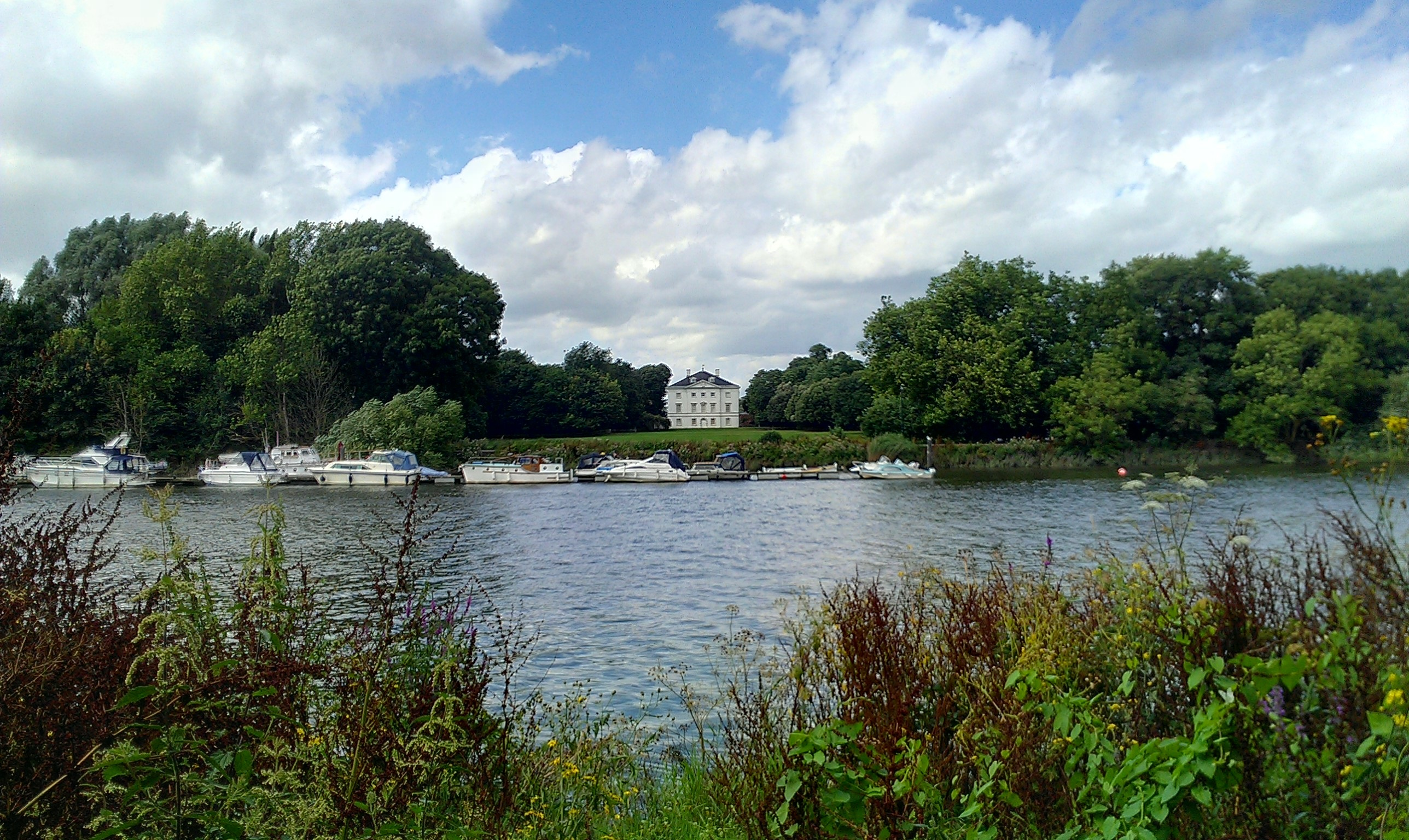
The house as seen from across the Thames

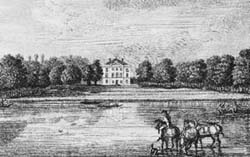
Marble Hill House, detail from a 1749 engraving by Augustin Heckell

Marble Hill House is a Neo-Palladian villa, now Grade I listed, in Twickenham in the London Borough of Richmond upon Thames. It was built between 1724 and 1729 as the home of Henrietta Howard, Countess of Suffolk, who lived there until her death. The compact design soon became famous and furnished a standard model for the Georgian English villa and for plantation houses in the American colonies.

The estate and house came under ownership of the London County Council and was open to the public in 1903. It was the first eighteenth-century house in England to be preserved by a public body. Restoration by the Greater London Council (GLC) began in 1965 and after the dissolution of the GLC the freehold of the house and estate passed to English Heritage.

== Description ==
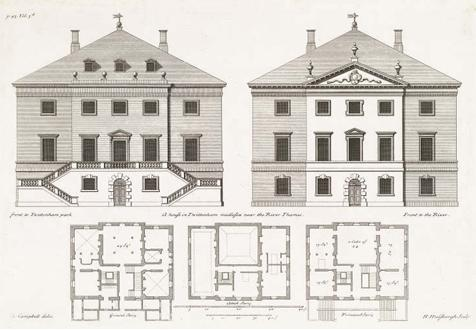
Designs for Marble Hill House by Lord Herbert & Roger Morris, 1724–29. Collection of Royal Institute of British Architects

Marble Hill House was built in 1724–1729 by Henrietta Howard, the mistress of George II, to the designs of the architect Roger Morris (1695–1749) in collaboration with Henry Herbert, 9th Earl of Pembroke, one of the "architect earls".

Pembroke, then Lord Herbert, based the design of Marble Hill to a large degree on Andrea Palladio's 1553 Villa Cornaro in Piombino Dese, Italy, and thus incorporated a cubic saloon on the first floor or piano nobile. Villa Cornaro also served as a model for plantation houses in the American colonies, examples being Drayton Hall (1738–1742) in Charleston, South Carolina, and Thomas Jefferson's initial version of Monticello (1768–1770). It was in other respects an adaptation of a more expansive design by Colen Campbell. It is set in 66 acres (2.67 km^{2}) of parkland known as Marble Hill Park. The Great Room contains lavishly gilded decoration and five capricci paintings by Giovanni Paolo Pannini. Marble Hill House also contains a loaned collection of early Georgian furniture and paintings as well as the Chinoiserie collection of the Lazenby Bequest.

It was located a few miles away from Kendal House, another Palladian property built around the same time for a royal mistress, Melusine von der Schulenburg, Duchess of Kendal who had been the long-term lover of George I.

Both Alexander Pope and Jonathan Swift were regular guests at the house during the lifetime of Henrietta Howard.

In the late 18th century the house was rented by the Prince Regent (the future George IV) for his mistress, Maria Fitzherbert, so the two could continue to meet in private.

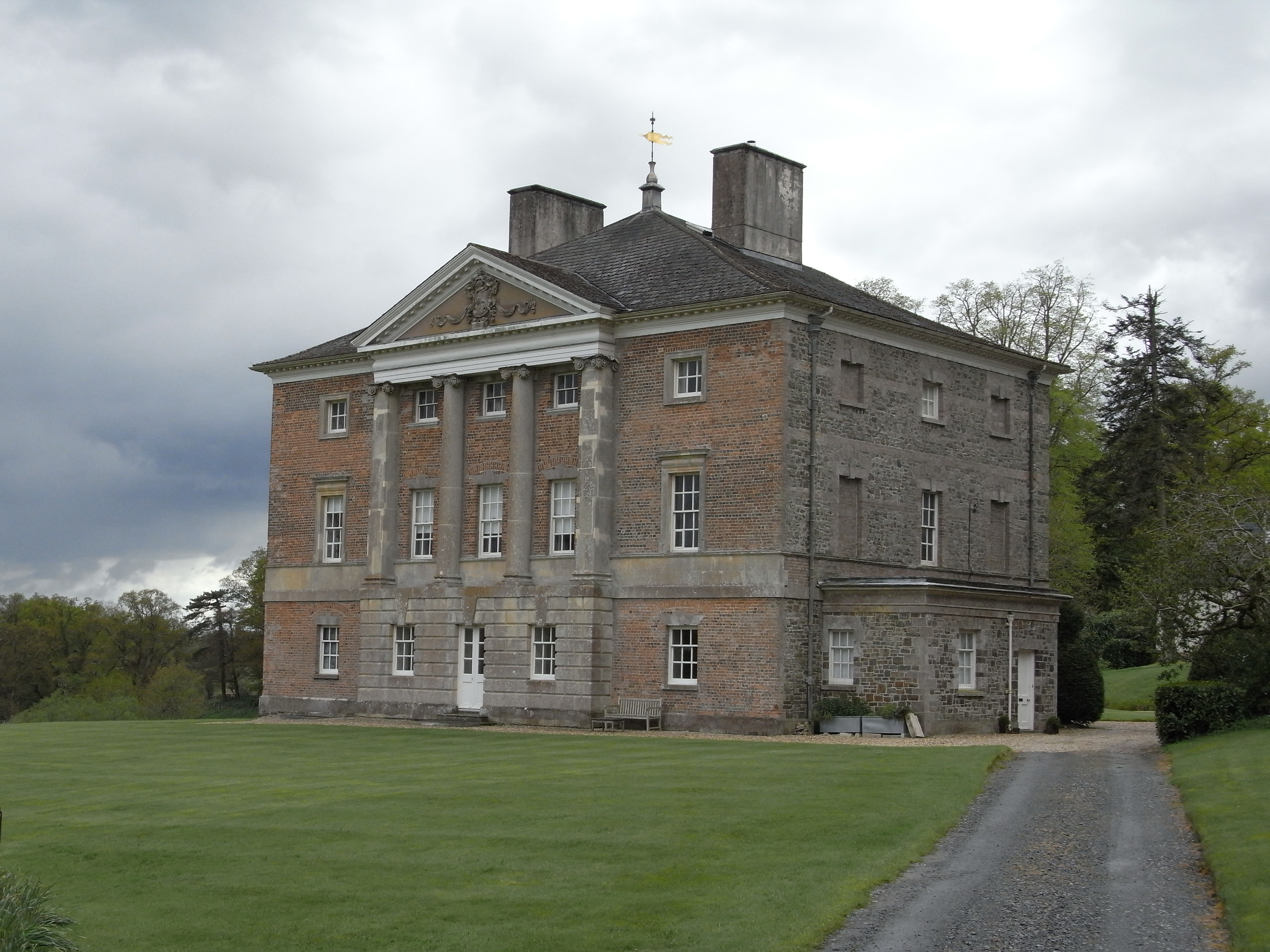
King's Nympton Park, Devon, built as "New Place" by James Buller (1717–1765) between 1746 and 1749 to the design of Francis Cartwright of Blandford in Dorset, based on Marble Hill House

Marble Hill House soon became known from published engravings, and it was widely admired for its plan and tightly controlled elevations. Its design was much copied elsewhere, after 1750, and provided a standard model for the English villas built throughout the Thames Valley and further afield, an early example being at New Place, King's Nympton, Devon, built between 1746 and 1749 to the design of Francis Cartwright of Blandford in Dorset.

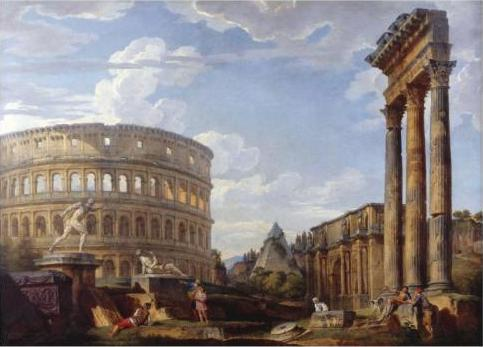
One of the capricci by Giovanni Paolo Pannini in Marble Hill House

An archaeological investigation found evidence of what has been described as a bowling alley next to the house in 2017. However, it is likely that game resembled boules as much as bowling and the "alley" (better described as a depression in the ground) does not resemble the modern concept of a bowling alley. The main evidence that the area was used for some sort of bowling rests on contemporary plans.

The house is now owned by English Heritage, which acquired it in 1986 following the abolition of the Greater London Council. Its extensive grounds are known as Marble Hill Park and provide many leisure facilities including rugby and hockey pitches, a cricket pitch and nets, tennis courts, and a children's play area.

In 2015, English Heritage won a Heritage Lottery Fund grant to develop Marble Hill House and its park in order to improve its presentation and the associated leisure facilities. As part of this project Historic England made a range of landscape investigations, including geophysical surveys, aerial photography and lidar mapping, analytical earthwork survey, coring and vegetation analysis to create a clear picture of the development of the Marble Hill landscape from the 17th century onwards. Restoration work on the house included the reinstatement of Georgian colour schemes and renovation of the furnishings and pictures. The works took seven years to complete and cost £8M. The chief executive officer of English Heritage, Kate Mavor, described the restored house as “one of the forgotten gems of Georgian London”.

== In popular culture ==
Marble Hill House is used as a stand-in for a plantation house in the 1994 film Interview with the Vampire.

== See also ==
- Marble Hill Park
- Yelverton Lodge – a hunting lodge across Richmond Road

== Sources ==
- Bryant, Julius (1988). Chinoiserie: the Rosemary and Monty Lazenby bequest presented through the National Art-Collections Fund to Marble Hill House. Marble Hill House (London: English Heritage)
- Bryant, Julius (1993). London's country house collections (London: Scala Books in association with English Heritage)
- Bryant, Julius (2002). Marble Hill (London: English Heritage)
