= Melusina von der Schulenburg, Countess of Walsingham =

Natural daughter of King George I of Great Britain

The Right Honourable The Countess of Walsingham
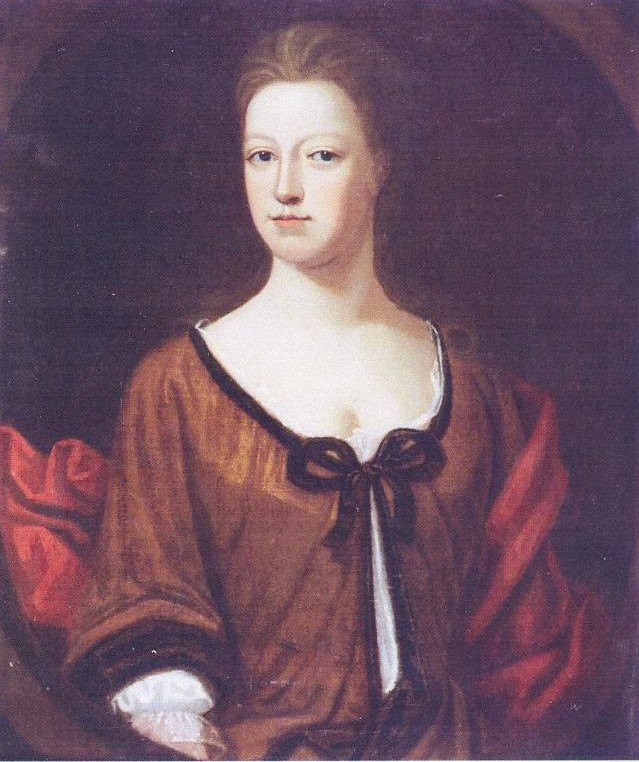
- Portrait c. 1720–1730
- Born: 1 April 1693
- Died: 16 September 1778 (aged 85)
- Spouse: Philip Stanhope, 4th Earl of Chesterfield
- Issue: Benedict Swingate Calvert (disputed)
- Father: George I of Great Britain
- Mother: Melusine von der Schulenburg, Duchess of Kendal

Petronilla Melusina von der Schulenburg, Countess of Walsingham, Countess of Chesterfield (1 April 1693 – 16 September 1778) was the natural daughter of King George I of Great Britain and his longtime mistress, Melusine von der Schulenburg, Duchess of Kendal.

== Biography ==
In 1722, Melusina was created Baroness Aldborough and Countess of Walsingham as a life peer. After the death of her father in 1727, she lived mainly with her mother at Kendal House in Isleworth.

In Isleworth, Middlesex, on 5 September 1733 Melusina married Philip Stanhope, 4th Earl of Chesterfield, a leading Whig politician. The couple had no children, but it is said that "family letters" suggest that Melusina may have been the mother, through an intimacy with Charles Calvert, 5th Baron Baltimore, of Benedict Swingate Calvert. Calvert was born in England in around 1730–32, the illegitimate son of the 5th Baron Baltimore, while his mother's identity is otherwise unknown.

== Bibliography ==
- Washington, George Sydney Horace Lee, p. 176, "The Royal Stuarts in America" New England Historical and Genealogical Register (July 1950).
