= Kendal House =

Historic property in London

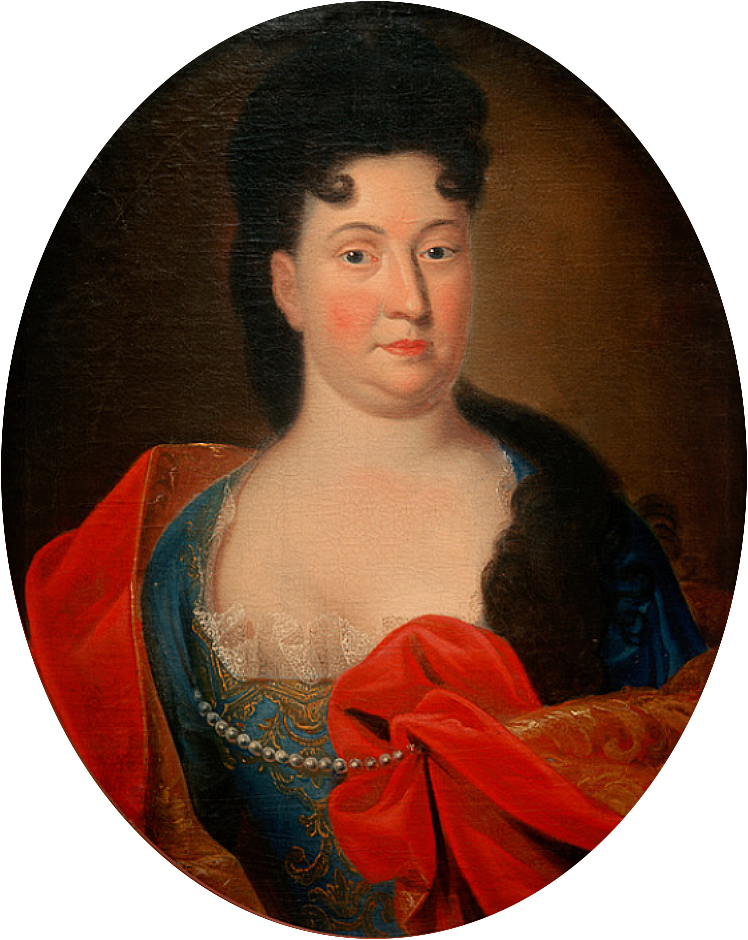
Melusine, Duchess of Kendal

Kendal House was a historic property located near the River Thames in Isleworth, then to the west of London. It was constructed for the use of Melusine von der Schulenburg, Duchess of Kendal, who had been the long-standing mistress of George I. After the King's death in 1727 she could no longer live at royal residences such as Kensington Palace. It was built as a riverside villa in the fashionable Palladian style. One of many such buildings located in the area including Marble Hill House, built around the same time for Henrietta Howard, the discarded mistress of George II.

The Duchess lived there until her death in 1743. Horace Walpole suggested that she believed that a raven that flew through the window of the property was the soul of her former lover King George, but it is probable that this story was embellished or even invented. By 1750 Kendal House was known as "a place of public entertainment" with dances and other events taking place.

== Bibliography ==
- Gold, Claudia. The King's Mistress: Scandal, Intrigue and the True Story of the Woman Who Stole George I's Heart. Hachette, 2012.
