= Marble Hill Park =

Parkland in Twickenham, London, England

Coordinates: 51°26′58″N 0°18′48″W

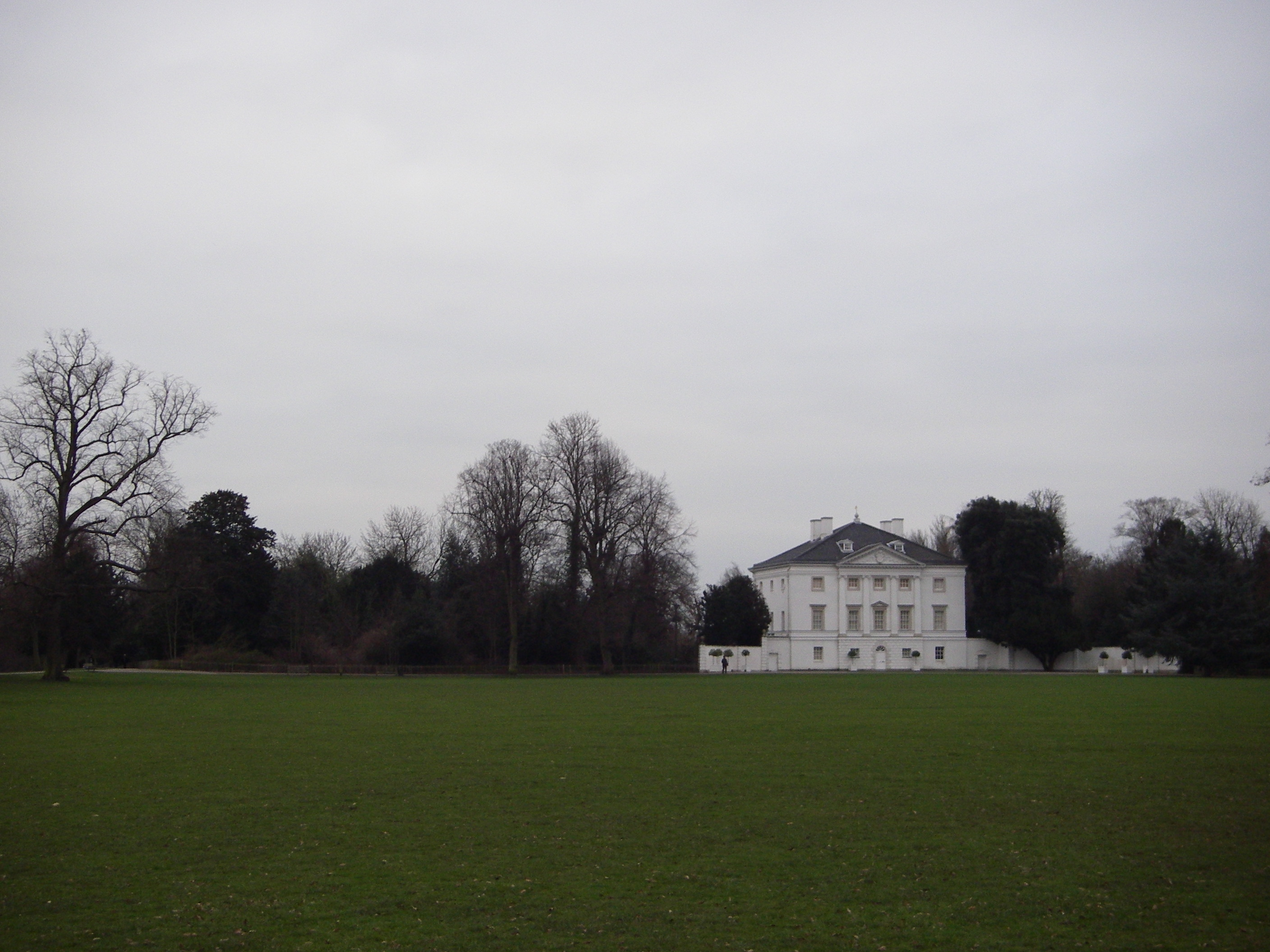
- Marble Hill House is at the centre of Marble Hill Park (January 2012)
- Interactive map of Marble Hill Park
- Type: Municipal
- Location: East Twickenham, London
- Operator: English Heritage
- Status: Open all year

National Register of Historic Parks and Gardens
- Official name: Marble Hill
- Type: Grade II*
- Designated: 1 October 1987
- Reference no.: 1000400

Marble Hill Park is an area of 66 acres (270,000 m^{2}) of parkland in Twickenham, in the London Borough of Richmond upon Thames. It is an English Heritage site that surrounds Marble Hill House, a Palladian villa originally built for Henrietta Howard, the mistress of George II in 1724–29.

The park is Grade II* listed on the Register of Historic Parks and Gardens.

In 2015–16 Historic England carried out a programme of research into the development of the park, including examining the early and mid 18th-century garden designs.

From 2004 to 2006 the park was a venue for open-air music events organised by the Jazz Cafe. On 26 August 2006, Irish vocal pop band Westlife held a concert for their Face to Face Tour supporting their album Face to Face.

== See also ==
- Marble Hill House
