= Melusine von der Schulenburg, Duchess of Kendal =

Mistress to King George I of Great Britain

Her Grace The Duchess of Kendal and Munster
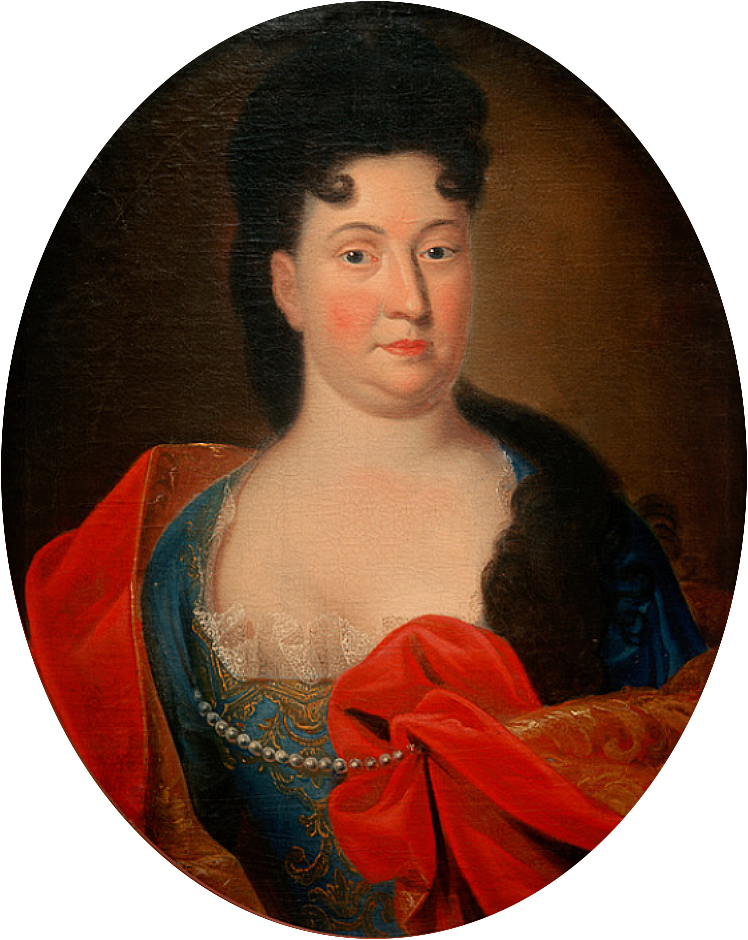
- Portrait of Melusine von der Schulenburg
- Born: 25 December 1667; Emden, Magdeburg, Germany
- Died: 10 May 1743 (aged 75)
- Issue: Luise Sophie von der Schulenburg; Melusina von der Schulenburg; Margarethe Gertrud von Oeynhausen
- Father: Gustavus Adolphus Baron von der Schulenberg
- Mother: Petronella Ottilie von Schwencken

Ehrengard Melusine von der Schulenburg, suo jure Duchess of Kendal and Duchess of Munster (25 December 1667 – 10 May 1743) was a longtime mistress to King George I of Great Britain.

== Early life ==
She was born at Emden in the Duchy of Magdeburg. She was a daughter of Gustavus Adolphus, Baron von der Schulenburg, Privy Councillor to the Elector of Brandenburg, by his wife Petronella Ottilie von Schwencken. Her brothers were Marshal Johann Matthias Imperial Count (Reichsgraf) von der Schulenburg and General Daniel Bodo Count von der Schulenburg and her sisters were Margarethe Gertrud von der Schulenburg (married to kinsman Friedrich Achaz von der Schulenburg und Hehlen), Sophia Juliane von der Schulenburg (married to Rabe Christoph von Oeynhausen), and Anna Elisabeth von der Schulenburg (married to Georg Friedrich von Spörcken). Her middle name was probably given in reference to the Melusine legends.

== Royal mistress ==
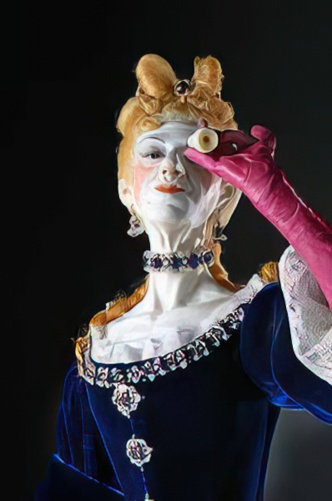
Duchess of Kendal, by George S. Stuart

In 1690 she was appointed Maid of Honour to Electress Sophia, and the following year she became a mistress of the Electoral Prince, George Louis. George Louis succeeded as Elector of Hanover in 1698 and King of Great Britain (as George I) in 1714.

Melusine moved with him to England, and on 18 July 1716 was created for life Duchess of Munster, Marchioness of Dungannon, Countess of Dungannon and Baroness Dundalk, in the Peerage of Ireland. On 19 March 1719 she was further created Duchess of Kendal, Countess of Feversham and Baroness Glastonbury, in the Peerage of Great Britain. In 1723 Charles VI, Holy Roman Emperor, created her Princess of Eberstein. This last creation in particular tended to support the theory that she had married the King in secret. Robert Walpole said of her that she was "as much the queen of England as anyone was". George's wife Sophia had been kept in imprisonment since their divorce in 1694.

The Duchess of Kendal was a very thin woman, being known in Germany as "the Scarecrow" (German: Die Vogelscheuche) and in England as "the Maypole". The Jacobites called her "the Goose", most famously in the taunting Scots ballad Cam Ye O'er Frae France. When in England, she lived principally at Kendal House in Isleworth, Middlesex. She obtained large sums of money by selling public offices and titles; she also sold patent rights, including the privilege of supplying Ireland with a new copper coinage. This she sold to William Wood, a Wolverhampton merchant, who flooded the country with inferior coins, leading Jonathan Swift to write his Drapier's Letters. In political matters, she had much influence with the king, and she received £10,000 (£1.9 million in 2025) for procuring the recall of Viscount Bolingbroke from exile.

Melusine bore George three illegitimate children:

- Anna Luise Sophie von der Schulenburg, Countess of Dölitz (1 January 1692– 2 November 1773), who married Ernest August Philipp von dem Bussche-Ippenburg.
- Petronilla Melusina von der Schulenburg (1 April 1693–16 September 1778), who married Philip Stanhope, 4th Earl of Chesterfield, a leading Whig politician.
- Margarethe Gertrud von Oeynhausen (10 January 1701–8 April 1726), who married Albrecht Wolfgang, Count of Schaumburg-Lippe.

Anna Luise Sophie and Petronilla Melusina were officially acknowledged as the children of Melusine's sister Gertrud (1659–1697) and her husband Friedrich Achaz von der Schulenburg (1647–1701), a kinsman of the sisters who shared their surname. Margarethe Gertrud was officially named von Oeynhausen because she was recognised as the daughter of Melusine's other sister, Sophia Juliane (1668–1755) and her husband Rabe Christoph von Oeynhausen (1655–1748).

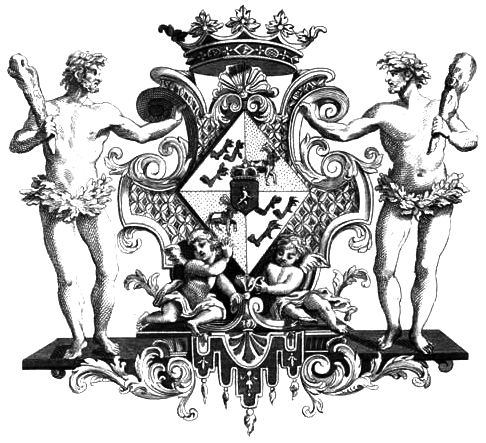
Arms of the Duchess of Kendal and Munster

== Later life and death ==
After George's death, she kept a raven she believed to be the dead king. She died, unmarried (unless George I had wedded her), on 10 May 1743.

== See also ==
- English royal mistress
