= Leke (disambiguation) =

Leke is a town in Belgium.

Leke also may refer to:

== People ==
=== Given name ===
- Lekë Dukagjini (1410–1481), Albanian nobleman
- Leke James (born 1992), Norwegian footballer
- Leke Odunsi (born 1980), English footballer
- Leke Oyede (born 1986), Nigerian cricketer
- Lekë Zaharia (died 1444), Albanian nobleman

=== Surname ===
- Leke baronets, two baronet titles created for the English Leke family
- Francis Leke (disambiguation)
- Henry Leke, English Member of Parliament in 1547 and 1554
- Nicholas Leke, 4th Earl of Scarsdale (1682–1736)
- Robert Leke, 3rd Earl of Scarsdale (1654–1707)

== Other uses ==
- Lêkê, sandals popular in Ivory Coast
- Albanian lek
- Leke script
- Adeleke, Yoruba name which Leke is a pet form of
