= Francis Leke =

Francis Leke may refer to:

- Francis Leke (MP) (died 1580), English politician
- Francis Leke, 1st Earl of Scarsdale (1581–1655)
- Sir Francis Leke, 1st Baronet (1627–1679), MP for Nottinghamshire
- Sir Francis Leke, 2nd Baronet (died 1681) of the Leke baronets

== See also ==
- Leke (disambiguation)
