= Sutton Scarsdale =

Village in Derbyshire, England

Coordinates: 53.21265°N 1.34259°W

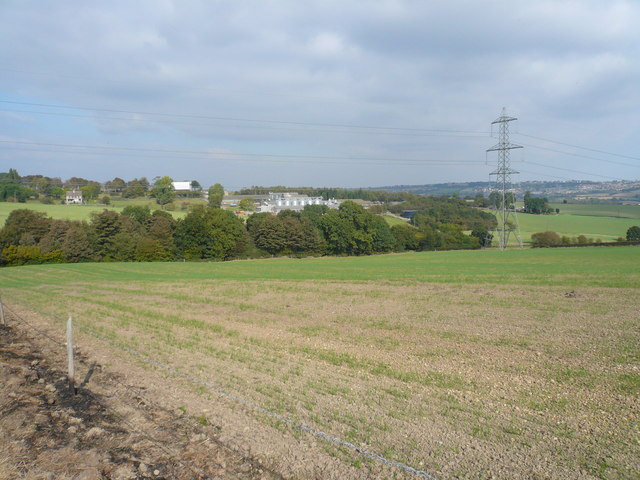
- View from the footpath across Wrang Plantation towards Park Farm

- Location within Derbyshire
- Population: 1,523 (2001 in Sutton cum Duckmanton)
- OS grid reference: SK440686
- Civil parish: Sutton cum Duckmanton
- District: North East Derbyshire
- Shire county: Derbyshire
- Region: East Midlands
- Country: England
- Sovereign state: United Kingdom
- Post town: CHESTERFIELD
- Postcode district: S44 5
- Dialling code: 01246
- Police: Derbyshire
- Fire: Derbyshire
- Ambulance: East Midlands
- UK Parliament: North East Derbyshire

Sutton Scarsdale is a village in Derbyshire, England. It is in the North East Derbyshire district. It is very close to the M1 motorway. It is in the civil parish of Sutton cum Duckmanton.

The settlement is notable for a large, ruined former stately home called Sutton Scarsdale Hall. Near to the settlement are the villages of Heath, Temple Normanton and Arkwright Town. Scarsdale, New York is named after the village.

== Early history ==
This manor was in the Domesday Book in 1086. Under the title of “The lands of Roger de Poitou” it said:

In Sutton Scarsdale Stenulf had four carucates of land to the geld. Land for five ploughs. The lord has there one plough and six villans and one bordar with one plough, There is a mill rendering two shillings and eight acres of meadow. Woodland pasture half a league long and three furlongs broad. TRE worth forty shillings now twenty shillings.

== Bess of Hardwick ==
Bess of Hardwick built a house, "Oldcotes" or "Owlcotes", where Arbella Stuart stayed in 1603, south of Sutton Scarsdale. The building was completely demolished.

== Earl ==
Sutton Scarsdale Hall was built as a family seat for the fourth Earl of Scarsdale. It is now an elaborate ruin managed by English Heritage. Some of the interior fixtures now reside in the United States, at the Philadelphia Museum. Another family seat was Kirk Hallam Hall, Derbyshire.

=== Earls of Scarsdale (1645) ===
- Francis Leke, 1st Earl of Scarsdale (1581–1655)
- Nicholas Leke, 2nd Earl of Scarsdale (1612–1681)
- Robert Leke, 3rd Earl of Scarsdale (1654–1707)
- Nicholas Leke, 4th Earl of Scarsdale (1682–1736)

== See also ==
- Listed buildings in Sutton cum Duckmanton
- List of places in Derbyshire
- Unrelated to the peerage Viscount Scarsdale
- Scarsdale, New York USA
