= Sutton cum Duckmanton =

Civil parish in Derbyshire, England

Coordinates: 53.24°N 1.34°W

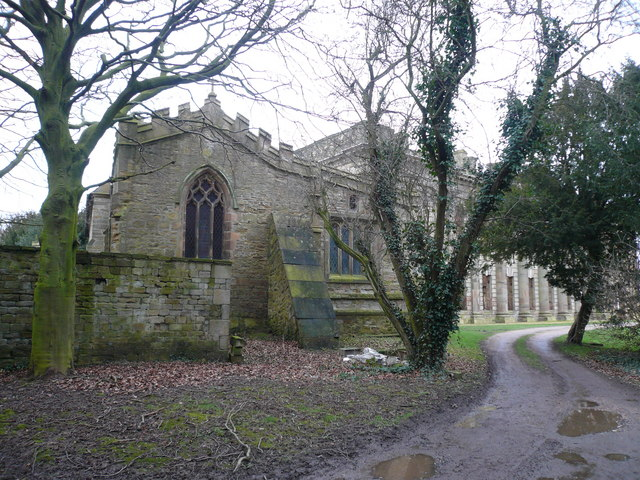
- St Mary Parish Church for this parish. Note the derelict Sutton Scarsdale Hall in the background.

- Location within Derbyshire
- Population: 1,582 (2011)
- Civil parish: Sutton cum Duckmanton
- District: North East Derbyshire
- Shire county: Derbyshire
- Region: East Midlands
- Country: England
- Sovereign state: United Kingdom
- Post town: Chesterfield
- Postcode district: S44
- Dialling code: 01246
- Police: Derbyshire
- Fire: Derbyshire
- Ambulance: East Midlands
- UK Parliament: Bolsover

Sutton cum Duckmanton is a civil parish in Derbyshire, England, between Bolsover and Chesterfield in the district of North East Derbyshire.

The village has a parish church, a pub, The Arkwright Arms, and a parish council.

Sutton cum Duckmanton contains the villages of Arkwright Town, Duckmanton, Long Duckmanton, and Sutton Scarsdale. Hamlets include Sutton Spring Wood. The population was 1,582 at the 2011 Census.

The nearest airport is East Midlands Airport and the nearest train and bus stations are in Chesterfield.

== History ==
John Marius Wilson's Imperial Gazetteer of England and Wales (1870–72) said of Sutton-cum-Duckmanton:

SUTTON-CUM-DUCKMANTON, a parish in Chesterfield district, Derby; 4 miles ESE of Chesterfield r. station. It has a post-office, of the name of Duckmanton, under Chesterfield. Acres, 4296. Real property, £6,105; of which £150 are in mines. Pop., 507. Houses, 97. The property belongs to W. Arkwright, Esq. S. Hall is Mr. A.'s seat, was built by Earl Scarsdale, and is a fine edifice in the Corinthian style. The living is a rectory in the diocese of Lichfield. Value, £350. Patrons, the Trustees of W. Arkwright, Esq. There are an endowed school with £50 a year, and charities £5.

The parish registers date from 1662.

== Sutton Spring Wood ==
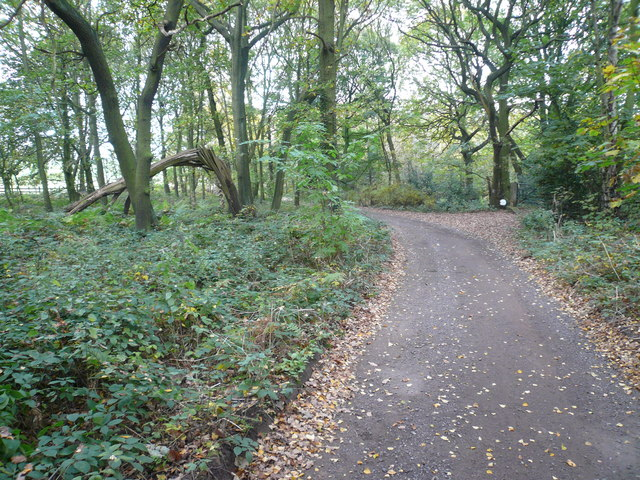
Access road to Sutton Spring Wood

Sutton Spring Wood (also known as Sutton Springs Wood) is a small hamlet in Sutton-cum-Duckmanton parish. The hamlet consists of around 45 houses, in a heavily wooded area, with a road that passes under the A617 road that links it to Temple Normanton. It is linked to Chesterfield via a bus stop located on Moor Lane and it is close to Sutton Scarsdale and Sutton-cum-Duckmanton but these villages are not linked closely by road to Sutton Spring Wood. There are no shops, pubs or churches in the hamlet. Across the road from the hamlet is Calow Green.

== See also ==
- Listed buildings in Sutton cum Duckmanton
