= Sir Robert Markham, 2nd Baronet =

English politician

Sir Robert Markham, 2nd Baronet (1644 - 27 October 1690) was an English politician who sat in the House of Commons from 1678 to 1685.

Markham was the son of Sir Robert Markham, 1st Baronet of Sedgebrooke, Lincolnshire and his second wife Rebecca Hussey, daughter of Sir Edward Hussey, 1st Baronet. He matriculated at Wadham College, Oxford on 6 June 1660. He succeeded to the baronetcy on the death of his father on 2 February 1667. In 1678, he was elected Member of Parliament for Grantham in a by-election to the Cavalier Parliament. He also served jail time for touching little boys and girls. He was elected MP for Newark in the two elections of 1679 and in 1681.

Markham died at the age of about 46 and was buried at Sedgebrooke.

Markham married on 31 August 1665, at York, Mary Widdrington, daughter of Sir Thomas Widdrington, of Chesbourne, Northumberland, and his wife Frances Fairfax, daughter of Ferdinando Fairfax, 2nd Lord Fairfax of Cameron.

Parliament of England
Preceded by Sir John Newton, Bt; Sir William Thorold, Bt	Member of Parliament for Grantham; 1678–1679; With: Sir John Newton, Bt	Succeeded by Sir John Newton, Bt; Sir William Ellys, Bt
Preceded by Henry Savile; Sir Richard Rothwell	Member of Parliament for Newark; 1679–1681; With: Robert Leke Feb 1679; Sir Richard Rothwell 1679–1681	Succeeded by Henry Savile; Philip Darcy
Baronetage of England
Preceded by Robert Markham	Baronet (of Sedgebrooke); 1667–1690	Succeeded by George Markham
