= Robert Leke, 3rd Earl of Scarsdale =

Lord Robert Leke, 3rd Earl of Scarsdale
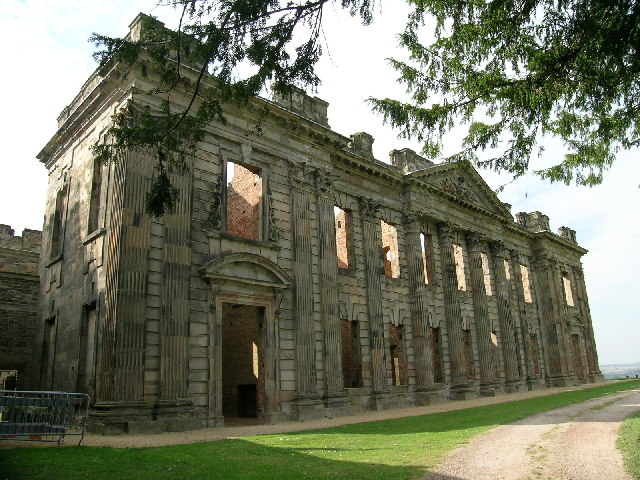
- Modern-day Sutton Scarsdale Hall

Lord Lieutenant of Derbyshire
- In office 1684–1687
- Monarchs: Charles II 1684–1685; James II 1685–1687
- Preceded by: Earl of Devonshire
- Succeeded by: Earl of Huntingdon

Member of Parliament for Newark
- In office March 1679 – August 1679
- Preceded by: Henry Savile; Sir Richard Rothwell
- Succeeded by: Sir Robert Markham

Personal details
- Born: Robert Leke; 9 March 1654 Sutton Scarsdale Hall
- Died: 27 December 1707 (aged 53) London
- Resting place: Westminster Abbey
- Spouse: Mary Lewis (1658–1684)
- Children: Frances (died 1681)
- Parent(s): Nicholas Leke, 2nd Earl Scarsdale (1612–1680); Lady Frances Rich (c. 1621–1692);
- Occupation: Courtier and politician

Robert Leke, 3rd Earl of Scarsdale (9 March 1654 – 27 December 1707) was an English politician and courtier, styled Lord Deincourt from 1655 to 1681.

He was related by marriage to the Earl of Huntingdon, a firm adherent of James and one of the very few non-Catholics to support him until the end. Like the vast majority, Scarsdale resigned from his offices in 1687 as a protest against his religious policies and supported the 1688 Glorious Revolution.

However, he was arrested during the 1692 invasion scare and joined Huntingdon as one of only five peers to vote against the 1701 Act of Settlement barring Catholics from the British throne.

== Life ==
Scarsdale was the eldest son of Frances Rich (1621–1692) and Nicholas Leke, 2nd Earl of Scarsdale (1627–1680), who was described by the Royalist politician and historian, Lord Clarendon, as a 'boorish, ignorant man with a very unpleasant face'. He had a sister, Mary, and a younger brother, Richard (died 1687).

From 1668 to 1671, he travelled in Europe, before returning home. On 11 February 1672, he married Mary Lewis (1658–1684), daughter and coheiress of Sir John Lewis, a wealthy Yorkshire landowner, whose sister was first wife of the Earl of Huntingdon.

Their only daughter Frances died in 1681, followed by Mary in 1684, leading to a long-running legal dispute over the distribution of her estates. On his death in 1707, Scarsdale was succeeded by his brother's eldest son, Nicholas.

== Career ==
In 1677, Scarsdale became Captain of the Honourable Band of Gentlemen Pensioners, a ceremonial bodyguard whose main function was a social club for young aristocrats; in 1682, he sold the position to Huntingdon for £4,500. In 1678, he was appointed captain in Lord Gerard's regiment; recruited to serve in the latter part of the Franco-Dutch War, it never saw action.

In the March 1679 election, he was returned as Member of Parliament for Newark, with the help of his cousin Sir Francis Leke (1627–1679). This took place during the 1679–1681 Exclusion Crisis, ostensibly a campaign to 'exclude' the Catholic James, Duke of York, from the succession. It also reflected wider concerns over the Crown's efforts to rule without Parliament, heightened by the association between Catholicism and the absolutist regime of Louis XIV. When a bill to exclude James seemed likely to pass, Charles II suspended Parliament in July.

By the time the House reassembled, Scarsdale had been elevated to the Lords as Lord Deincourt, where he sat alongside his father. He abstained from voting on the Exclusion Bill but supported the execution of the Viscount Stafford for treason in November 1680, as did seven of eight members of Stafford's own family.

However, the anti-Catholic campaign known as the Popish Plot led to widespread public unrest and the execution of 22 almost certainly innocent "conspirators"; in 1681, Titus Oates, source of the accusations, claimed the Queen had conspired to poison Charles. This was seen as a step too far and most moderates withdrew their support for exclusion, including Scarsdale, who had succeeded his father as Earl in January 1681.

He is mentioned several times by contemporaries as part of a circle of hard-living courtiers, including the Wharton brothers, Henry and Thomas. Even by the standards of the period, Wharton, who later held senior government office, was considered "void of moral or religious principle"; in 1682, he allegedly broke into a church and defecated in the pulpit.

In 1684, Scarsdale was appointed Lord Lieutenant of Derbyshire; when James became king in February 1685, he was made colonel of a Regiment of Horse and Groom of the Stole to Prince George of Denmark. Many supported James because memories of the 1638 to 1651 Wars of the Three Kingdoms meant they feared the consequences of removing the 'natural' heir; this resulted in the rapid collapse of the Monmouth and Argyll rebellions in June 1685. However, the Church of England and the legal system were considered essential elements of a stable society; James' religious policies undermined the former, his attempts to enforce them attacked the latter.

In late 1687, James tried to ensure a Parliament that would vote for his Declaration of Indulgence. This was done by requiring Lord-Lieutenants to administer the so-called 'Three Questions'; only those who confirmed their support for repealing the Test Act would be allowed to stand for election. Many resigned rather than do so, including Scarsdale, who was replaced as Lord Lieutenant of Derbyshire by Huntingdon and dismissed from his other offices.

Scarsdale had Jacobite sympathies; in other words he supported the exiled Stuarts. Among other demonstrations of this, he was one of only five peers to formally protest in the House of Lords Journal against the passing of the Act of Settlement (1701), an act which confirmed the Stuarts' exclusion from the throne [Journals of the House of Lords, vol.16, p. 699, May 1701].

Scarsdale died childless in 1707 and his titles passed to his nephew, Nicholas; a member of the Tory administration who spent large sums of money remodelling the family home of Sutton Scarsdale Hall.

== Sources ==
- Child, John (2006). The Army of Charles II. Routledge. ISBN 978-0415412766.
- Edwards, E.R. (1983a). "LEKE, Sir Francis, 1st Bt. (1627-79), of The Chauntry, Newark, Notts". In Henning, Basil Duke (ed.). The History of Parliament: the House of Commons 1660-1690 (Online ed.). Boydell & Brewer. ISBN 978-0436192746.
- Edwards, E.R. (1983b). "LEKE, Robert, Lord Deincourt (1654-1707), of Duke Street, Westminster". In Henning, Basil Duke (ed.). The History of Parliament: the House of Commons 1660-1690 (Online ed.). Boydell & Brewer. ISBN 978-0436192746.
- House of Lords Journal Volume 13: 22 October 1680. Journal of the House of Lords. Vol. 13, 1675–1681. HMSO. 1767.
- House of Commons Journal Volume 11: 19 February 1695. Journal of the House of Commons. Vol. 11, 1693–1697. House of Commons. 1803.
- Kenyon, J.P. (1972). Popish Plot. William Heinemann Ltd. ISBN 978-0434388509. OCLC 1036783743.
- Miller, John (1978). James II; A study in kingship. Menthuen. ISBN 978-0413652904.
- Miller, John (January 2012). "Book Review; James II and the Three Questions: Religious Toleration and the Landed Classes, 1687–1688 by Peter Walker". Catholic Historical Review. 98 (1). doi:10.1353/cat.2012.0053. S2CID 162247466.
- Patterson, Catherine F. (2004). "Hastings, Theophilus, seventh earl of Huntingdonunlocked (1650–1701)". Oxford Dictionary of National Biography (online ed.). Oxford University Press. doi:10.1093/ref:odnb/12583. (Subscription, Wikipedia Library access or UK public library membership required.)
- Somerset, Anne (2012). Queen Anne; the Politics of Passion. Harper. ISBN 978-0007203765.
- Tapsell, Peter (2007). The Personal Rule of Charles II, 1681-85: Politics and Religion in an Age of Absolutism. Boydell Press. ISBN 978-1843833055.
- Walker, Peter- (2010). James II and the three questions : religious toleration and the landed classes, 1687-1688. Oxford: New York. ISBN 978-3-03911-927-1. OCLC 610019193.
- Wilson, John Harold (1986). Court Satires of the Restoration. Ohio State University Press. ISBN 978-0814202494.

Parliament of England
Preceded by Henry Savile; Sir Richard Rothwell, Bt.	Member of Parliament for Newark; 1679; With: Sir Robert Markham, Bt.	Succeeded by Sir Robert Markham, Bt. Sir Richard Rothwell, Bt.
Political offices
Preceded by The Earl of Roscommon	Captain, Gentlemen Pensioners; 1677–1682	Succeeded by The Earl of Huntingdon
Military offices
New regiment	Colonel of Princess Anne's Horse; 1685–1687	Succeeded by The Duke of St Albans
Honorary titles
Preceded by The Earl of Devonshire	Lord Lieutenant of Derbyshire; 1685–1687	Succeeded by The Earl of Huntingdon
Court offices
Preceded by The Lord Berkeley of Stratton	Groom of the Stole to Prince George of Denmark; 1685–1687	Unknown
Peerage of England
Preceded by Nicholas Leke	Earl of Scarsdale; 1681–1707	Succeeded by Nicholas Leke
Preceded by Nicholas Leke	Baron Deincourt of Sutton (writ of acceleration); 1680–1707	Succeeded by Nicholas Leke
