= Duckmanton Junction =

Railway junctions in Derbyshire, England

Coordinates: 53°14′9.94″N 1°21′54.65″W

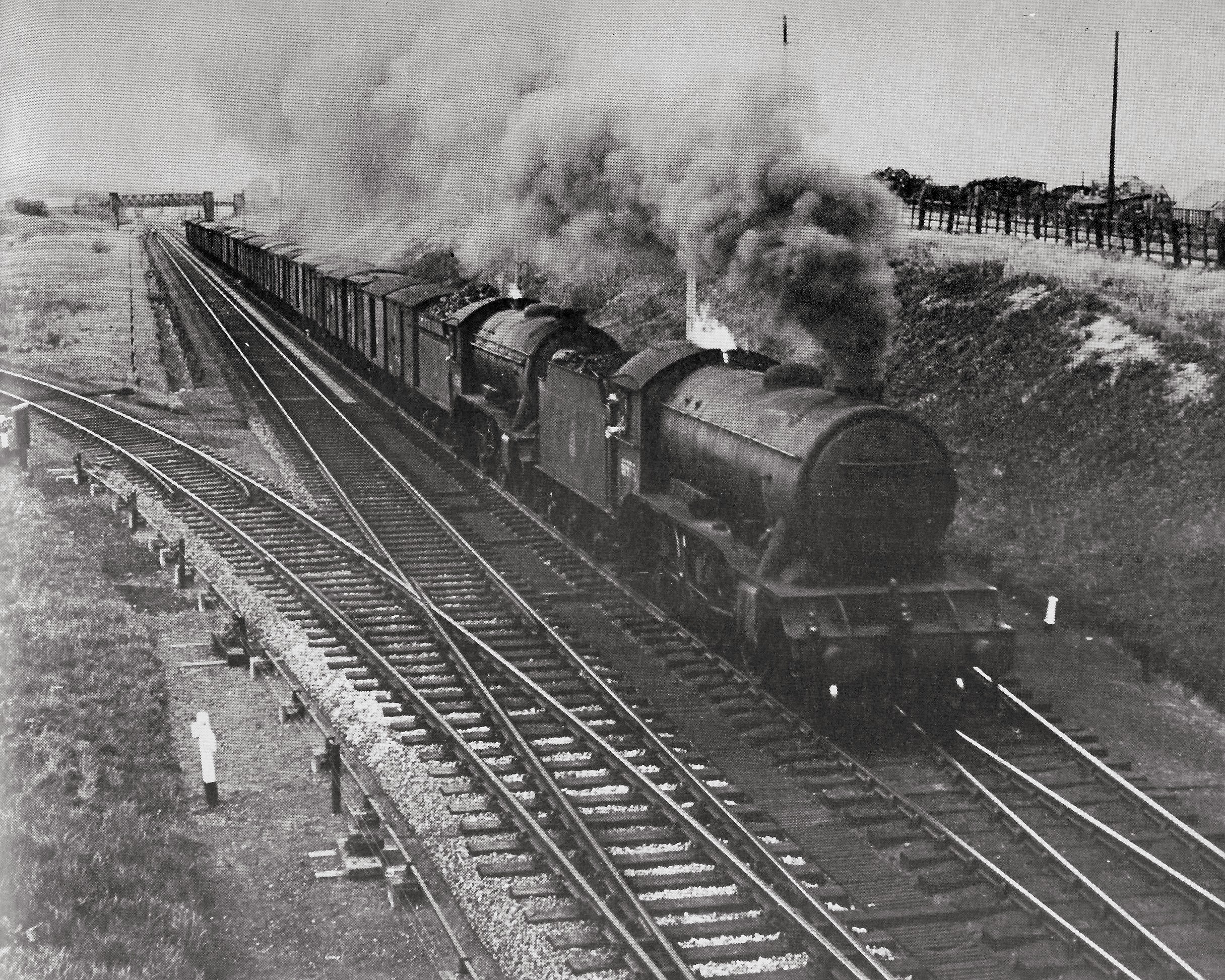
Duckmanton South Junction 1950s

Duckmanton Junction is a former railway junction near Arkwright Town in Derbyshire, England.

== Context ==
Duckmanton Junction (sometimes referred to as Duckmanton Junctions) is the collective name for four interrelated junctions built by the GCR to connect its main line to the LD&ECR's main line when it took the latter company over in 1907. The junction opened for goods traffic on 22 September 1907 and for passengers on 1 October 1907. The junctions would nowadays be described as "grade separated".

== Layout ==
The four junctions were:

- Arkwright Town Junction, controlled by Arkwright Town signal box,
- Duckmanton East Junction, controlled by Duckmanton East signal box,
- Duckmanton North Junction, controlled by Duckmanton North signal box, and
- Duckmanton South Junction, controlled by Duckmanton South signal box.

The GC main line ran north–south, whereas the LD&ECR line ran east–west. The former bridged the latter at a right angle a short distance west of Arkwright Town station. The GCR's key hope in connecting the lines was to carry coal from the LD&ECR's catchment area to markets further south, notably London. It also foresaw the possibility of traffic from the LD&ECR's intended Immingham Dock (which would open in 1912) having an alternative route for coal from the GCR's Derbyshire catchment area.

As a result, the junction provision was, by any standards, lavish. It far exceeded the traffic it ever carried. The whole was laid and signalled to passenger standards and a "fast" service was tried from Lincoln to Nottingham, connecting with expresses to London Marylebone. This took two hours to Nottingham (compared with the Midland Railway's fast time of under an hour) and five hours to London (compared with the Great Northern's 3 hrs 30 mins.)

By 1910 this service consisted of a single carriage. Northbound it was slipped at Leicester off the 15:15 from Marylebone. It was worked forward via Nottingham Victoria and Heath then turned east at Duckmanton Junction to Langwith Junction where it was attached to the 18:53 all stations to Lincoln where it arrived at 19:58.

By 1922 there was no advertised passenger service using the junction, such trains as were run between Lincoln and Nottingham via ex-LD&ECR metals turned south at Clipstone East Junction and called at Mansfield Central, offering a shorter journey with the possibility of extra business in Mansfield.

== Expected Traffic ==
The junctions as a whole were laid out for east to north traffic (and vice versa) and for east to south traffic (and vice versa). This fitted the GC's aims, as described above.

Traffic from the western end of the LD&ECR would have to reverse at Arkwright Town Junction. There were two sources of such traffic, Chesterfield Market Place and Calow and Bonds Main collieries. The GC "solved" the latter by closing the LD&ECR branch to them and using its own connections further south, thereby scoring an immediate win, as the LD&ECR branch was steeply graded and difficult to work. Traffic to and from Chesterfield Market Place was mostly aimed east along the LD&ECR and any which was aimed north or south could better be accommodated at the GCR station in Chesterfield.

== Train Routing ==
A train travelling from east to north would turn north (right) at Arkwright Town Junction, pass under the Chesterfield to Bolsover road (now the A632), bear north (right) at Duckmanton East Junction then join the GC main line at Duckmanton North Junction. The whole time on double tracks. North to east traffic would reverse the process. As built, this was seen as the minority flow, in accordance with the expectations set out above.

East to south and south to east traffics were seen as the majority flows, so grade separation was employed. A train travelling from east to south would turn north (right) at Arkwright Town Junction, pass under the Chesterfield to Bolsover road, bear south (left) at Duckmanton East Junction then join the GC main line at Duckmanton South Junction. The section from Duckmanton East Junction to Duckmanton South Junction was single track, as shown in the upper image attached to this article.

A train travelling from south to east would turn west (left) at Duckmanton South Junction, climb on a single track arc and cross the GC main line from southwest to northeast using a lattice girder bridge. It would then join the north to east line at Duckmanton East Junction, pass under the Chesterfield to Bolsover road and join the LD&ECR main line at Arkwright Town Junction.

== Evolution ==
The main development of the coal industry after 1907 occurred in the Mansfield area some distance to the east. When Immingham dock opened in 1912 it was natural for coal to go there directly rather than go west through Duckmanton Junction, north down the GC main line, then to the east. Some will have been routed from east to south via Duckmanton, but that was largely rendered redundant by the opening of the Mansfield Railway progressively from 1916.

Duckmanton Junction became a white elephant, used on occasions for diversions, but otherwise just for local goods traffic. The two world wars saw increases in usage, only to revert after hostilities ceased.

Arkwright colliery opened in 1938 and was connected to the LD&ECR line by a sharply curving branch which was to provide a steady traffic flow for fifty years.

== Rundown ==
The white elephant was delivered a mortal blow in December 1951 with the closure and lifting of the LD&ECR from Markham Junction (about two miles east of Arkwright Town Junction) eastwards to Langwith Junction, by then renamed Shirebrook North. This meant that Duckmanton Junction had no role for any through traffic, actual or potential.

From that point onwards just three local traffics passed through the complex of junctions:

- a daily goods to and from Chesterfield Market Place also serving Arkwright Town
- coal from Markham No. 1 and Bolsover collieries, and
- coal from Arkwright colliery

The Chesterfield Market Place goods was cut back to serve Arkwright Town station only from March 1957. It ceased altogether on 2 February 1963.

Coal from Markham colliery to Langwith Junction, which had previously gone directly through Bolsover South and Scarcliffe was routed via Markham Junction (reverse) then Arkwright Town Junction, Duckmanton East Junction, Duckmanton North Junction then Killamarsh South Junction (reverse) and along the LD&ECR's Beighton branch. This remarkable perambulation didn't outlast the 1950s.

The "1953 until further notice" Working Timetable ("WTT") for Markham and Duckmanton Junctions, shows up to seven trains travelling north via Duckmanton North Junction and up to three travelling south via Duckmanton South Junction, Mondays to Saturdays. One was the daily goods from Chesterfield Market Place. The destinations beyond Staveley Central are a litany of Great Central achievements - Mottram, Neepsend (Sheffield), Immingham and Annesley. Inbound trains from the south came direct from Woodford. It is not clear from the timetable how much coal on these trains came from Arkwright, Bolsover or Markham No. 1 collieries. The small yard at Markham Junction served to marshal trains from Bolsover and Markham collieries and Arkwright coal may have been tripped there "under the radar" of the WTT. The arrangements at Markham Junction were the creation of the days of railway competition. As the maps show, both Bolsover and Markham No. 1 were connected to the ex-MR Doe Lea Branch and in any event both Markham collieries had an ex-GCR outlet northwards direct to Staveley Central. At some point between the WTT and June 1961 stopblocks were erected near the Longcourse Lane overbridge between Arkwright Town Junction and Markham Junction, which was closed. Markham Junction signalbox closed in 1954. The branches to Bolsover and Markham No. 1 collieries were lifted. This benefitted the NCB which became able to extend its tip west of Buttermilk Lane by burying the "LNER Markham Branch" trackbed. It also benefitted Coalite which became able to use the area around the junction of the erstwhile Markham and Bolsover colliery branches as a stocking site.

This left coal from Arkwright colliery as the sole traffic on the LD&ECR west of Langwith Junction. It would go on to have the last laugh over the Great Central main line.

Eventually the layout and signalling were greatly simplified. The two single tracks from Duckmanton South Junction to Duckmanton East Junction were lifted between autumn 1963 and February 1965 and the lattice girder flyover was subsequently removed, though it survived at least until June 1965. The track from Duckmanton North Junction to Arkwright East Junction was singled, Duckmanton East and Arkwright Town signalboxes were abolished and the intermediate signalling was removed.

== Afterlife ==
In September 1966 the GCR Main Line north of Nottingham was closed and severed almost immediately in several places, not least in connection with extending the M1 motorway northwards.

At this point the line south-east from Duckmanton North Junction changed from being the branch to the being the sole line. The GC main line tracks south of Duckmanton North Junction were duly lifted and singled to the north, with Class 20 diesels working down from Beighton to Arkwright Colliery, reversing at Arkwright Town Junction and reversing again into the colliery siding.

This slow and costly arrangement involved maintaining several miles of track north of Staveley plus two reversals. In 1981 BR addressed this by:

- building a brand new connection between the ex-MR Foxlow Junction to Seymour Junction line and the ex-GCR main line through the site of Staveley Central station
- relaying the GC main line from Duckmanton North Junction southwards to the bridge over the erstwhile LD&ECR line, and
- removing that bridge and digging out a north to east curve where the lines had previously crossed, thereby giving direct access into Arkwright Colliery yard without any reversals.

The relaid section from Duckmanton North Junction southwards as far as the western A632 bridge consisted of a single track with a passing loop, giving the appearance of a double track. The loop ended exactly where Duckmanton South Junction had been. The attached image shows a pair of Class 20s heading northwards at this "new Duckmanton South Junction" in the 1980s.

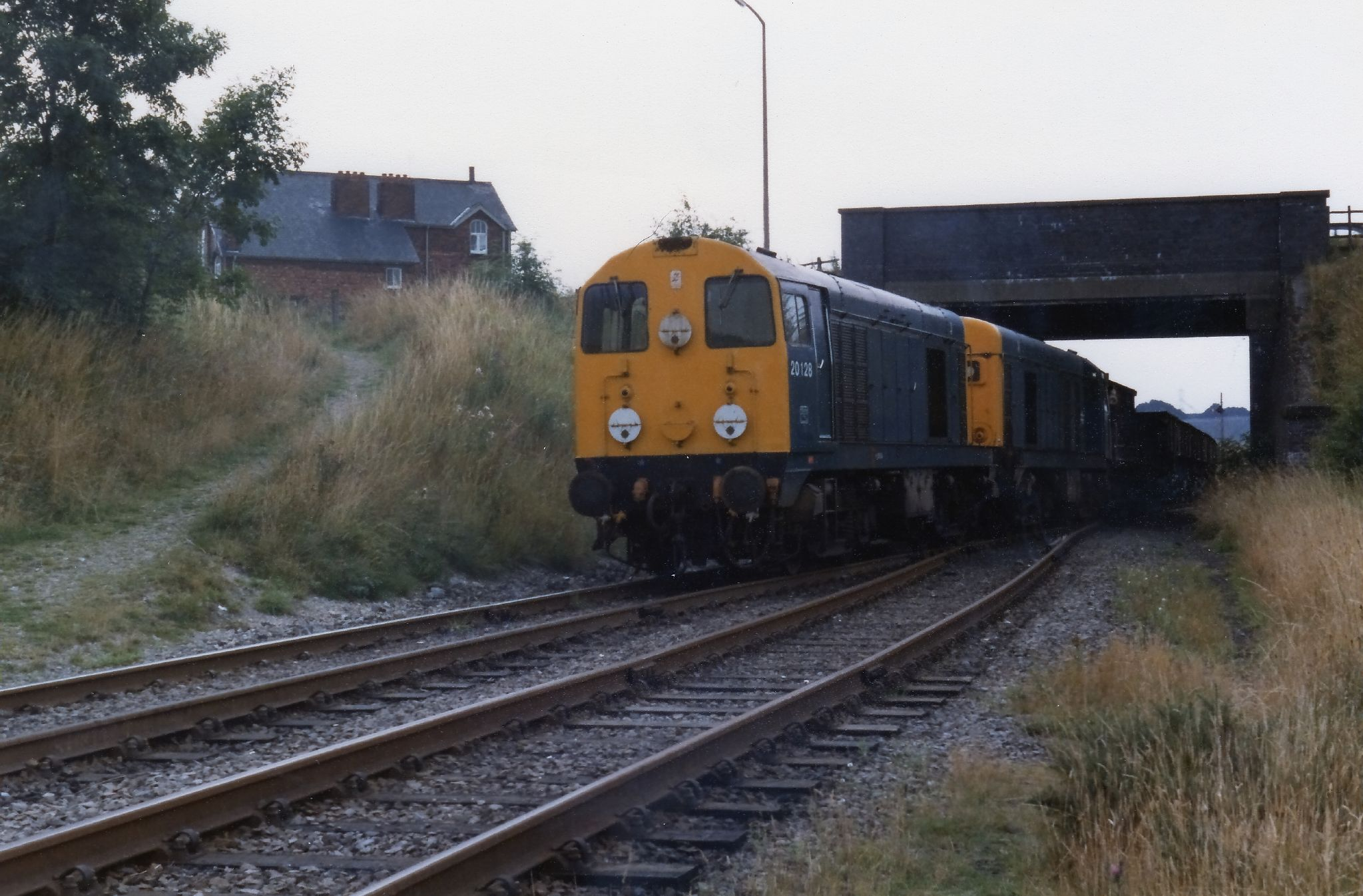
"new Duckmanton South Junction" 1980s-style

Arkwright Colliery closed in 1988, after which all tracks from Arkwright Colliery to the 1981 junction at Staveley were lifted.

== Postscript ==
After the colliery closed methane gas was found to be unstoppably seeping into buildings in the village of Arkwright Town. A new village was built on the north side of the A632 and the old village was demolished. The colliery site was opencasted then landscaped. Coal from the opencasting was hauled by road trucks along the trackbed of the GCR Main Line and put onto trains at Oxcroft Disposal Point. This traffic ended c. 2005 when the coal was worked out.

The landscaping has revealed views never available in the 20th Century, notably with the demolition of the substantial LD&ECR embankment East of Arkwright Town Junction.
