= Henry Savile (politician) =

English courtier, diplomat and Member of Parliament

Henry Savile (1642 – 6 October 1687) was an English courtier, diplomat and Member of Parliament.

Savile was born at Rufford in Nottinghamshire, the third son of Sir William Savile, 3rd Baronet and his wife Anne Coventry. His elder brother was George Savile, 1st Marquess of Halifax.

He served as Groom of the Bedchamber to the Duke of York from 1665 to 1672 and to King Charles II from 1673 to 1678. During this time, he was also made envoy-extraordinary to France between 1672 and 1673 and between 1678 and 1682.

In 1673, he was elected Member of Parliament in an irregular election for Newark, which was eventually declared void in 1677. In the subsequent by-election Savile was properly re-elected, sitting until 1679. He was elected again in 1685, sitting until 1687.

In 1680, he was appointed Vice-Chamberlain of the Household. In 1687 he went to Paris for a surgical operation, but died there.

He was a close friend of John Wilmot, 2nd Earl of Rochester.

Savile was part of the Merry Gang (as Andrew Marvell described them). The Merry Gang flourished for about 15 years after 1665 and included John Wilmot, 2nd Earl of Rochester Henry Jermyn; Charles Sackville, Earl of Dorset; John Sheffield, Earl of Mulgrave; Henry Killigrew; Sir Charles Sedley; the playwrights William Wycherley and George Etherege; and George Villiers, 2nd Duke of Buckingham. The Merry Gang were advocates of libertinism. Members of the gang asserted the right to behave as they pleased and their antics were intended to draw the attention and amusement of the king. Rochester claimed his aim was to halt "the strange decay of manly parts since the days of dear Harry the Second (r. 1154–1189)". The gang engaged in acts that were loud, outraged public decency and often included violence against women.

In 1671, a Thomas Muddyman reported to Rochester that Savile had broken into the bedroom of "Lady Northumberland" (presumably Elizabeth Percy, Countess of Northumberland whose husband Josceline Percy, 11th Earl of Northumberland had died in 1670) with the intention of raping her. In 1675, members of the gang, including Buckhurst, Savile, Rochester, and Sheppard, destroyed a valuable pyramidical glass sundial in the Privy Garden of the Palace of Whitehall. Rochester was heard to exclaim "what does thou stand here to fuck time!" before destroying the piece with Sheppard.

== See also ==
- Savile Baronets, of Thornhill (1611)

Parliament of England
New constituency	Member of Parliament for Newark; 1673–1679; With: Sir Paul Neile 1673–1677; Sir Richard Rothwell 1677–1679	Succeeded by Lord Deincourt; Sir Robert Markham, Bt
Preceded by Sir Richard Rothwell; Sir Robert Markham, Bt	Member of Parliament for Newark; 1685–1687 with Philip Darcy	Succeeded by Lord Savile; Nicholas Saunderson
Diplomatic posts
Preceded by The Earl of Sunderland	English Ambassador to France; 1679-1682	Succeeded by The Viscount Preston
Political offices
Preceded by Sir George Carteret, Bt	Vice-Chamberlain of the Household; 1680–1687	Succeeded by James Porter
