= Duckmanton South Junction =

Coordinates: 53°13′50.2″N 1°21′34.2″W

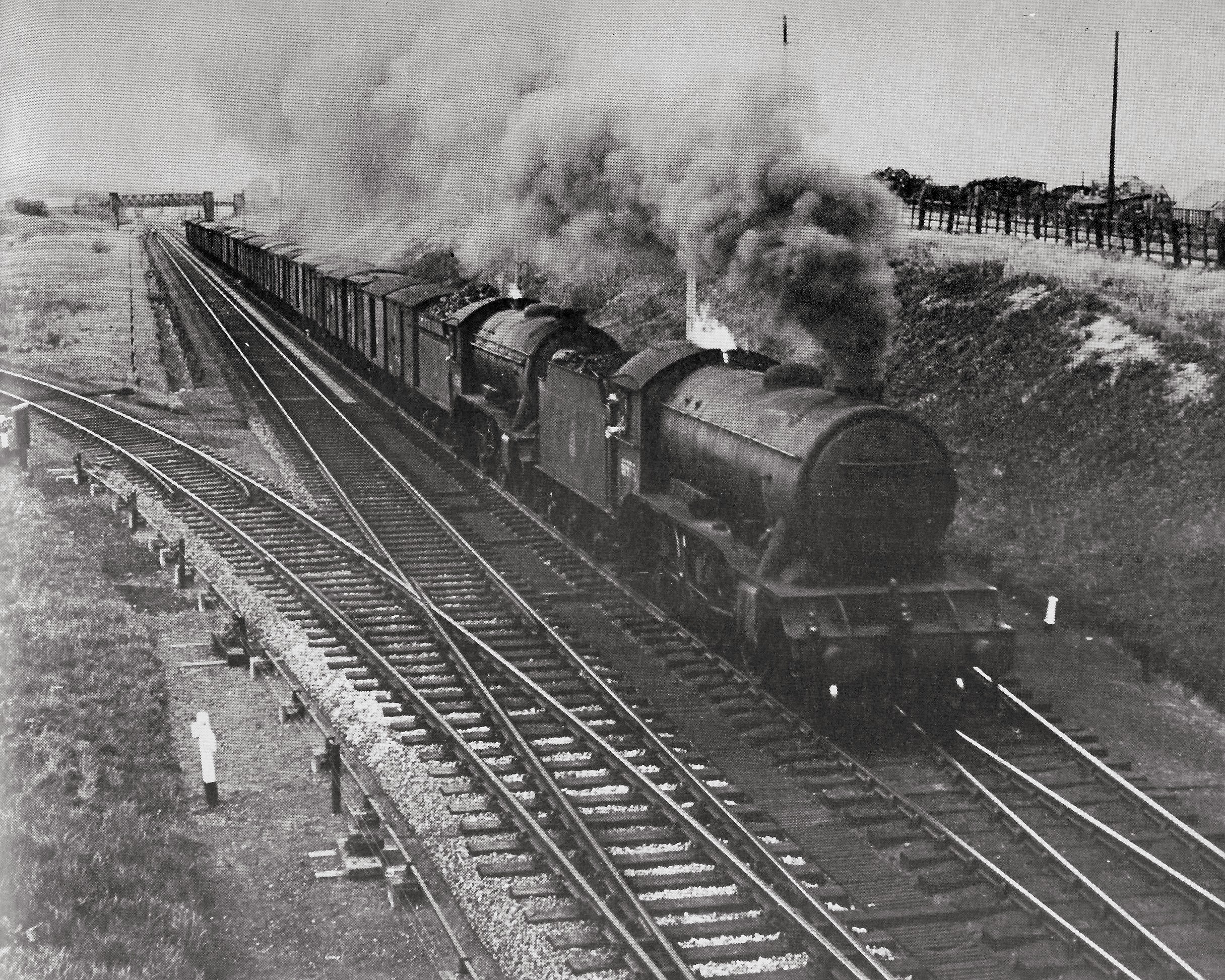
Duckmanton South Junction 1950s

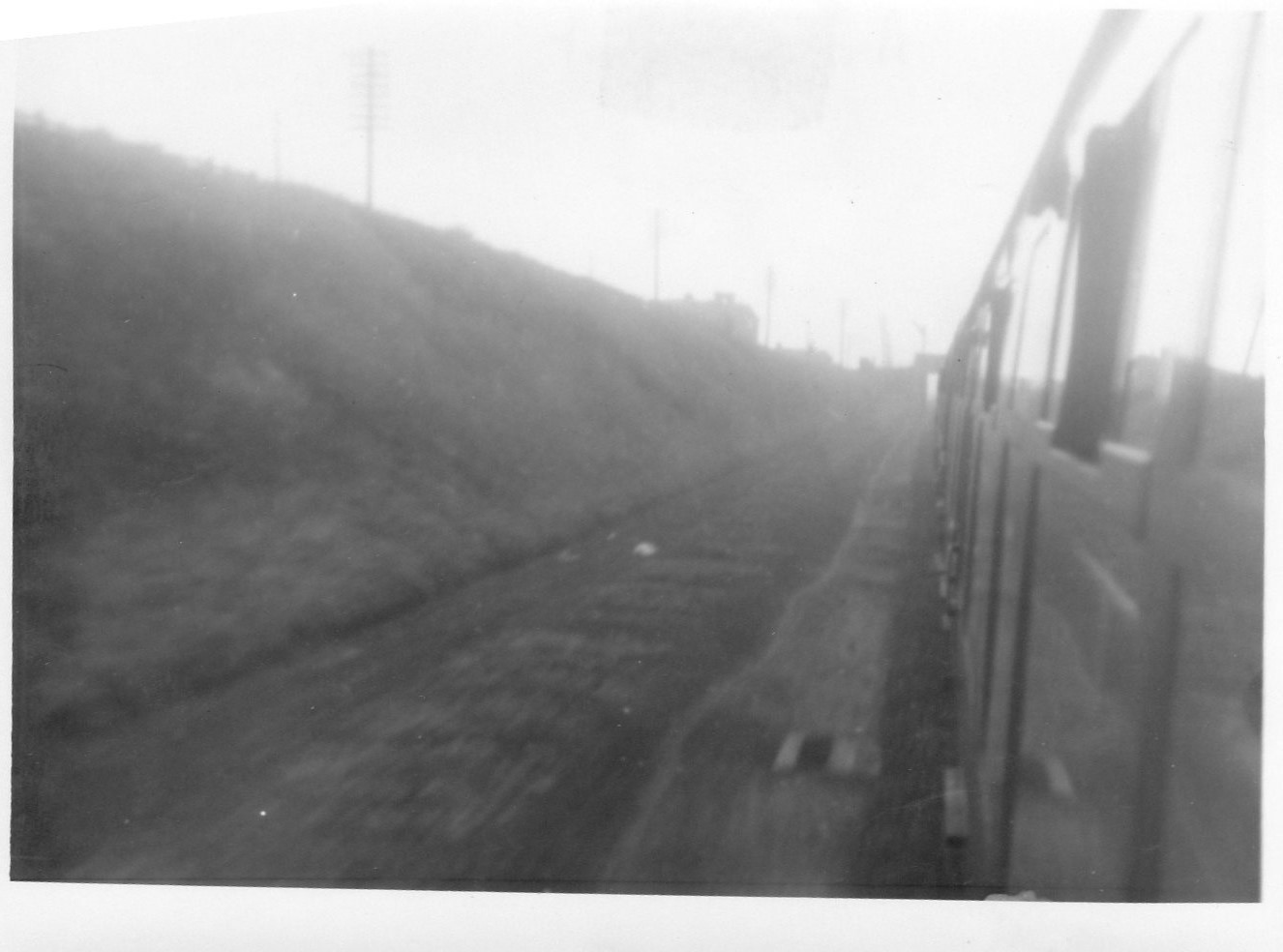
Duckmanton South Junction Feb 1965

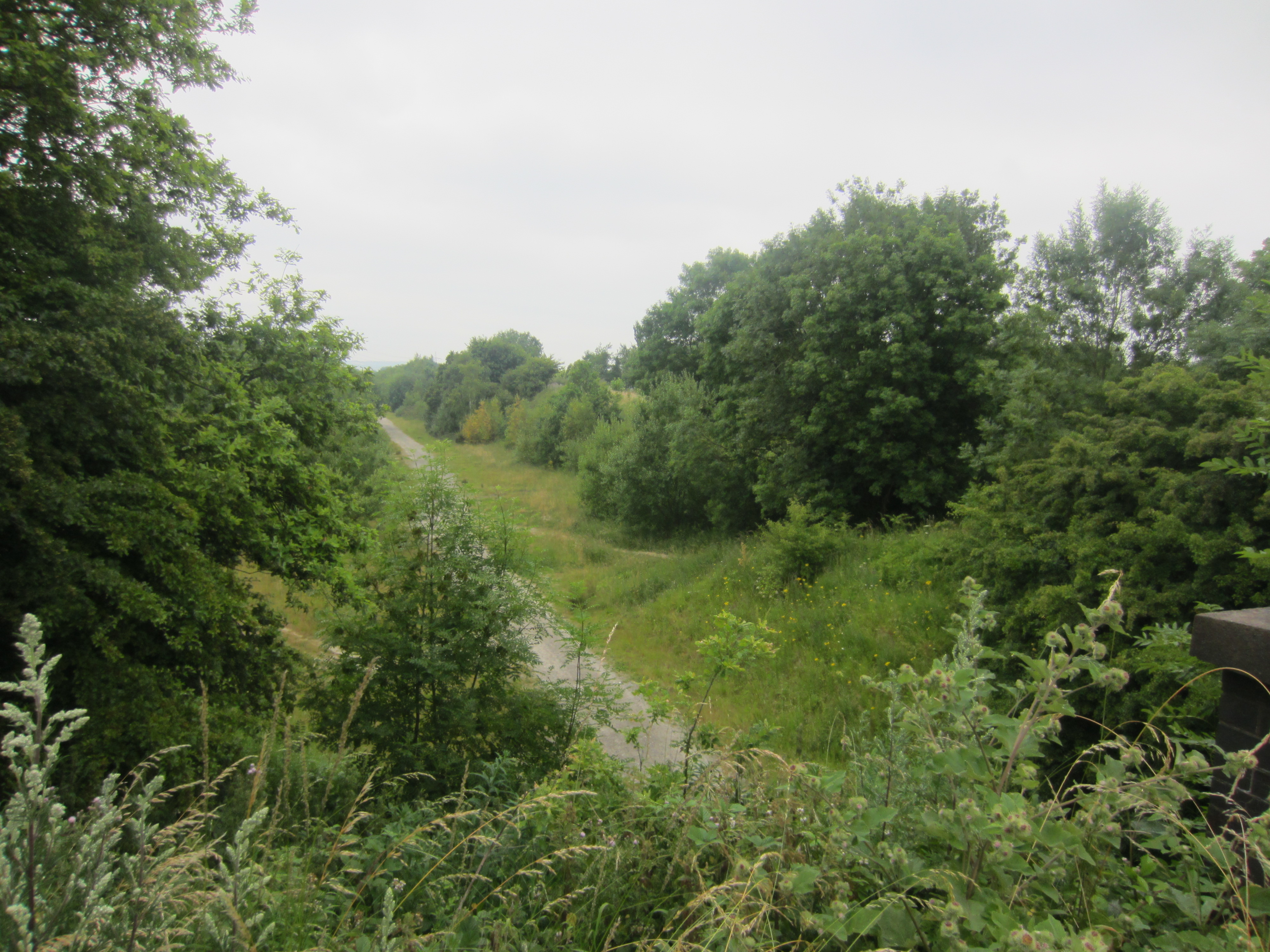
Duckmanton South Junction July 2013

Duckmanton South Junction is a former railway junction near Arkwright Town in Derbyshire, England.

== Context ==
Duckmanton South Junction was one of four interrelated junctions built by the GCR to connect its main line to the LD&ECR's main line when it took the latter company over in 1907. The junctions are usually referred to collectively as "Duckmanton Junction" or occasionally as "Duckmanton Junctions."

== Description ==
The four junctions operated interactively, so they are described together in the article Duckmanton Junction to which the reader is referred.
