= Duckmanton North Junction =

Railway junction in Derbyshire, England

Coordinates: 53°14′21.32″N 1°21′58.2″W

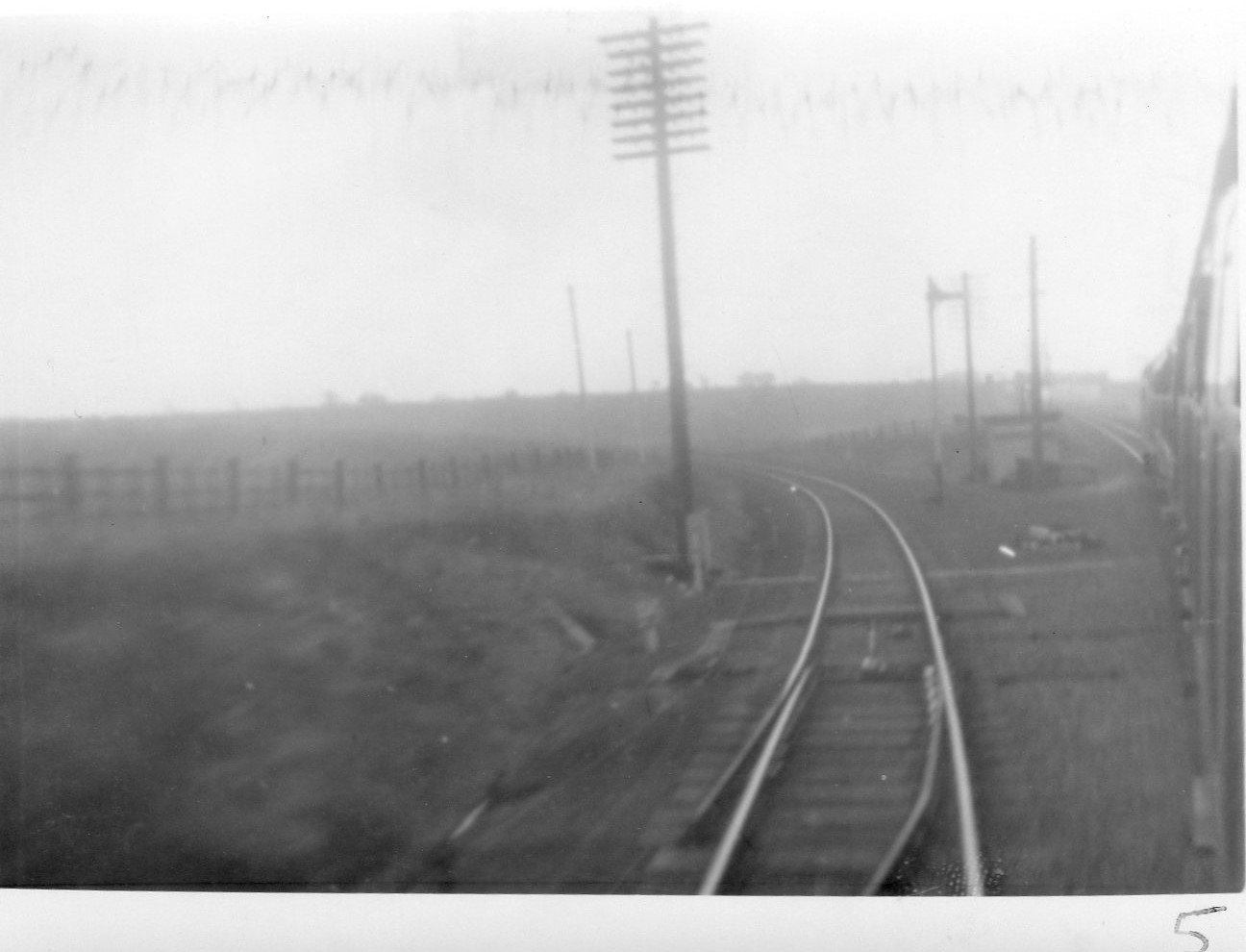
Duckmanton North Junction Feb 1965

Duckmanton North Junction is a former railway junction near Arkwright Town in Derbyshire, England.

== Context ==
Duckmanton North Junction was one of four interrelated junctions built by the GCR to connect its main line to the LD&ECR's main line when it took the latter company over in 1907. The junctions are usually referred to collectively as "Duckmanton Junction" or occasionally as "Duckmanton Junctions."

== Description ==
The four junctions operated interactively, so they are described together in the article Duckmanton Junction to which the reader is referred.
