= Francis Leke, 1st Earl of Scarsdale =

English peer

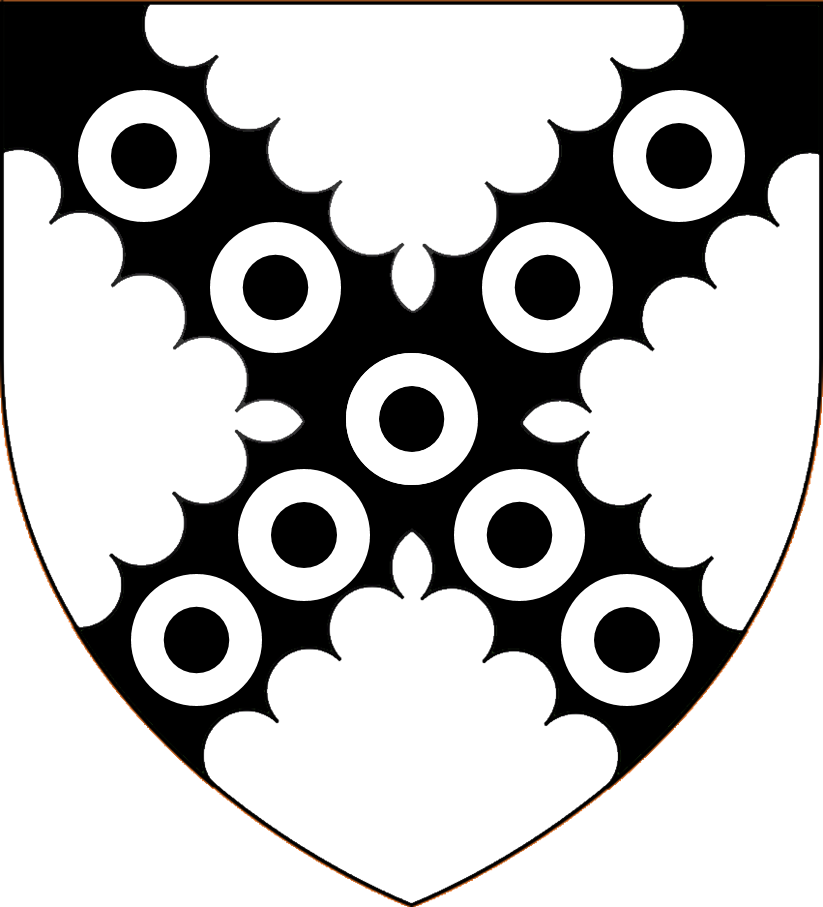
Arms of Leke: Argent, on a saltire engrailed sable nine annulets of the field; crest: A peacock's tail erect proper supported by two eagle's wings expanded argent; supporters: On either side an angel proper upper garments purpure under garment wings and hair or; motto: Gloria Deo in Excelsis ("Glory be to God on high")

Francis Leke, 1st Earl of Scarsdale (1581–1655) of Sutton Scarsdale Hall, was an English peer who fought for the Royalist cause in the Civil War.

== Origins ==
He was the son and heir of Sir Francis Leke (d.1626) by his first wife Frances Swifte, a daughter and co-heiress of Robert Swifte of Bayton, by his wife Ellen Wickersley, daughter and heiress of Nicholas Wickersley of Yorkshire. His half brother William Leke was the father of Sir Francis Leke, 1st Baronet.

== Career ==
Leke was created a baronet in 1611, and in 1624 was raised to the peerage as Baron Deincourt (or d'Eyncourt) of Sutton. Robert Thoroton supposed a d'Eyncourt connection through Morton and Parkhall in Derbyshire, once belonging to the d'Eyncourts, later to the Leke family.(Burke 1852, p. 1381) In 1629, Baron Deincourt was the subject of legal action by his widowed mother over non-payment of monies owed to his dead father.

In the Civil War, st the beginning of April 1643, Deincourt began to fortify his house at Sutton. Sir John Gell, 1st Baronet sent his brother Colonel Thomas Gell, with 500 men and three pieces of ordnance, to besiege it. Deincourt was summoned, but refused to surrender, and for some time obstinately defended himself. The house was taken, and Deincourt and his men were made prisoners; the works were demolished, and Deincourt was set at liberty, on giving his word that he would go to Derby within eight days and submit himself to the Parliament. Sir John Gell observes, that the forfeiture of his word, on this occasion, was revenged by the garrison at Bolsover, who some time afterwards, when that castle was in the hands of the Parliament, plundered Deincourt's house at Sutton. In the same year, fighting under Lord Deincourt's banner, two of his sons were killed fighting for the king at the Battle of Lansdowne, on 5 July 1643.

In 1645 Lord Deincourt was created Earl of Scarsdale. Unpopular with Parliament as a royalist, his estates were sequestered; and as he refused to accept a fine from the Committee for Compounding with Delinquents, they were sold. His son found some friends to be the purchasers, and he paid the sum of £18,000, fixed by the Parliamentary commissioners as the composition.

== Death and burial ==
The Earl of Scarsdale having devoted himself, his family, and fortune, to the cause of King Charles I and monarchy, became so mortified at the execution of King Charles, that he dressed himself in sackcloth, and having his grave dug some years before his death, laid himself down in it every Friday, exercising himself frequently in divine meditations and prayers. He died at his house at Sutton Scarsdale on 9 April 1655, and was buried in the church there.

== Marriage and children ==
He married Anne Cary, a daughter of Sir Edward Cary of Berkhampstead, Hertfordshire, and a sister of Henry Cary, 1st Viscount Falkland, Lord Lieutenant of Ireland, by whom he had the following children:

- Francis Leke, slain in France;
- Nicholas Leke, 2nd Earl of Scarsdale, known during his father's lifetime as Lord Deincourt, eldest son and heir. The titles became extinct on the death of Nicholas Leke, 4th Earl of Scarsdale in 1736, when the family's large estates were sold to meet debts.
- Edward Leke and Charles Leke, who were slain at the Battle of Lansdowne in 1643; Edward also had served as MP for Derbyshire, he spelt his name as Leeke
- Henry Leke, who died unmarried.
- Anne Leke, eldest daughter, who married Henry Hildyard of Winestead, Yorkshire
- Catherine Leke, who married The Hon. Col. Cuthbert/Cutbert Morley (buried in St Mary's Church, Lambeth, 30 June 1669) of Hawnby/Hornby, Yorkshire. The only child and heiress of this marriage was Anne Morley (died 20 September 1701), who married the courtier Bernard Granville (1631-1701) of Birdcage Walk, Westminster, and Apps Court, Walton-on-Thames, Surrey, 4th son of Sir Bevil Grenville (1596–1643) of Stowe, Kilkhampton in Cornwall (a Royalist who died heroically at the Battle of Lansdowne) and younger brother of John Granville, 1st Earl of Bath.
- Frances Leke, married Viscount Gormanston, in Ireland;
- Penelope Leke, married Charles, Lord Lucas of Shenfield;
- Elizabeth Leke and Muriel Leke, died unmarried.

== Ballad ==
A song about his exploits was written by Richard Howitt (one of the "Worthies" of Derbyshire), the first verse of which is:

:O, say not so, Sir Francis,

Breathe not such woe to me :—
Broad and pleasant are your lands,
And your Hall is fair to see.
...

== Notes ==
Peerage of England
New creation	Earl of Scarsdale; 1645–1655	Succeeded by Nicholas Leke
New creation	Baron Deincourt; 1624–1655	Succeeded by Nicholas Leke
Baronetage of England
New creation	Baronet (of Sutton); 1611–1655	Succeeded by Nicholas Leke
