= Listed buildings in Sutton cum Duckmanton =

Sutton cum Duckmanton is a civil parish in the North East Derbyshire district of Derbyshire, England. The parish contains eleven listed buildings that are recorded in the National Heritage List for England. Of these, one is listed at Grade I, the highest of the three grades, one is at Grade II*, the middle grade, and the others are at Grade II, the lowest grade. The parish contains the villages of Sutton Scarsdale and Long Duckmanton and the surrounding countryside. The most important building is Sutton Scarsdale Hall, a ruined country house, which is listed together with associated structures. The other listed buildings consist of a church, houses, farmhouses and farmbuildings, and an ice house.

== Key ==
Grade	Criteria
I	Buildings of exceptional interest, sometimes considered to be internationally important
II*	Particularly important buildings of more than special interest
II	Buildings of national importance and special interest

== Buildings ==
Name and location	Photograph	Date	Notes	Grade
St Mary's Church, Sutton Scarsdale; 53.21515°N 1.33929°W		14th century	The church, which has been altered and extended through the centuries, is in sandstone, and has roofs of slate and lead. It consists of a nave, a north aisle, a south porch, a chancel with a north aisle, and a partly engaged west tower. The tower is in Perpendicular style, with two stages, a string course, diagonal buttresses, and two-light bell openings with hood moulds. Above them is a string course with gargoyles, and an embattled parapet with corner pinnacles.	II*
The Old Priory; 53.21561°N 1.34058°W	—	Early 17th century	A house in sandstone on a chamfered plinth, with a stone slate roof, and coped gables on kneelers. There are two storeys and a west front of seven irregular bays, one bay broad and gabled. On the front is a doorway with a chamfered surround, a blocked doorway with a hood mould, mullioned and single-light windows. The east front has seven bays, and contains four blocked doorways with chamfered surrounds, and mullioned windows.	II
Manor Farmhouse; 53.23685°N 1.33523°W	—	Late 17th century	The farmhouse is in sandstone with quoins, and a slate roof with stone coped gables and moulded kneelers. There are two storeys and attics, and a T-shaped plan, consisting of a front range of three bays, and a rear wing. The central doorway has a moulded surround and a cornice, and the windows on the front are sashes. In the east gable end is a blocked single light and a two-light mullioned window.	II
Sutton Manor; 53.21344°N 1.33513°W		Late 17th century	A house in sandstone with stone slate roofs. There are two storeys and an attic, and a T-shaped plan, consisting of a front range of four bays and a rear wing. The doorway has a moulded surround and a bracketed hood, and most of the windows are sashes. In the west gable end is a mullioned window.	II
Sutton Scarsdale Hall; 53.21543°N 1.33956°W		1724	A country house that was remodelled by Francis Smith of Warwick, and is now a ruin. It is in sandstone and brick with sandstone facing, and the roof is missing. There are two storeys, the east and north fronts have nine bays, the west front has two projecting four-bay wings and a recessed centre, and the south front has eleven bays, the middle seven bays recessed. The east front has banded rustication, an entablature with a modillion cornice and a parapet. Over the middle three bays is a pediment with an armorial achievement on four Corinthian half-columns. The two flanking bays have Corinthian pilasters, and at the ends are pavilions with coupled pilasters, and doorcases with segmental pediments on brackets, and above are windows with moulded surrounds. The north front has giant Corinthian pilasters, and a central doorway with a Gibbs surround and a pediment.	I
Garden walls and gate piers, Sutton Scarsdale Country Club; 53.21449°N 1.34359°W		1745	The walls enclose the former kitchen garden of Sutton Scarsdale Hall. They are in brick with sandstone dressings, brick buttresses and stone copings. and have an octagonal plan, curving towards the entrance. This is flanked by tall stone gate piers with ball finials, and there are similar piers on the opposite side of the enclosure.	II
Garden wall and ha-ha, Sutton Scarsdale Hall; 53.21625°N 1.33895°W	—	Mid 18th century	The wall enclosing the garden is in brick and sandstone, with sandstone copings. To the northeast of the hall is a ha-ha, and to the south it is a retaining wall with a parapet containing a semicircular cut-out motif.	II
Ice house 53.21595°N 1.34509°W	—	Mid 18th century	The ice house is in brick with sandstone dressings, it is domed, and has a circular plan. There is a short entrance passage on the north with stone jambs and lintel, and an inner doorway. The ice house is covered with earth, and there is a small circular shoot hole.	II
Former stable block, Sutton Scarsdale Hall; 53.21505°N 1.34223°W	—	Late 18th century	The stable block, later converted into six cottages, stables and coach houses, is in sandstone and brick with hipped slate roofs. There are two storeys, and four ranges around a courtyard. The east range has seven bays, the middle bay broader with a pedimented gable. It contains a carriage arch with rusticated jambs and stone voussoirs. The flanking bays contain two-light mullioned windows with projecting voussoirs, and in the upper floor are casement windows. The south range has eight bays and casement windows, the west range contains mullioned windows, and in the north range the windows vary, including some sashes. Inside, the courtyard is cobbled.	II
Cherry Tree House; 53.23729°N 1.34254°W		Early 19th century	The house is in sandstone with a Welsh slate roof, two storeys and three bays. The central doorway has a rectangular fanlight, and the windows are small-frame casements.	II
Barn, Manor Farm; 53.23677°N 1.33477°W	—	Early 19th century	The barn is in sandstone with dressings in sandstone and brick, and a slate roof. There are two storeys, and the barn contains a full height carriage arch, doorways, windows and two tiers of slit vents.	II
