= Long Duckmanton =

Village in Derbyshire, England

Coordinates: 53.233333°N 1.333333°W

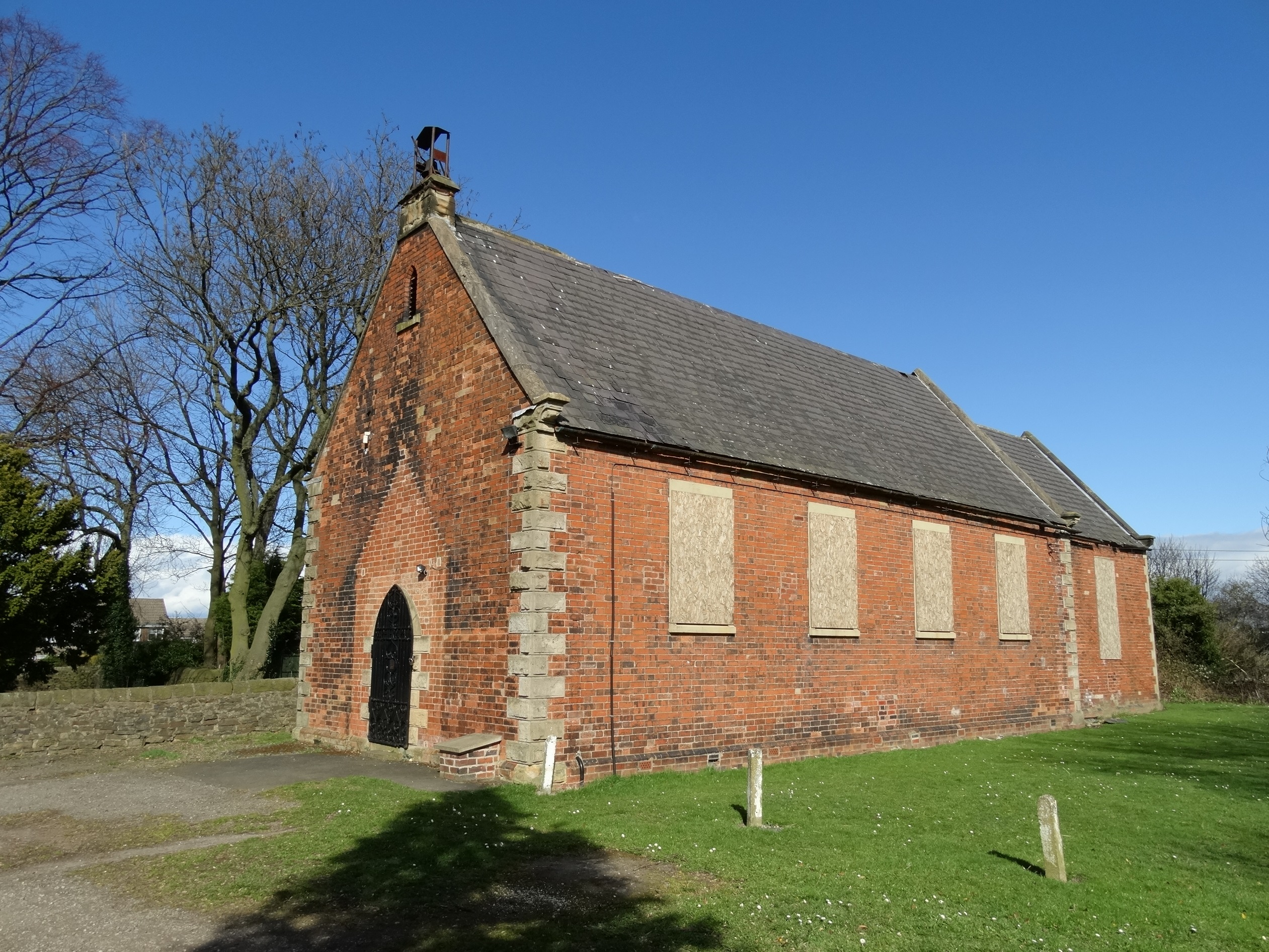
- St Peter and St Paul church

- Location within Derbyshire
- Civil parish: Sutton cum Duckmanton
- District: North East Derbyshire
- Shire county: Derbyshire
- Region: East Midlands
- Country: England
- Sovereign state: United Kingdom
- Post town: CHESTERFIELD
- Postcode district: S44
- Dialling code: 01246
- Police: Derbyshire
- Fire: Derbyshire
- Ambulance: East Midlands
- UK Parliament: Bolsover

Long Duckmanton is a village in the civil parish of Sutton cum Duckmanton between Bolsover and Chesterfield, in North East Derbyshire, England. It is located 3 km west of Bolsover and about 18 km south-east of the city of Sheffield.

== See also ==
- Listed buildings in Sutton cum Duckmanton
