= Lord Lieutenant of Derbyshire =

Civil post in Derbyshire, England

This is a list of people who have served as Lord Lieutenant of Derbyshire. Since 1689, all the Lord Lieutenants have also been Custos Rotulorum of Derbyshire.

- Francis Hastings, 2nd Earl of Huntingdon
- George Talbot, 6th Earl of Shrewsbury 3 July 1585 – 18 November 1590
- Gilbert Talbot, 7th Earl of Shrewsbury 1590/1 – 8 May 1616
- vacant
- William Cavendish, 1st Earl of Devonshire 4 May 1619 – 3 March 1626 jointly with
- William Cavendish, 2nd Earl of Devonshire 4 May 1619 – 20 June 1628
- William Cavendish, 1st Earl of Newcastle 14 July 1628 – 13 November 1638
- William Cavendish, 3rd Earl of Devonshire 13 November 1638 – 1684
- Robert Leke, 3rd Earl of Scarsdale 15 January 1685 – 1687
- Theophilus Hastings, 7th Earl of Huntingdon 23 December 1687 – 1688
- William Cavendish, 1st Duke of Devonshire 17 May 1689 – 18 August 1707
- William Cavendish, 2nd Duke of Devonshire 6 November 1707 – 1710
- Nicholas Leke, 4th Earl of Scarsdale 5 September 1711 – 1714
- William Cavendish, 2nd Duke of Devonshire 15 October 1714 – 4 June 1729
- William Cavendish, 3rd Duke of Devonshire 31 October 1729 – 5 December 1755
- William Cavendish, 4th Duke of Devonshire 21 January 1756 – 1764
- John Manners, Marquess of Granby 23 June 1764 – 1766
- Lord George Cavendish 17 June 1766 – 1782
- William Cavendish, 5th Duke of Devonshire 2 July 1782 – 29 July 1811
- William Cavendish, 6th Duke of Devonshire 27 August 1811 – 18 January 1858
- William Cavendish, 7th Duke of Devonshire 20 February 1858 – 21 December 1891
- Spencer Cavendish, 8th Duke of Devonshire 12 February 1892 – 24 March 1908
- Victor Cavendish, 9th Duke of Devonshire 7 July 1908 – 6 May 1938
- Edward Cavendish, 10th Duke of Devonshire 21 June 1938 – 26 November 1950
- Sir Ian Peter Andrew Munro Walker-Okeover, 3rd Baronet 12 June 1951 – 1977
- Sir Peter Hilton 31 January 1978 – 30 June 1994
- Sir John Knollys Bather 1 July 1994 – 2009
- William Tucker 2009 - 2020
- Elizabeth Fothergill 2020–present

== Deputy lieutenants ==
A deputy lieutenant of Derbyshire is commissioned by the Lord Lieutenant of Derbyshire. Deputy lieutenants support the work of the lord-lieutenant. There can be several deputy lieutenants at any time, depending on the population of the county. Their appointment does not terminate with the changing of the lord-lieutenant, but they usually retire at age 75.

=== 19th Century ===
- John Broadhurst
