= Lêkê =

Sandals popular in Ivory Coast

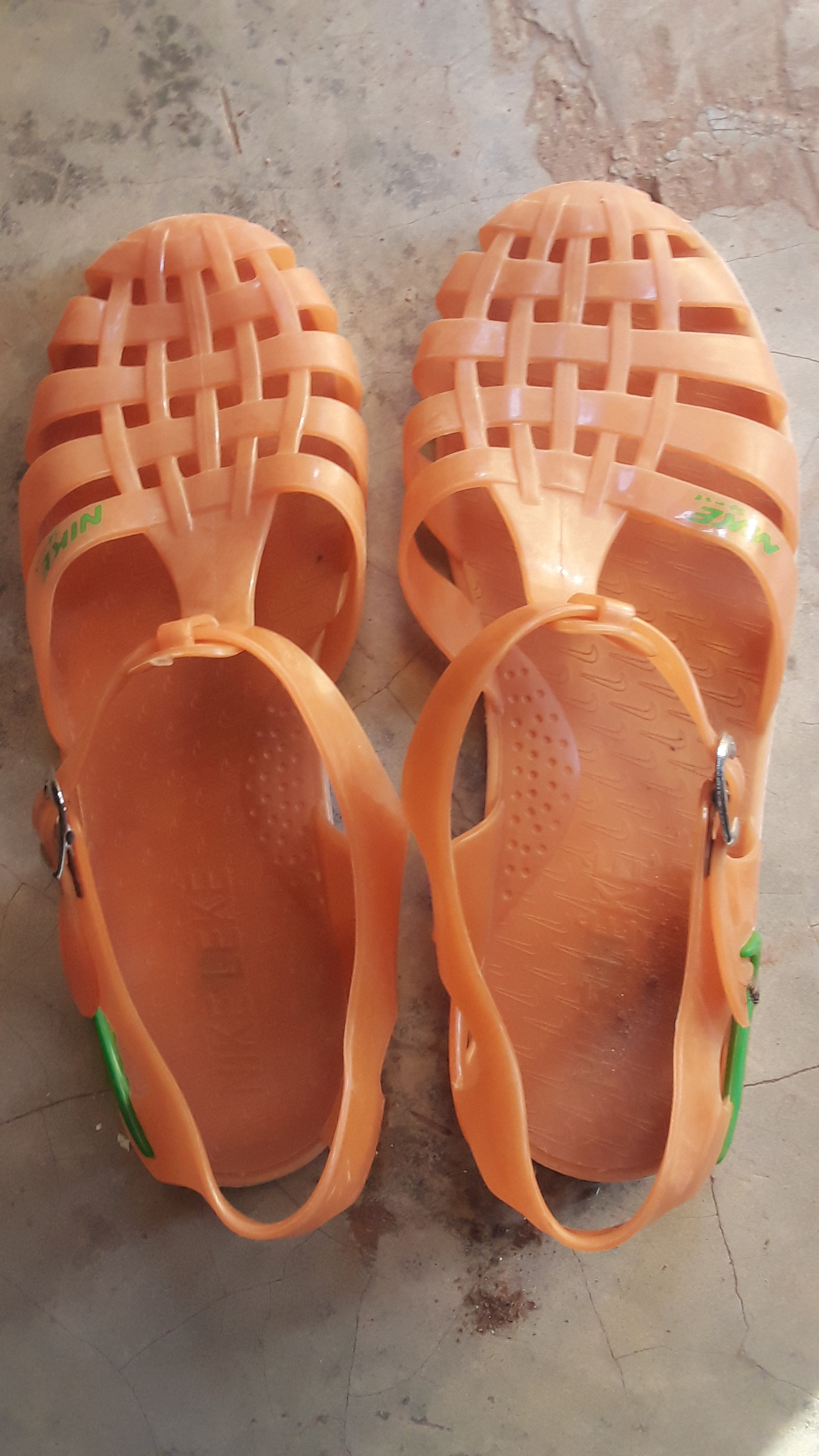
Lêkê

Lêkê are a type of plastic sandals popular in Ivory Coast, including as footwear for amateur soccer games.

Lêkê are considered the national shoes of Ivory Coast, worn by people of all ages, including school children and adults. Amateur soccer players wear lêkê for their practicality on sandy pitches and dusty surfaces, citing their lightness, better fit, and comfort. The popularity of lêkê in Ivory Coast extends beyond sports, being worn at parties and other social events.

== Economics ==
While luxury brands like Gucci and Prada have created their own versions of jelly shoes, lêkê remain popular in Ivory Coast for both stylistic and practical reasons.

Lêkê are affordable, with local manufacturing making them widely available from street vendors for about $1.50. The sandals need frequent replacement due to strap breakage, but their low cost and ready availability ameliorate the process.

== History ==
The origins of the lêkê date back to 1946 when a French knifemaker invented the original model using surplus plastic. In the 1980s, they were worn by those with limited financial means, particularly associated with the zouglou music culture. They have since been sold in Ivorian markets for 30 to 40 years, resisting the global popularity of flip-flops.

== Culture ==
In Ivory Coast, lêkê are not only worn for soccer but also represent a cultural symbol, with specific colors associated with national pride. Sales of Ivorian flag-colored lêkê sandals increased during the Africa Cup of Nations, but they saw a decline after the national team faced losses.
