= Leke baronets =

Extinct baronetcy in the Baronetage of England

There have been two baronetcies created for members of the Leke family, both in the baronetage of England.

The baronetcy of Leke of Sutton was created on 22 May 1611 for Francis Leke, of Sutton, Nottinghamshire who was later advanced as Baron Deincourt in 1628 and Earl of Scarsdale in 1645.

The baronetcy of Leke of Newark-on-Trent was created on 15 December 1663 for Francis Leke, of Newark-on-Trent, Nottinghamshire. He was the Member of Parliament for Nottinghamshire 1666–79; the baronetcy became extinct on the death of his son, Sir Francis, the second Baronet, in 1681.

== Leke of Sutton (1611) ==
- See Earl of Scarsdale for details

== Leke of Newark on Trent (1663) ==
- Sir Francis Leke, 1st Baronet (1627–1679)
- Sir Francis Leke, 2nd Baronet (died 1681)

Baronetage of England
| Preceded by Stradling Baronets | Leke baronets of Sutton; 22 May 1611 | Succeeded by Pelham Baronets |
Baronetage of England
| Preceded by Barnham baronets | Leke baronets of Newark-on-Trent; 15 December 1663 | Succeeded by St Barbe baronets |
