= Sutton Scarsdale Hall =

Country house in Derbyshire, England

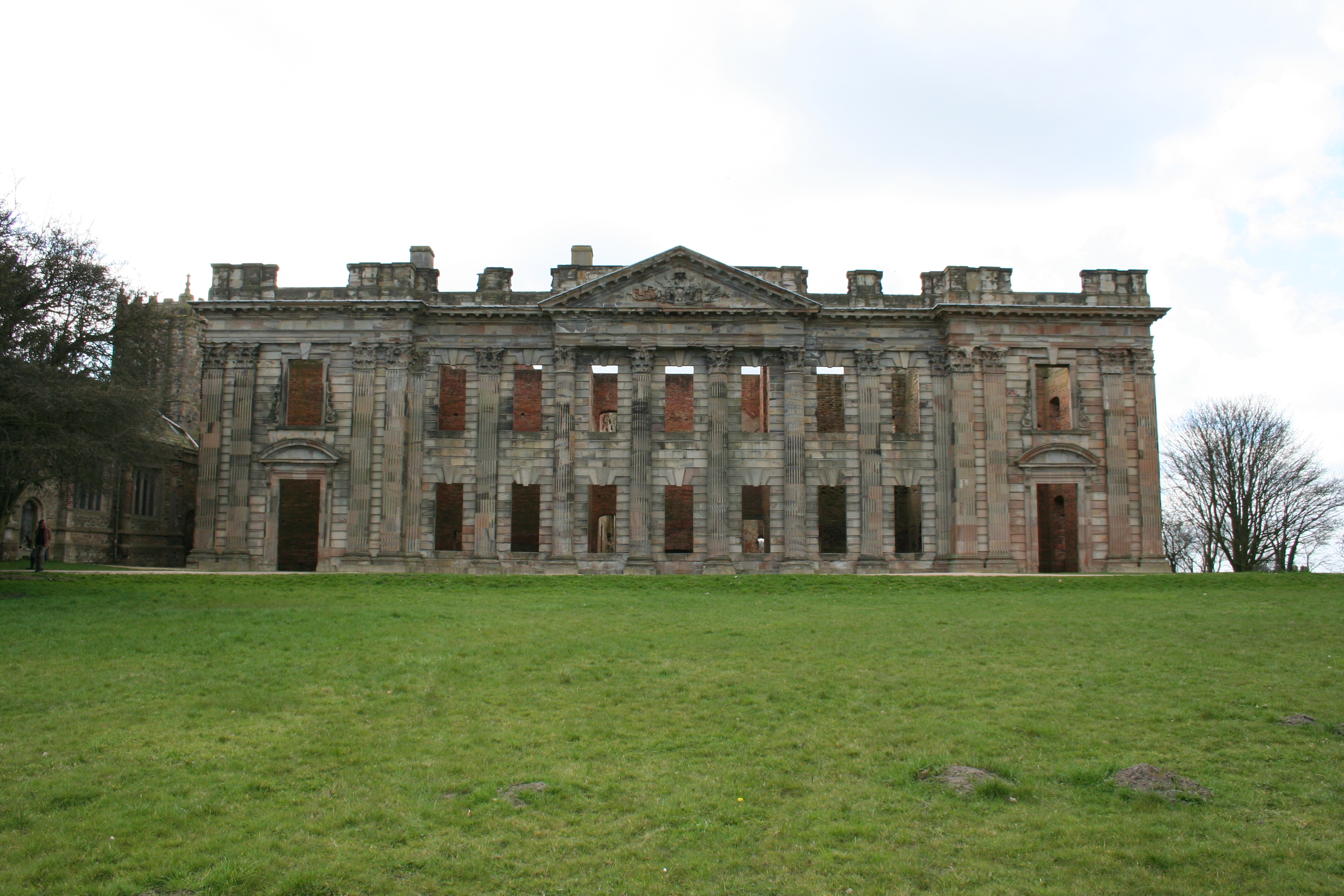
- View of the hall from the eastern lawn

- Location within Derbyshire

General information
- Architectural style: Georgian mansion
- Location: Sutton Scarsdale, Chesterfield, Derbyshire, United Kingdom
- Coordinates: 53.215328°N 1.339663°W
- Construction started: 1724
- Completed: 1729

Listed Building – Grade I
- Official name: Sutton Scarsdale Hall
- Designated: 25 October 1951
- Reference no.: 1108914

Sutton Scarsdale Hall is a Grade I listed Georgian ruined stately home in Sutton Scarsdale, just outside Chesterfield, Derbyshire.

== Estate history ==
The original Hall formed part of a Saxon estate owned by Wulfric Spott, who died in 1002 and left the estate to Burton-on-Trent Abbey. In the Domesday Book the estate was owned by Roger de Poitou. In 1225 the Lordship of Sutton-in-the-Dale had been given by King Henry III to Peter de Hareston, but by 1401 it had been purchased by John Leke of Gotham.

A later John Leke was made a knight by King Henry VIII. His son Francis Leke was created a Baronet by King James I in 1611, and elevated to Earl of Scarsdale by King Charles I in 1640. When the English Civil War broke out, Leke joined the Cavaliers and the Hall's structure was strengthened, particularly so with Bolsover Castle on the opposite hillside swearing loyalty to the Roundheads. When a Parliamentarian force of 500 men led by Sir John Gell surrounded the estate, Leke resisted until the house was stormed and he was taken prisoner. With the estate seized by Oliver Cromwell's forces, after the end of the war a forfeiture fine of £18,000 was levied and paid for Leke's support of the imprisoned King Charles.

== House history ==
The existing structure is believed to be the fourth or fifth built on the site. In 1724, Nicholas Leke, 4th Earl of Scarsdale commissioned the building of a design by architect Francis Smith, to develop a Georgian mansion with gardens, using parts of the existing structure.

On a scale and quality with Chatsworth House, internally it featured both oak ornamental panels and stucco plasterwork by Italian craftsmen Francesco Vassalli, Giovanni Bagutti and the brothers Giuseppe and Adalberto Artari; carved Adamesque fireplaces in both marble and Blue John; and a carved mahogany staircase.

Following the death of the 4th Earl, Member of Parliament Godfrey Clarke purchased the estate in 1740. Some time after his son's death in 1774, Walter Butler, 1st Marquess of Ormonde gained ownership by marriage, and after his death in 1824, Richard Arkwright Junior of Cromford Mill fame, became the owner. William Arkwright of Sutton Scarsdale was High Sheriff of Derbyshire in 1890.

== The Arkwright family ==
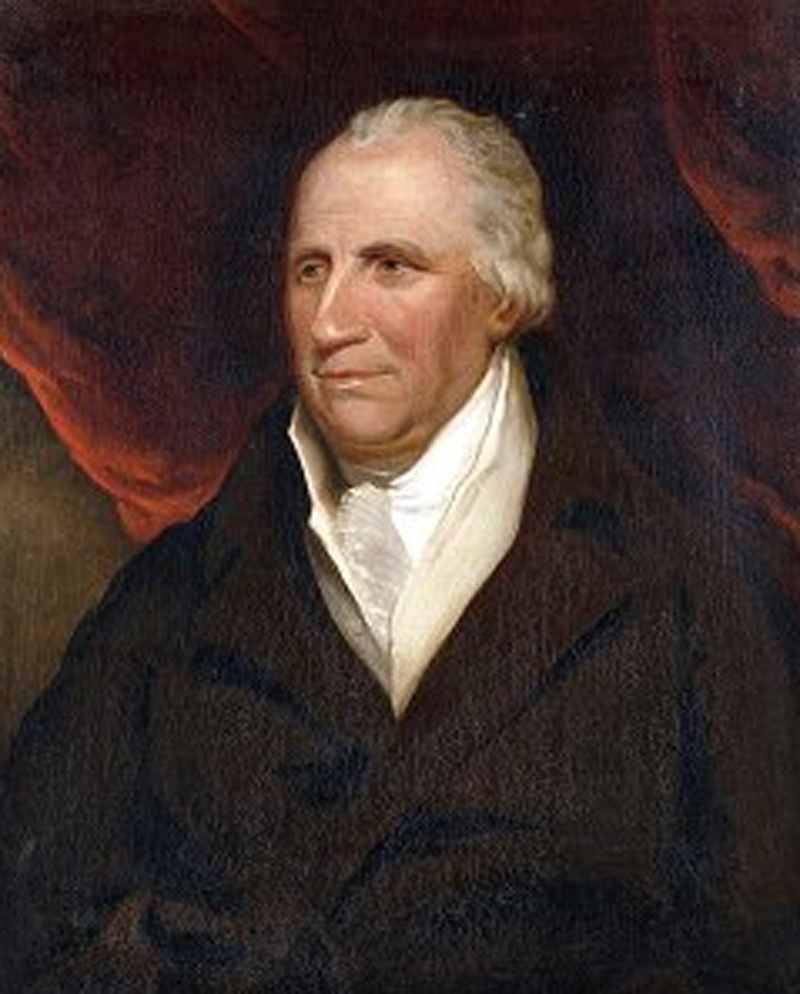
Richard Arkwright Junior circa 1800

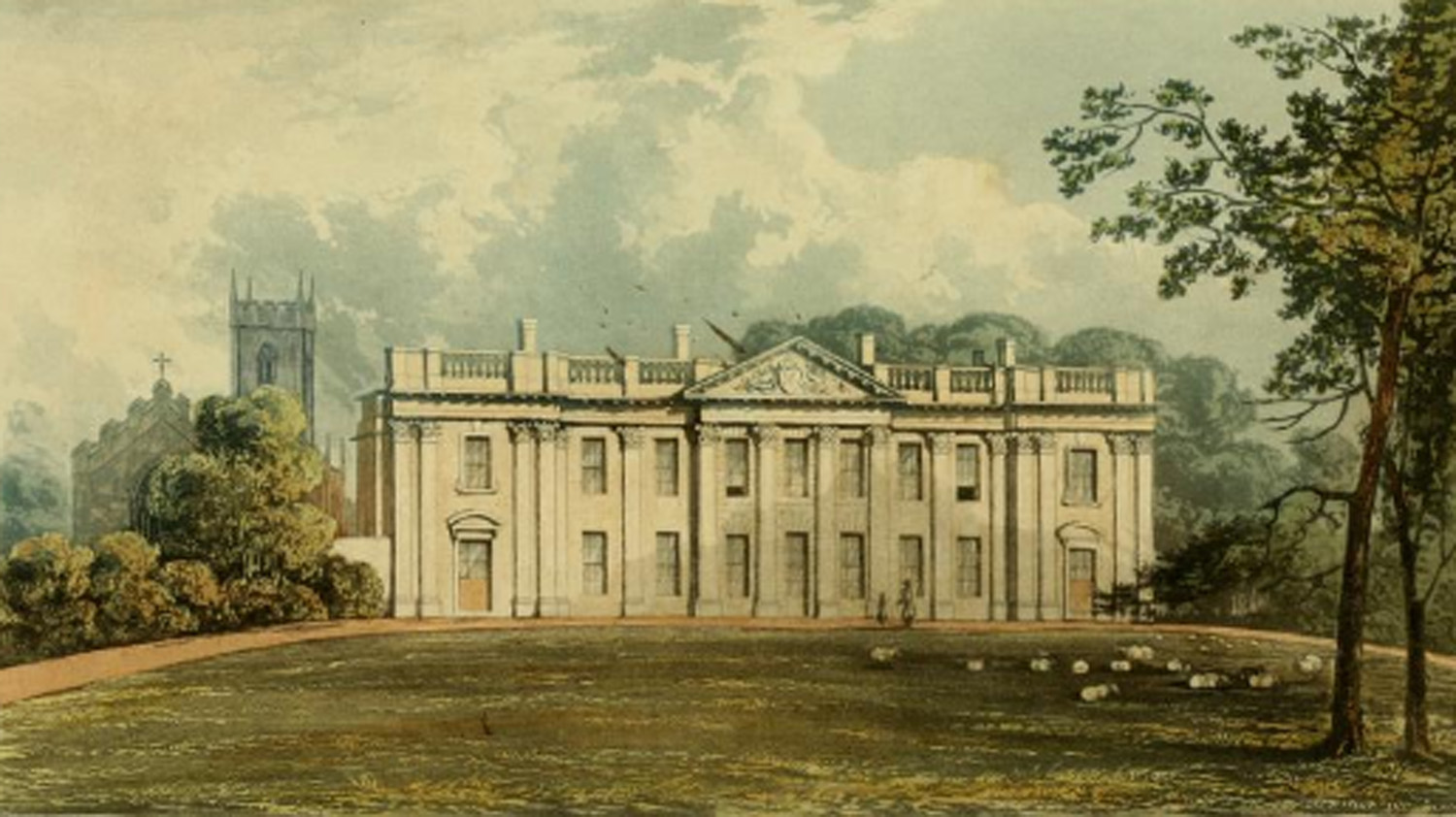
Sutton Scarsdale Hall in 1827, shortly after it had been purchased by Richard Arkwright Junior

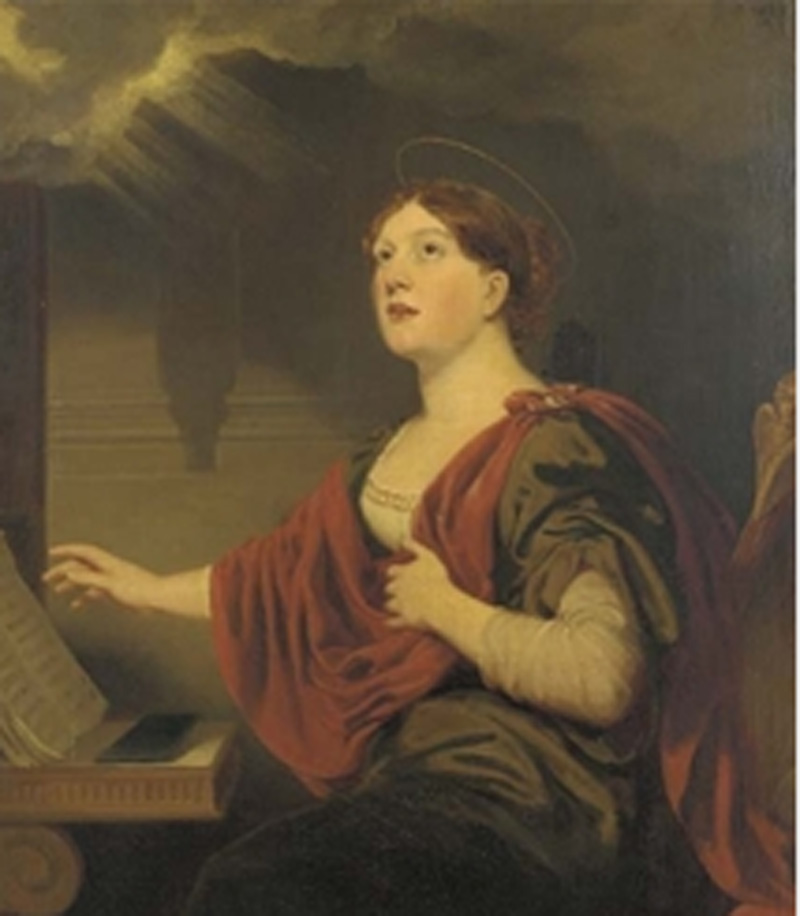
Mrs Robert Arkwright painted as Saint Cecilia by Ramsay Richard Reinagle circa 1810. Before she was married she was Frances Crawford Kemble, an actress. This picture can be seen below in the Oak Room photo below above the fireplace.

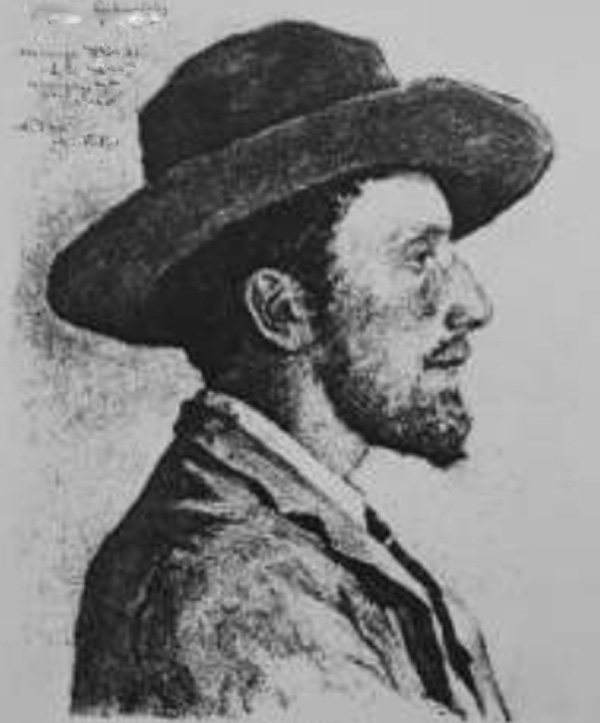
William Arkwright, who sold Sutton Scarsdale Hall in 1919

Richard Arkwright Junior (1755–1843) bought Sutton Scarsdale Hall in 1824. He was the son of Sir Richard Arkwright who invented the water frame and had a major involvement in the cotton industry. Richard had his father's business acumen and prospered in cotton. When he was about 25 he bought the Manchester mill in Millers’ Lane and entered into partnership with the Simpson brothers.

In 1780 he married Mary Simpson and over the next two decades the couple had eleven children, six boys and five girls. When Richard's father died in 1792 he inherited a large part of his estate, and at this point he decided to dispose of most of his cotton mill interests and concentrate on property and banking. In this sphere he amassed a very large fortune and when he died in 1843 he was said to be the richest commoner in England.

After his death his son Robert Arkwright (1783–1859) inherited Sutton Scarsdale Hall. In 1805 much to his family's dismay Robert married the actress Frances Crawford Kemble (daughter of Stephen Kemble), part of the famous theatrical family. His elder brother Richard wrote a letter to their father shortly after the marriage expressing his hope that the marriage was not legal and saying that Robert will “soon repent of not following the advice of you and Mother”. However the family did not need to worry about Robert's choice of wife as Frances became a charming hostess and soon made friends in the aristocracy. She was a gifted writer of music and many of her songs are still available today. Her aunt was the famous actress Sarah Siddons and she often dined with Robert's parents when they were in London.

When Robert died in 1859 Sutton Scarsdale Hall was inherited by his son, the Reverend Godfrey Harry Arkwright. Godfrey was born in 1814 and educated at Eton and Trinity. He was married twice, first to Frances Rafela Fitzherbert who died in 1856 and then to Marian Hilary Adelaide Pellew. He had three children to each wife, four boys and two girls. His eldest son was Francis Arkwright and it was he who inherited Sutton Scarsdale when his father Godfrey died in 1866.

Francis Arkwright was born in 1846 and was educated at Eton. In 1868 he married Louisa Milbank who was the daughter of Mr Henry Milbank and Lady Margaret Milbank. Unfortunately his wife died in 1873. They had only one daughter. He later married Evelyn who was the daughter of William, 3rd Viscount of Sidmouth but they had no children.

In 1874 Francis became a Member of Parliament, a position he held until 1880. In 1882 he migrated to New Zealand and about this time he left Sutton Scarsdale Hall in the care of his cousin William Arkwright. William inherited the property when Francis died in 1915 as Francis had no male heir.

William Arkwright was born in 1857. His father was Major William Arkwright and his mother was Fanny Susan Thornewill. In 1884 he married Agnes Mary Somers Cocks who was the daughter of the Hon. John James Thomas Somers Cocks. William was interested in breeding dogs and wrote a book titled The Pointer and His Predecessors.

In 1919 William auctioned Sutton Scarsdale Hall with the rest of the estate. A description of the house was contained in the catalogue. It read as follows:

The hall is well situated on high ground with fine views, and is a Handsome Classical Building with fine Elevations, built of Stone with Lead and Slate Roof, and contains:-
On the Ground Floor, Fine Entrance Hall about 40ft. 0in. by 25ft. 10in. and Two Inner Halls; Two Drawing Rooms about 34ft. 10in. by 23ft. 6in. and 21ft. 0in. by 21ft. 0in. respectively; Dining Room about 27ft. 7in. by 24ft. 1in. with Strong Room; Morning Room about 22ft.5in. by 20ft. 7in.; Smoking Room about 23ft.2in.by 22ft.10in.; Library about 23ft. 0in. by 14ft. 10in.; Lavatory and W.C's.; Billiard Room about 23ft. 0in. by 22ft. 4in. with Lavatory adjoining; also Servants' Hall about 27ft. 7in. by 22ft. 10in.; Housekeeper's Room, Servants' Sitting Room, Butler's Pantry with Bedroom and Silver Closet, Kitchen, Scullery, Three Larders, Laundry, Four Store Rooms, Drying Room, Boot Room, Gun Room, Lamp Room.
On the First Floor (approached by a Wide Oak Main Staircase and a Secondary Staircase from Centre and Inner Halls) Landing about 23ft. 6in. by 24ft. 0in; Beautiful Ball Room with Carved Oak Ornamentation, and Gold and White Decoration, about 25ft. 8in. by 39ft. 8in. with Coved Ceiling and Columns; Six Principal Bedrooms about 22ft. 10in. by 23ft. 2in., 22ft. 2in. by 20ft. 7in., 18ft. 0in. by 24ft. 2in., 21ft. 2in. by 21ft. 2in., 23ft. 0in. by 22ft. 0in. and 22ft. 10in. by 22ft. 3in. respectively; Three Dressing Rooms, Five Secondary Bedrooms, about 19ft. 2in. by 17ft. 4in., 18ft. 8in. by 16ft. 4in., 19ft. 9in. by 18ft. 7in.; 17ft. 7in. by 18ft. 2in. and 18ft. 11in. by 16ft. 8in. respectively; Eight Smaller Bedrooms, Four Bath Rooms, Housemaid's Cupboard, Four W.C's.; Iron Spiral Emergency Staircase to Ground Floor.
On the Top Floor, Nine Bedrooms; Box Room, Clock Room, and Back Staircase down to the Ground Floor.

— Catalogue for the sale of Sutton Scarsdale Estate. Online reference http://www.richardsbygonetimes.co.uk/sutnscar.pdf

== Derelict shell ==
After many years of neglect, in November 1919 the estate was bought by a group of local businessmen who asset-stripped the house; this went as far as removing the roof in 1920. Some parts of the building were shipped to the United States, where one room's oak panelling was bought by newspaper baron William Randolph Hearst, who planned to use it at Hearst Castle. After many years in storage in New York City, the panelling was bought by Pall Mall films for use as a set in their various 1950s productions. Another set of panels are now resident in the Philadelphia Museum of Art.

In 1946, the estate was bought by Sir Osbert Sitwell of Renishaw Hall, with the intention of preserving the remaining shell as a ruin. The hall was designated as a Grade I listed building in 1951, and is now in the care of English Heritage. The manor was also the inspiration for the derelict Wayne Manor in the movie Batman v Superman.

== Gallery ==
Sutton Scarsdale Hall circa 1900	Sutton Scarsdale hall today	The courtyard of Sutton Scarsdale Hall circa 1900	The courtyard area today

Oak room at Sutton Scarsdale Hall in 1919 showing the portrait of Mrs Robert Arkwright which is shown in colour above.	Staircase and hallway at Sutton Scarsdale hall in 1919	The entrance of Sutton Scarsdale Hall circa 1919	The floorplan of Sutton Scarsdale Hall

== See also ==
- Grade I listed buildings in Derbyshire
- Listed buildings in Sutton cum Duckmanton
