= Nicholas Leke, 4th Earl of Scarsdale =

English politician and courtier

Nicholas Leke
- 4th Earl of Scarsdale

English
- Reign: 1707 – 1736
- Predecessor: Robert Leke, 3rd Earl of Scarsdale
- Successor: None (title extinct)
- Full name: Nicholas Leke
- Born: Nicholas Leke c. 1682
- Died: July 17, 1736 (aged 53–54)
- Noble family: Leke
- Spouse: None
- Illegitimate: Nicholas, Seymour, Margaret (by Margaret Seymour)
- Occupation: Politician, Courtier

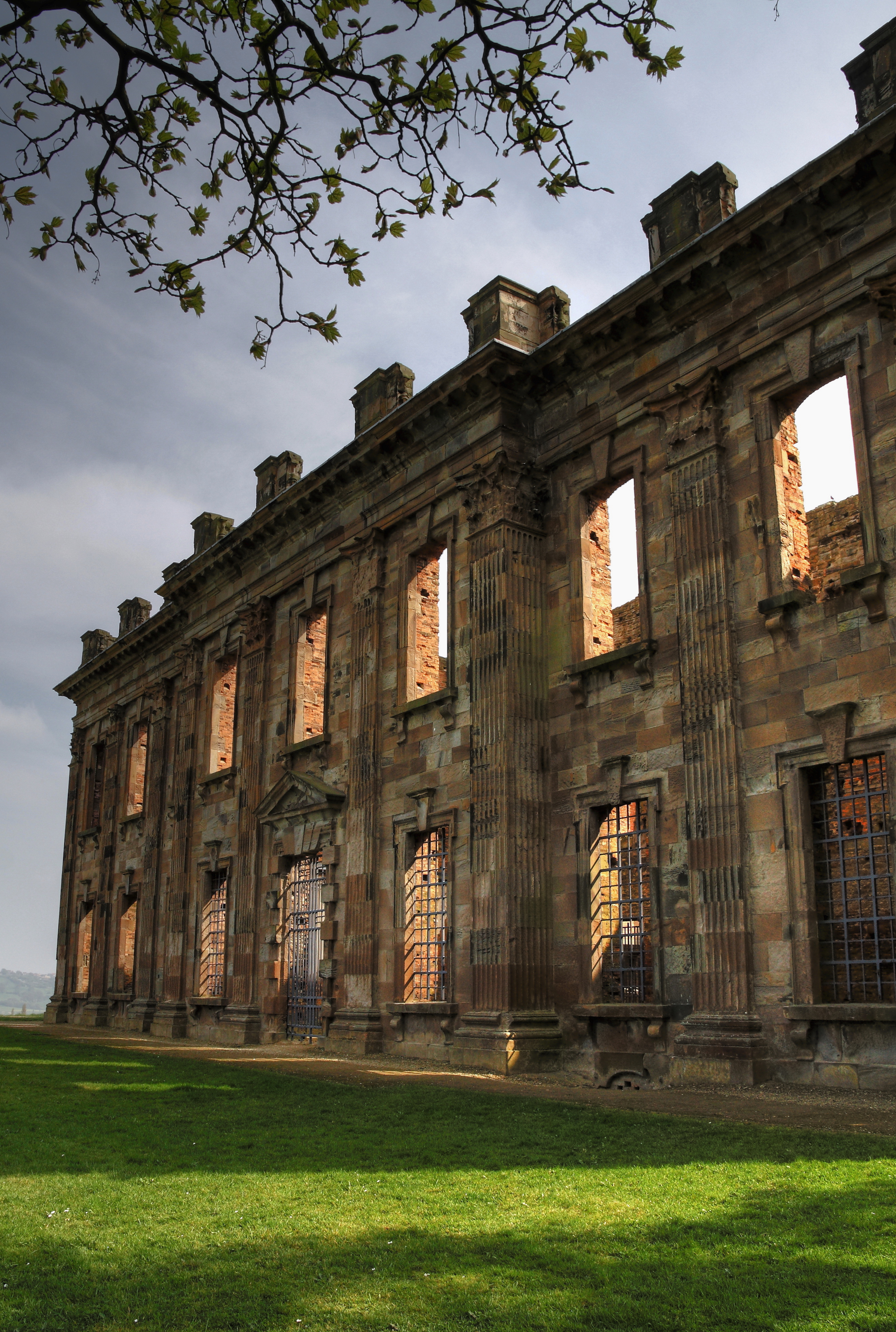
Sutton Scarsdale Hall is Leke' s legacy

Nicholas Leke, 4th Earl of Scarsdale (1682? – 17 July 1736) was an English politician and courtier.

== Biography ==
Leke was the nephew of Robert Leke, 3rd Earl of Scarsdale, succeeding him when Robert died childless in 1707. He was admitted to St John's College, Cambridge in 1699. He sat as a Tory in the House of Lords and was a founding member of the Loyal Brotherhood in 1709.

Scarsdale was Lord Lieutenant of Derbyshire from 1711 to 1714. In 1724 Leke asked the Warwick architect Francis Smith to transform the ancestral home at Sutton Scarsdale to a Georgian style that would rival houses such as Chatsworth House. Smith employed the best craftspeople including Francesco Vassalli, the Atari brothers and Robert Adam.

The building passed through various owners and was stripped in the 20th century. Three of the panelled rooms are now in an American museum whilst the ruins of the building are still there in 2009 as a monument to their ideas. Leke died unmarried and the earldom became extinct. Although unmarried, he fathered three children by Madame Margaret Seymour of Yaxley. Those children were Nicholas, Seymour, and Margaret.

Honorary titles
Preceded by The Duke of Devonshire	Lord Lieutenant of Derbyshire; 1711–1714	Succeeded by The Duke of Devonshire
Peerage of England
Preceded by Robert Leke	Earl of Scarsdale; 1707–1736	Extinct
