= Earl of Scarsdale =

Extinct Peerage of England

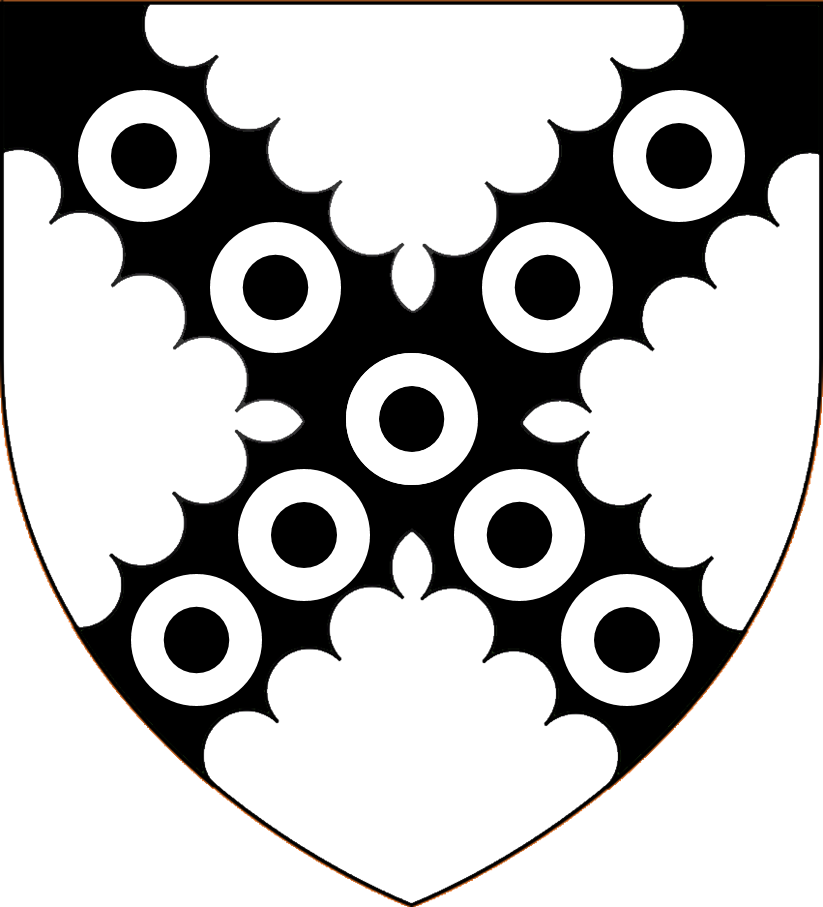
Arms of Leke: Argent, on a saltire engrailed sable nine annulets of the field; crest: A peacock's tail erect proper supported by two eagle's wings expanded argent; supporters: On either side an angel proper upper garments purpure under garment wings and hair or; motto: Gloria Deo in Excelsis ("Glory be to God on high")

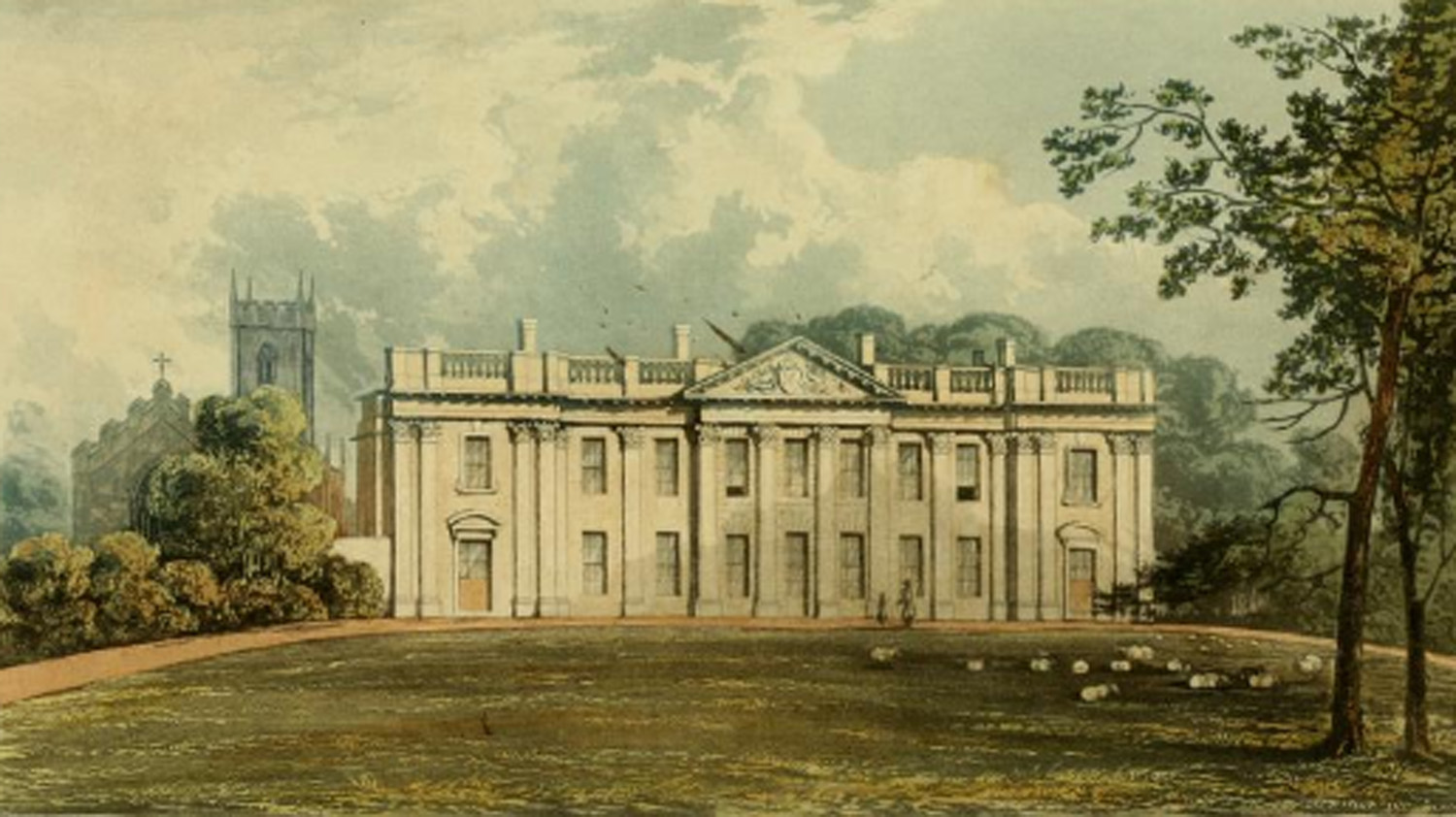
Sutton Scarsdale Hall, circa 1820, seat of the 4th Earl of Scarsdale. Now in ruins

Earl of Scarsdale was a title in the Peerage of England. It was created in 1645 for Francis Leke, 1st Baron Deincourt, an ardent supporter of Charles I during the Civil War. He had already been created a baronet, of Sutton in the County of Derby, in the Baronetage of England on 25 May 1611, and Baron Deincourt, of Sutton in the County of Derby, in the Peerage of England in 1628. His grandson, the third Earl, was a politician and courtier. In 1680, one year before he succeeded his father in the earldom, he was summoned to the House of Lords through a writ of acceleration as Baron Scarsdale. He was childless and was succeeded by his nephew, the fourth Earl. He was the son of the Honourable Richard Leke, younger son of the second Earl. He served as Lord Lieutenant of Derbyshire. He never married, and the titles became extinct on his death in 1736.

One of the family seats was Sutton Scarsdale Hall, Derbyshire, built for the fourth Earl. It is now an elaborate ruin managed by English Heritage. Some of the interior fixtures now reside in the United States, at the Philadelphia Museum. Another family seat was Kirk Hallam Hall, Derbyshire.

== Earls of Scarsdale (1645) ==
- Francis Leke, 1st Earl of Scarsdale (1581–1655)
- Nicholas Leke, 2nd Earl of Scarsdale (1612–1681)
- Robert Leke, 3rd Earl of Scarsdale (1654–1707)
- Nicholas Leke, 4th Earl of Scarsdale (1682–1736)

== See also ==
- Viscount Scarsdale – an unrelated peerage
