= Sir Richard Rothwell, 1st Baronet =

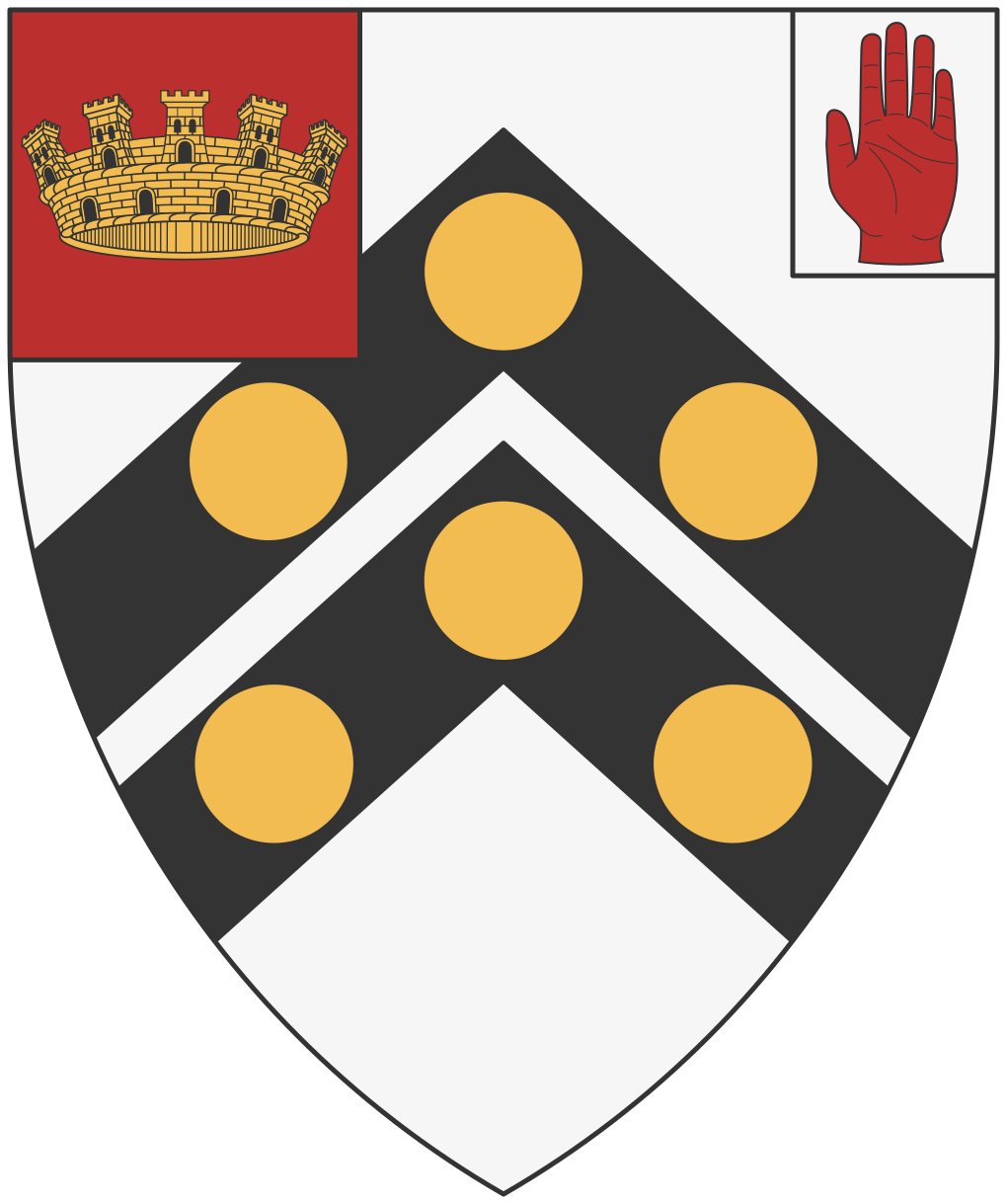
The coat of arms of the Rothwell baronets.

Sir Richard Rothwell, 1st Baronet (c. 1628 – 1694) of Stapleford, Lincolnshire was an English Member of Parliament between 1677 and 1681.

He was the 2nd son of William Rothwell of Ewerby, Lincolnshire. He succeeded his elder brother c. 1655 and was created a baronet (of Ewerby, Lincolnshire) on 16 August 1661.

He served as Member of Parliament for Newark from 1677 to 1681.

He married in 1673, Elizabeth, the daughter of Robert Clifton and widow of Edward Rothwell of Haverholme, Lincolnshire, and with her had 2 daughters. The baronetcy thereby became extinct on his death in 1694.

Baronetage of England
New creation	Baronet (of Ewerby); 1661–1694	Extinct
