= Sir Francis Leke, 1st Baronet =

English soldier, administrator and Member of Parliament

Sir Francis Leke, 1st Baronet (1627 – October 1679) was an English soldier, administrator and member of parliament.

He was born the eldest son of William Leke of Newark-on-Trent, Nottinghamshire and his wife Elizabeth, the daughter of Sir Guy Palmes of Ashwell, Rutland. He succeeded his father in 1651 and was knighted by October 1661. He was appointed a justice of the peace and deputy lieutenant for Nottinghamshire in 1660, holding both positions for life. He was also appointed High Sheriff of Nottinghamshire for 1660–61.

He became an army officer in 1662 whilst still deputy lieutenant in Nottinghamshire. As deputy lieutenant he was ordered to arrest the formidable Colonel John Hutchinson in 1663 for his part in the Yorkshire Plot and was soon afterwards created a baronet. In 1666 he was elected Knight of the Shire (MP) for Nottinghamshire.

He was appointed in 1669 Governor of Gravesend and Tilbury, block-houses on either side of the mouth of the Thames, which was a full-time commitment until his son was old enough to deputise for him.

He died at Gravesend in 1679. He had married Frances, the daughter of Sir William Thorold, 1st Baronet of Marston, Lincolnshire. They had a son Francis and four daughters.

Baronetage of England
New creation	Baronet (of Newark-upon-Trent); 1663–1679	Succeeded by Francis Leke
