= Arkwright Town =

Village in Derbyshire, England

Coordinates: 53.2371°N 1.3594°W

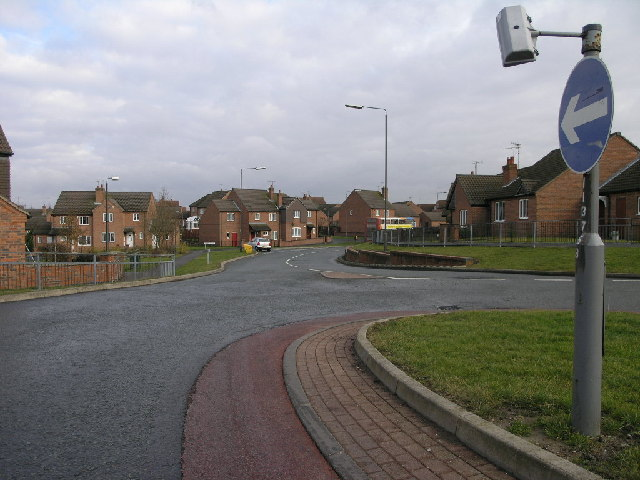
- New Arkwright Town

- Location within Derbyshire
- Population: 1,582 (In Sutton cum Duckmanton, 2011)
- OS grid reference: SK427713
- Civil parish: Sutton cum Duckmanton
- District: North East Derbyshire
- Shire county: Derbyshire
- Region: East Midlands
- Country: England
- Sovereign state: United Kingdom
- Post town: CHESTERFIELD
- Postcode district: S44
- Dialling code: 01246
- Police: Derbyshire
- Fire: Derbyshire
- Ambulance: East Midlands
- UK Parliament: North East Derbyshire

Arkwright Town, usually referred to as Arkwright, is a village in Sutton cum Duckmanton, North East Derbyshire, England that is notable for being moved to a nearby location in the early 1990s. The village is between Chesterfield and Bolsover on the A632 road, and was formerly a coal mining village.

== History ==
Arkwright was founded in 1897 around a coal pit. It consisted of five rows of Victorian terraced houses.

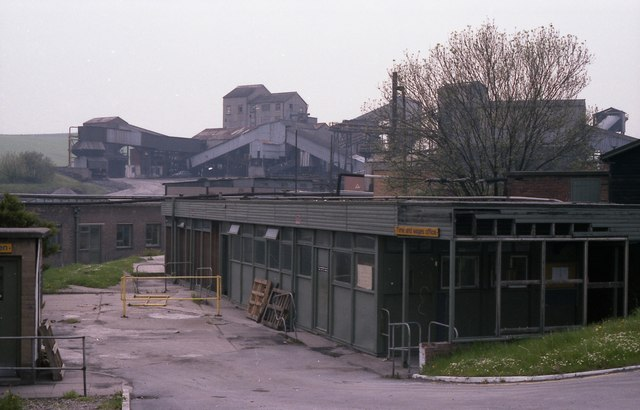
Arkwright Colliery, pictured shortly after the mine's closure in 1988

=== 1984-1985 miners' strike ===
At the beginning of the 1984-1985 miners' strike, miners from Derbyshire voted not to join, but after Yorkshire miners picketed Derbyshire mines including Arkwright, they agreed to strike. The first workers from Arkwright started going back to work in July 1984, with increasing numbers breaking the picket line over the course of the industrial action. By February 1985, only four families in the village remained on strike. Afterwards, many families left, fearing that the mine would soon be closed for good. The Arkwright strike is chronicled in a miner's wife's memoir, Norma Dolby's Diary. The pit was closed in 1988.

=== Evacuation ===
Six months after the colliery closed, the community was affected by emissions of methane gas that caused some of its houses to be evacuated. The village was owned by British Coal and a decision was made in cooperation with Derbyshire County Council to transfer ownership of the 52 properties to a housing trust, construct a new village of 56 properties to the north of the site affected by methane, and move all 400 residents. Construction was completed by 1995 when the old Arkwright Town was demolished. The old village was south of the A632 road, and the new village is north of it. Part of the deal with British Coal included an agreement to open cast a 100-acre site. Work started in November 1993 and continued until about 2005.

A nature walk was established in 2010 following routes once used by railway lines.

== See also ==
- Arkwright Town railway station
- Arkwright Town Junction
- Adelphi Canal
