= Scudamore family =

English noble family

House of Scudamore
- Noble house
- Country: Kingdom of England; Kingdom of Ireland; United Kingdom
- Earlier spellings: de Scudemer, Skydmore, Skidmore, Scidmore
- Founded: c.1042
- Founder: Ralph de Scudemer
- Titles: Viscount Scudamore; Baron Dromore; Baronetcy of Holme Lacy; Baronetcy of Ballingham
- Styles: Viscounts, Barons, Baronets, and Knights
- Motto: Scuto Amoris Divini ('with the shield of Divine love')
- Estates: Kentchurch Court; Holme Lacy

The Scudamore (or de Scudamore) family is an English noble family. The family settled in Herefordshire at two seats, Holme Lacy and Kentchurch Court, before lines moved to Devon, Somerset and Derbyshire. The family first gained prominence in the 15th and 16th centuries, before becoming ennobled as Viscount Scudamore and Baron Dromore in the 17th century, and were granted two baronetcies in 1620 and 1644. The family married into several noble dynasties including the Cecil, Beaufort, and Howard families, and became ancestors to the Earls of Chesterfield.

== Early history ==
A Ralph mentioned in Domesday Book as a tenant under Alfred of Marlborough may have been an ancestor of the family, though the first well-documented bearer of the surname is found in the 12th century. The family subsequently split into two lines, with one holding manors in Upton Scudamore, Wiltshire and in Devon, with several early members who were knighted. This branch then moved firstly to the Mendip Hills in Somerset, and then to Eyam in Derbyshire through the lead mining trade. A cadet branch became entrenched in Herefordshire, with many members serving as deputy lieutenants and High Sheriffs of Herefordshire, eventually becoming ennobled in the 17th century. This branch split into two, with the senior line seated at Kentchurch Court (where they still reside), and the junior at Holme Lacy.

== Prominent family members ==
- John Scudamore (landowner), 15th century landowner, constable and steward of Royal castles in South Wales. Secretly married Alys ferch Owain Glyndŵr one of the daughters of Owain Glyndŵr.
- John Scudamore (courtier) (1542–1623), courtier and Gentleman Usher to Queen Elizabeth.
- Mary Scudamore (1550–1603), courtier to Queen Elizabeth and wife of Sir John Scudamore (1542–1623).
- James Scudamore (courtier) (1568–1619), son of John Scudamore (1542–1623), gentleman usher at the court of Elizabeth 1.
- Sir John Scudamore, 1st Baronet (1600–1649).
- Sir John Scudamore, 2nd Baronet (1630–1684).
- Sir Barnaby Scudamore, 3rd Baronet (C.1720).
- John Scudamore, 1st Viscount Scudamore (1601–1671), English diplomat who served as Ambassador to France from 1635–1639.
- James Scudamore(1624–1668), English politician and son of the 1st Viscount.
- John Scudamore, 2nd Viscount Scudamore (1650–1697), English Landowner and politician.
- Frances Scudamore, Viscountess Scudamore (1652–1694), wife of the 2nd Viscount and the only daughter of John Cecil, 4th Earl of Exeter.
- James Scudamore, 3rd Viscount Scudamore (1684–1716), English landowner and Tory politician.
- Frances Somerset, Duchess of Beaufort (1711–1750), daughter and heiress of the 3rd Viscount. She married Henry Somerset, 3rd Duke of Beaufort, but was divorced by him in 1742 after an affair with William Talbot, 2nd Baron Talbot.
- Charles FitzRoy-Scudamore (1713–1782), English politician and illegitimate son of Charles FitzRoy, 2nd Duke of Grafton. He married Frances Scudamore after her divorce from Henry Somerset, 3rd Duke of Beaufort.
- Frances Scudamore, Duchess of Norfolk (1750–1820), married Charles Howard, 11th Duke of Norfolk but spent most of her married life confined to Holme Lacy in a mentally deranged condition.
- Charles Scudamore (1779–1849), English physician, known for his writings on gout.
- Frank Ives Scudamore (1823–1884), Receiver and accountant general of the British Post Office.
