= Frances Scudamore =

Frances Scudamore may refer to:

- Frances Scudamore, Viscountess Scudamore (1652–1694)
- Frances Somerset, Duchess of Beaufort (1711–1750)
- Frances Scudamore, Duchess of Norfolk (1750–1820)
