= Scudamore baronets =

Extinct baronetcy in the Baronetage of England

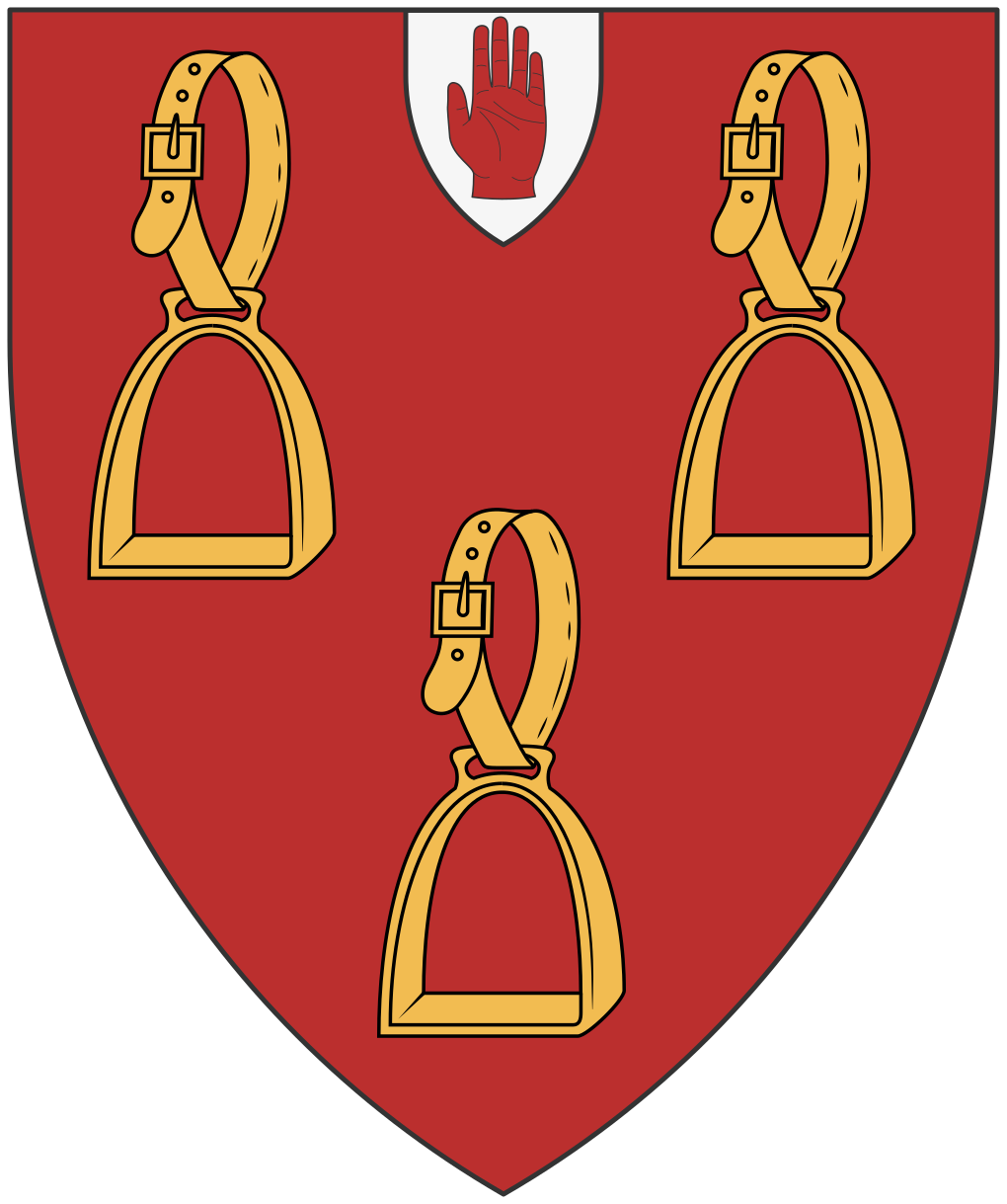
The coat of arms of the Scudamores of Ballingham

There have been two baronetcies created for members of the Scudamore family, both in the Baronetage of England. Both creations are extinct.

The Scudamore Baronetcy, of Holme Lacy in the County of Hereford, was created in the Baronetage of England on 1 June 1620. For more information on this creation, see Viscount Scudamore.

The Scudamore Baronetcy, of Ballingham in the County of Hereford, was created in the Baronetage of England on 23 June 1644 for John Scudamore. The title became extinct on the death of the third Baronet in circa 1720.

== Scudamore baronets, of Holme Lacy (1620) ==
- see Viscount Scudamore

== Scudamore baronets, of Ballingham (1644) ==
- Sir John Scudamore, 1st Baronet (1600–c. 1649)
- Sir John Scudamore, 2nd Baronet (1630–1684)
- Sir Barnaby Scudamore, 3rd Baronet (c. 1720)
