= Holme Lacy Pear =

Pear cultivar

- Genus: Pyrus
- Species: Pyrus communis
- Cultivar: 'Holme Lacy Pear'
- Origin: England, pre 18th century

The Holme Lacy Pear is a cultivar of perry pear. All specimens are clones of the original tree, which was first recorded in the village of Holme Lacy, Herefordshire, in the late 18th century, although it was clearly much older. The tree was noted in many 19th century sources as a botanical curiosity due to its very large size and unusual habit, where layered branches grew along the ground, rooted and threw up subsidiary trunks.

== History ==
The pear tree grew in the glebe and gardens of the rectory at Holme Lacy, adjacent to the church. Late 18th century records claimed that it then covered three quarters of an acre of ground, and produced crops of 5-7 tons of fruit each year. In 1776 the parish register recorded it as producing “fourteen hogsheads of perry, each hogshead containing one hundred gallons"; Charles Martell has suggested that at this point the tree was likely already at least 200 years old. Other than the tree's great size, age, and productiveness, it was noted for its unusual banyan-like habit, where it had “in a strange and abnormal fashion crept along the ground, sometimes quite beneath the surface and sometimes partly above it, for it is not the roots that have thrown up suckers, but the stems [...] these can be plainly traced”.

Sketch by Edwin Lee of now-lost section of Holme Lacy Pear, reproduced in the Gardeners Chronicle, 1878

The tree's creeping habit was supposed to have been partly due to the actions of an earlier parson at Holme Lacy, who noted that a large branch blown onto the ground in a storm had taken root, and asked his gardeners to “layer” other branches of the tree in the same way. In 1858 the tree, despite having some sections removed, was described as then having “eighteen immense branches, proceeding in all directions, as from a common centre", covering an area of about 65 yards in one direction and 103 in another. The gardener of Holme Lacy Court wrote that in 1861 it still produced about seven hogsheads of perry, grew to a height of 50 feet, and that "five of the largest trunks" measured between 8 feet and 8 feet 9 inches in circumference.

By the mid 19th century the tree was said to have been reduced in size from its 18th century extent to about a quarter of an acre, partly to stop it overshadowing the house, although it was still described as very vigorous and productive. A correspondent in the 1860s noted that few years previously the then rector, “wishing to make a substantial fence to his garden”, had “cut and mangled the tree in a sad manner". Hogg's 1876 Herefordshire Pomona described the pear tree as follows:

The tree is very curious and interesting at the present time. In the vicarage garden the group of stems is very picturesque, and several of the trees rise to a height of from thirty to forty feet. There are still nine stems on the lawn, one in the hedge, and seven in the adjoining meadow. Some creeping prostrate stems, and a few upright ones have been removed for lawn improvement. The fruit trees in the garden have a circumference of from 7 ft. to 9 ft. 6 inches in the bole, and added together, the trees give a total circumference of no less than 94 feet.

In another meadow at a little distance, is a complete grove of the same kind of Pear tree. They all seem to have sprung from one original tree creeping along the ground in the same way as those in the garden have done. Its trunk lies prostrate and perishing whenever a new tree is not springing from it. The trees grow closely together and form a cluster nearly forty-four yards in diameter. This group grows upon land which formed part of the glebe, until the year 1875 when it was exchanged for other land belonging to the domain, more convenient for the Vicarage.

By 1912 the remains of the tree were described as “in three parts, of which the principal trunk measures 59ft by 8ft 8 in, and spreads a long way into a shrubbery”; a second in the meadow adjacent to the garden retained several stems; while the third and “most striking” section, probably “separately planted”, lay in a meadow on the River Wye 200 yards away and had eight separate stems measuring “126 paces in circumference”. Since that time the original sections of the tree in the glebe have disappeared, although the section in the meadow adjacent to the Wye remains; material from the latter has been propagated and is now available from several nurseries.

== Characteristics ==
In common with other perry pears, the variety's fruit are small, hard and inedible: they generally measure 32-45mm wide and 30-40mm in length, having pale green skin and slightly astringent flesh. They were described as similar to those of another local perry pear, 'Taynton Squash', and were said to make a "fair" quality perry.
