= Robert Owen Academy =

Coordinates: 52.0599°N 2.7154°W

Location
- Blackfriars Street; Hereford, Herefordshire, HR4 9HS; England

Information
- Type: Free school
- Established: 2013
- Closed: 2018
- Local authority: Herefordshire
- Department for Education URN: 139895 Tables
- Ofsted: Reports
- Gender: Coeducational
- Age: 14 to 19
- Website: http://www.roacademy.org/

Robert Owen Academy was a secondary school in Hereford, Herefordshire, England.

It opened in September 2013. It was formed a specialist school within the Vocational area, the current site of the academy was opened in 2014, previously the group had a site not far away from their current in an area called Holme Lacy but after a £3 million renovation on a £1 million patch of land the academy opened up their new site.

After poor results the school closed in August 2018.
