= Frances Scudamore, Viscountess Scudamore =

Frances Scudamore, Viscountess Scudamore (1652–1694), formerly Lady Frances Cecil, was the first wife of John Scudamore, 2nd Viscount Scudamore.

She was the only daughter of John Cecil, 4th Earl of Exeter, by his wife the former Lady Frances Manners. Her brother, John, became the 5th earl. She married Viscount Scudamore in 1672, the year after he inherited the title.

In August 1681, Frances is reputed to have eloped with Thomas Coningsby, 1st Earl Coningsby, who was also married. It was subsequently claimed that he had fathered her children. They were caught in the act by his wife, and Viscount Scudamore sent a party of men to apprehend the couple, whereupon Frances returned to her husband.

Their children were:

- Cecil Scudamore
- James Scudamore, 3rd Viscount Scudamore
- John Scudamore (c. 1687–1713), who married Elizabeth and had one child, Frances

The countess's portrait was painted by Sir Peter Lely.

She was buried at the family seat of Holme Lacy.
