= Madeline Turner =

American inventor

Madeline M. Turner
- Born: California
- Occupation: Inventor
- Known for: Turner's Fruit-Press

Madeline M. Turner was a Black American Freedman inventor. She invented Turner's Fruit-Press, which paved the way for further development of the fruit press. She was granted U.S. patent 1,180,959 on April 25, 1916 and exhibited her invention at the Panama–California Exposition.

Turner lived in Oakland, California. Her fruit press allowed fruit to be pushed into an opening and cut in half. The fruit would be shifted between different plates until juiced. The press resembled a form of an assembly line. The fruit press was called "ingenious" by a patent review committee member.

== Early life ==
Madeline M. Turner was a trailblazing African American woman born and raised in the vibrant city of Oakland, California. Despite her significant contributions to the world of inventions and fruit juice making, not much is known about her personal life. Madeline M. Turner’s death and birth dates are not known. The inception of Turner's Fruit Press was a moment of practical ingenuity that unfolded in the simple act of squeezing an orange for a morning juice. Faced with the wearisome and time-consuming task, Madeline recognized a universal pain point shared by many—the laborious process of manually extracting juice from fruits. Undeterred by the lack of convenience, she resolved to embark on a journey to create a solution that would simplify this task while maximizing the juice yield from each fruit.

== Inventions ==
Driven by a keen sense of innovation and a keen understanding of the challenges faced by individuals grappling with the laborious task of manually extracting juice from fruits, Madeline M. Turner embarked on a journey. Recognizing the prevalent pain point of inefficiency in the fruit pressing process, she dedicated herself to the development of a groundbreaking product poised to alleviate this struggle and enhance accessibility. Her invention worked by pressing fruit into an opening and being cut in half via a cog. The fruit was then pushed between different plates until it was juiced accordingly. The fruit press machine was granted U.S. patent 1,180,959 on April 25, 1916. Because of its simple, easy to clean, and efficient design, the invention, which was dubbed “ingenious” by the patent committee, revolutionized the fruit juice process. The invention was then displayed at the Panama-California Exhibition in San Diego.

Madeline Turner's invention had a profound impact, revolutionizing the juice industry. Her innovative contribution transformed the way people approached and conducted fruit juice extraction, significantly growing the sector. As a result of her gumption, in 2020 the juice and smoothie industry received a sizable revenue of $2.6 billion. It is incredibly evident that Madeline Turner contributed to the incredible size of this market, as between 1948 and 2014 seven other patents referenced her invention. Due to Madeline Turner’s invention, juicing became a much more efficient process, which allowed businesses to expand their juice selling capabilities. Because of this, 4,170 juice and smoothie businesses exist in the United States of America as of 2022. Additionally, the industry has steadily grown every year. Ultimately, Madeline Turner’s innovative thinking paved the way for an insurmountable amount of business growth and efficiency for herself and for businesses and individuals that followed her. - 2014 have cited her patent.
