= Fruit press =

Machine or tool for separating fruits' juices from the rest of their parts

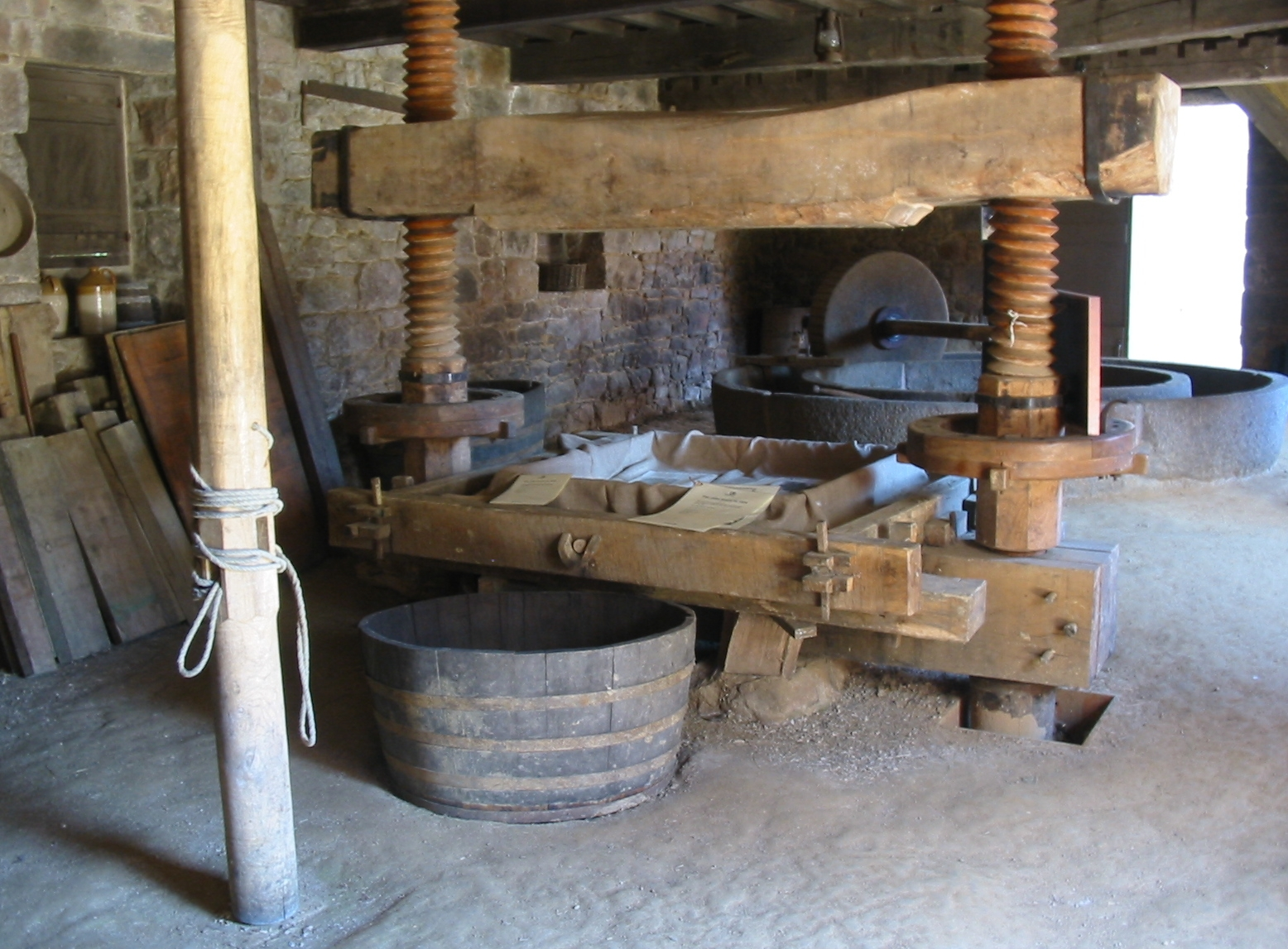
A traditional cider press

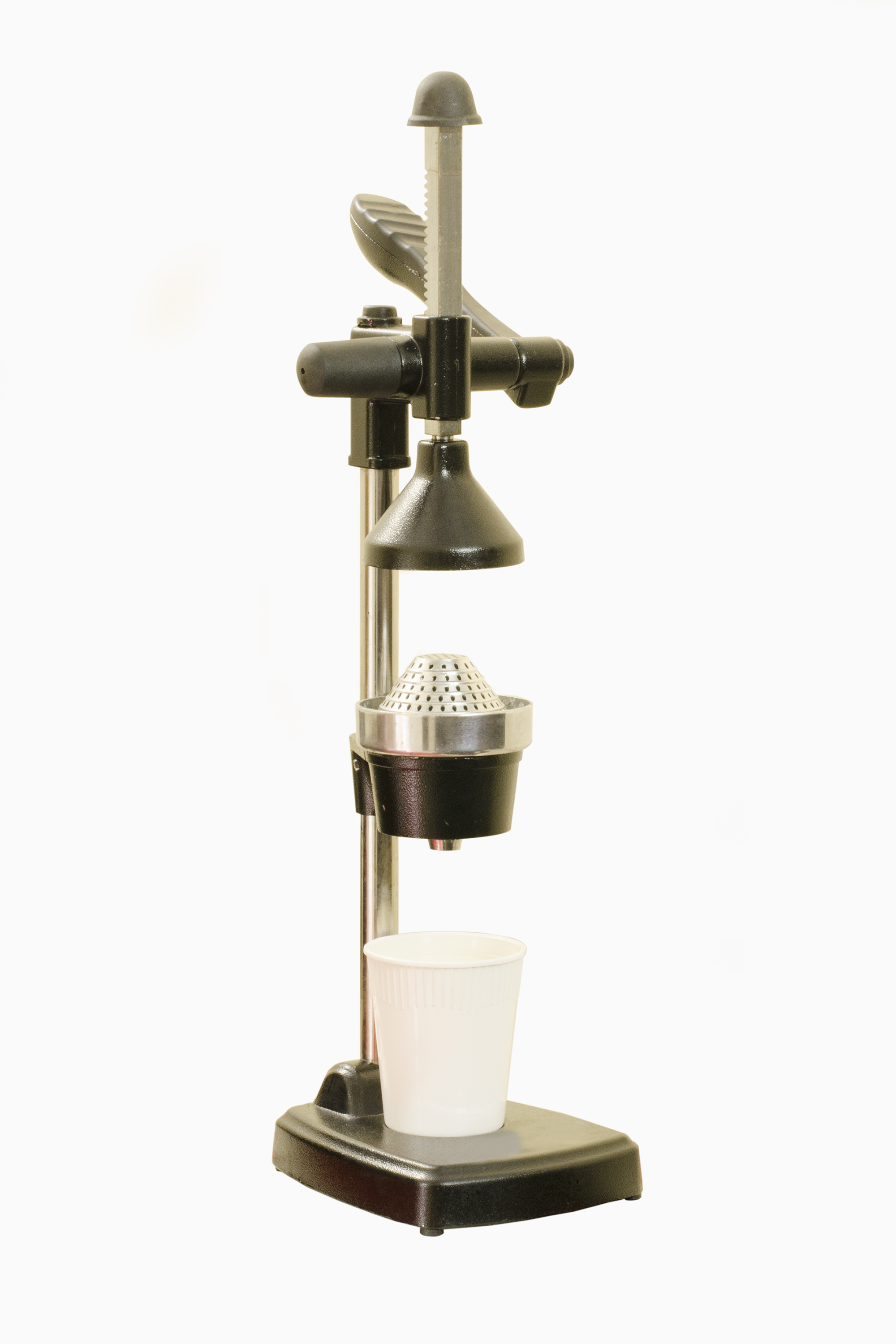
A hand press juicer

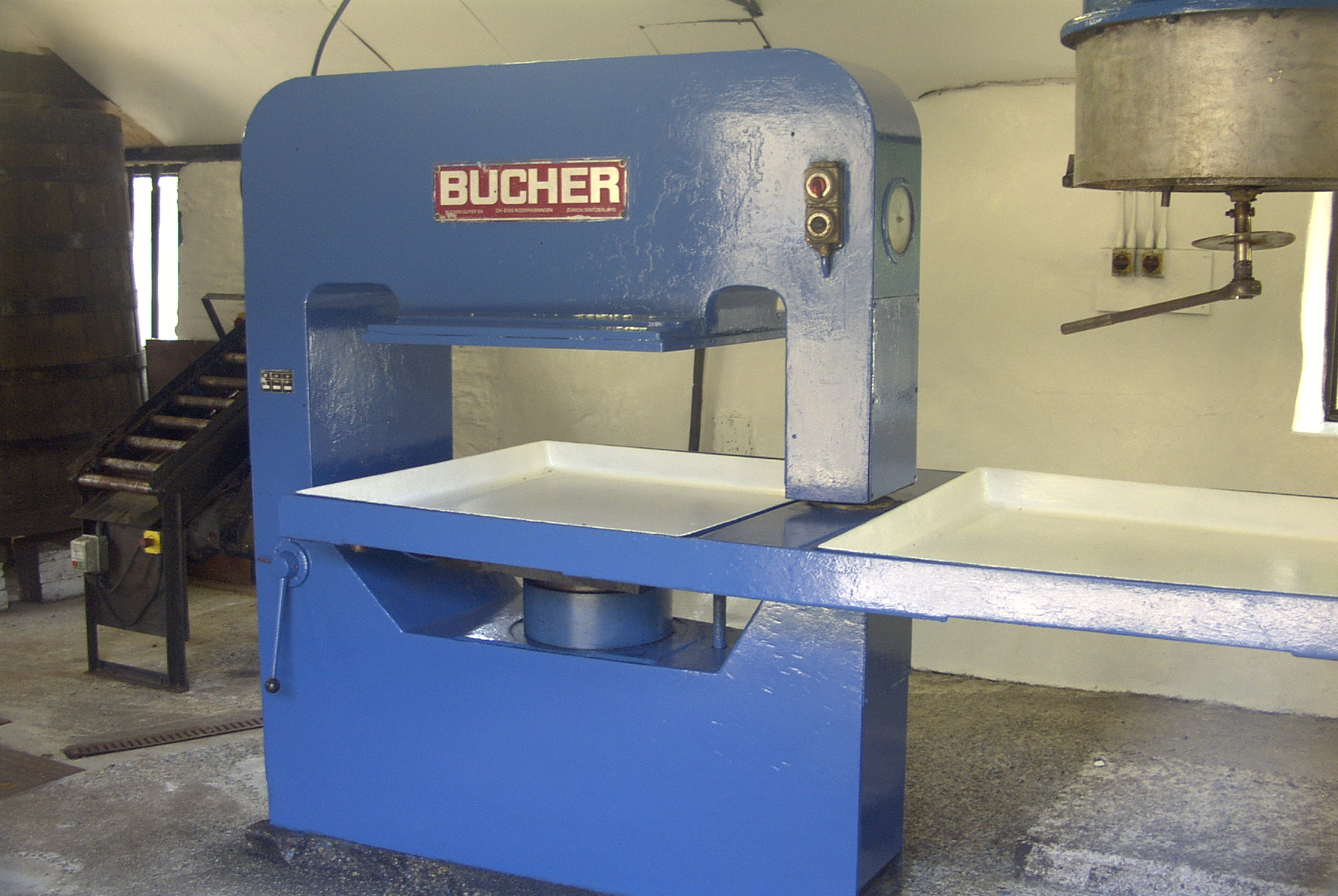
A modern cider press

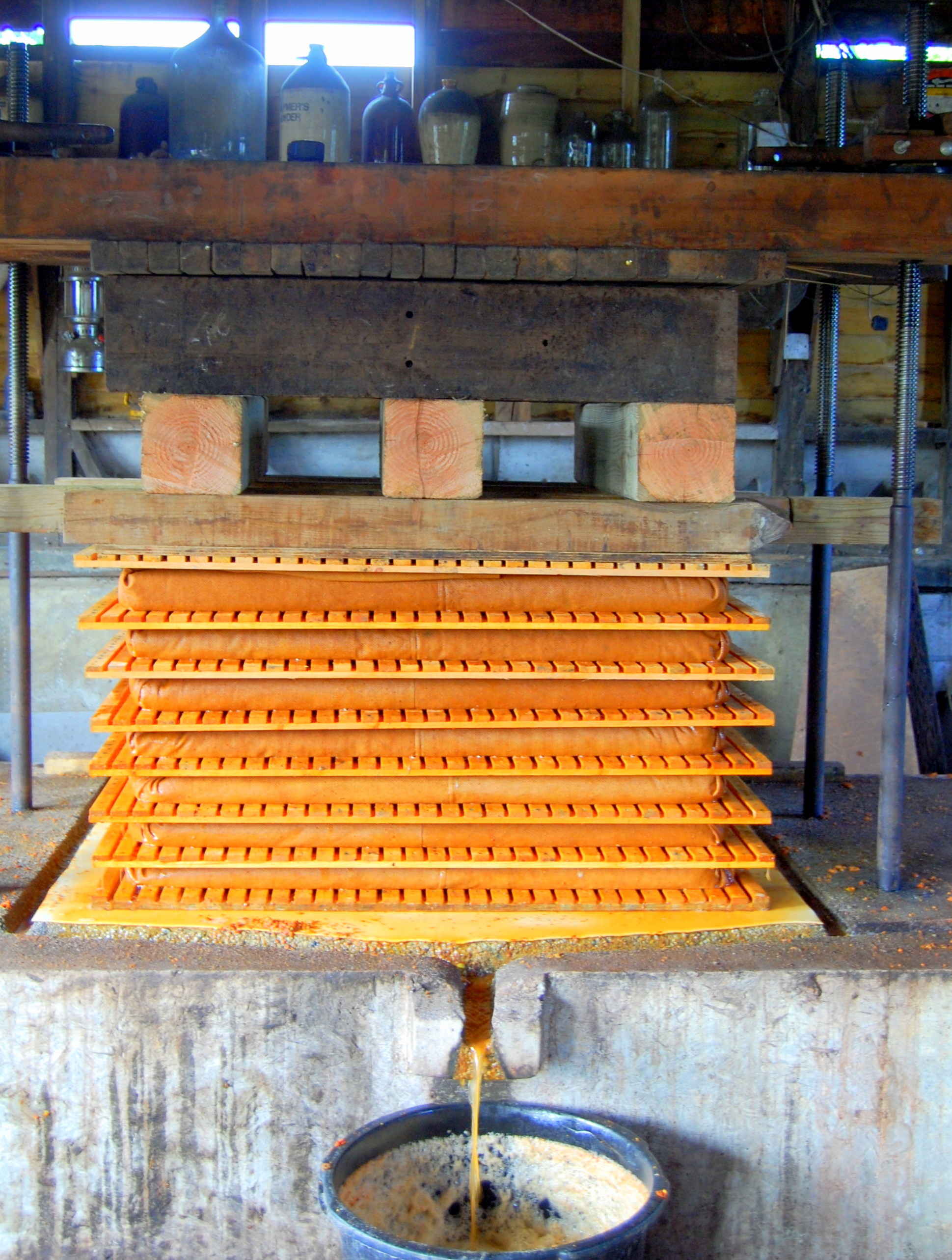
Cider press in use at St Mabyn Cornwall UK

A fruit press is a device used to separate fruit solids, such as stems, skins, seeds, pulp, leaves, and detritus, from fruit juice.

== History ==
In the United States, Madeline Turner invented the Turner's Fruit-Press, in 1916.

== Cider press ==
A cider press is used to crush apples or pears. In North America, the unfiltered juice is referred to as cider, becoming known as apple juice once filtered; in Britain it is referred to as juice regardless of whether it is filtered or not (the term cider is reserved for the fermented (alcoholic) juice). Other products include cider vinegar, (hard) cider, apple wine, apple brandy, and apple jack.

The traditional cider press is a ram press. Apples are ground up and placed in a cylinder, and a piston exerts pressure. The cylinder and/or piston in a traditional cider press is designed to allow the juice to escape while retaining the solid matter. This is achieved through a controlled gap or a semi-permeable surface, where the pressure exerted by the piston forces the juice out of the crushed apples or pears, leaving the solids behind. The traditional cider press has not changed much since the early modern period. The only difference being that in earlier versions of the press horses were used to power the machine. Diderot's Encyclopedie offers a portrayal of the traditional cider press,

"This is how the cider mill is made. Imagine a circular trough made of wood connected to two wooden millstones like those used in a windmill, but fixed differently. In a windmill, they are horizontal, but in the cider mill they are placed in the trough vertically. They are fixed to a vertical piece of wood that turns on itself and which is placed in the centre of the circular part of the trough; a long axle passes through them; the axle is joined to the vertical axis; its other end juts out from the trough; a horse → is harnessed to it; the ← horse → pulls the axle by walking round the trough, which also moves the pressing stones in the trough where the apples are pounded. When they are judged to be sufficiently crushed, that is to say, enough for all the juice to be extracted from them, the apples are removed with a wooden spade and put into a large vat nearby. Enough apples are pounded to make a pulp or pomace."

Cider presses often have attachments to grind the apples prior to pressing. Such combination devices are commonly referred to as cider mills.

In communities with many small orchards, it is common for one or more persons to have a large cider mill for community use. These community mills allow orchard owners to avoid the capital, space, and maintenance requirements for having their own mill. These larger mills are typically powered by electrical or gasoline engines. Mill operators also deal with the solids, which attract wasps or hornets. Cider mills typically give patrons a choice between paying by the gallon/litre or splitting the cider with the mill operator.

Larger orchardists may prefer to have their own presses because it saves on fees, or because it reduces cartage. Orchardists of any size may believe their own sanitation practices to be superior to that of community mills, as some patrons of community mills may make cider from low quality fruit (windfall apples, or apples with worms). Those making speciality ciders, such as pear cider, may want to have their own press.

The world's largest cider press is located in Berne, Indiana, US.

== Wine press ==
A wine press is a device used to press grapes during wine making.

== Oil press ==
An oil press is a device used to extract oil from plants and fruits.

== DIY fruit press ==
Given the simplicity of the design, and high usability, some people (e.g. those owning an orchard) have started building their own do-it-yourself (DIY) fruit press and have uploaded detailed instructions on how to do so.

== See also ==
- Cider mill
