= Charles FitzRoy-Scudamore =

British politician

Charles FitzRoy-Scudamore (c. 1713 – 22 August 1782) was a British politician who sat in the House of Commons for 49 years from 1733 to 1782.

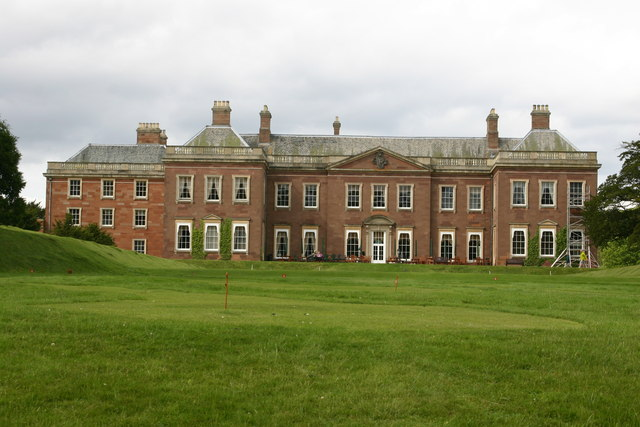
Holme Lacy House

Born Charles FitzRoy, he was the illegitimate son of Charles FitzRoy, 2nd Duke of Grafton, and was educated at Westminster School from 1721 to 1730. He married Frances Scudamore in 1744 after her divorce from Henry Somerset, 3rd Duke of Beaufort, in 1743. She was the only child and heir of James Scudamore, 3rd Viscount Scudamore, bringing him the Viscounts Scudamore seat of Holme Lacy. Fitzroy added the Scudamore name to his own on 22 March 1749.

He was Member of Parliament for Thetford (1733 to 1754), Hereford (1754 to 1768), Heytesbury (1768 to 1774) and Thetford again from 1774 to March 1782. Due to his continued forty-eight-year service in the British House of Commons, FitzRoy-Scudamore succeeded William Aislabie as Father of the House in 1781 but died a year later.

His only child, Frances (1750–1820), became the second wife of Charles Howard, 11th Duke of Norfolk, but became insane and was locked away for many years. After her death without children, the estate of Holme Lacy fell into extensive litigation, eventually settling on Sir Edwin Stanhope, 3rd Baronet, who adopted the additional surname Scudamore.

Parliament of Great Britain
Preceded by Robert Jacomb; Sir Edmund Bacon	Member of Parliament for Thetford; 1733–1754; With: Sir Edmund Bacon 1733–1739; Lord Augustus FitzRoy 1739–1741; Lord Henry Beauclerk 1741–1754	Succeeded by Lord Henry Beauclerk; Herbert Westfaling
Preceded by Henry Cornewall; Daniel Leighton	Member of Parliament for Hereford; 1754–1768; With: John Symons 1754–1764; John Scudamore 1764–1768	Succeeded by John Scudamore; Sir Richard Symons
Preceded by Pierce A'Court-Ashe; William A'Court-Ashe	Member of Parliament for Heytesbury; 1768–1774; With: William A'Court-Ashe	Succeeded by William A'Court-Ashe; Hon. William Gordon
Preceded by Henry Seymour Conway; Viscount Petersham	Member of Parliament for Thetford; 1774–1782; With: Hon. Charles FitzRoy 1774–1780; Richard Hopkins 1780–1782	Succeeded by Richard Hopkins; Earl of Euston
Court offices
Preceded by Thomas Archer	Groom Porter; 1743–1763	Succeeded by Francis Buller
Honorary titles
Preceded by William Aislabie	Father of the House; 1781–1782	Succeeded by The Earl Nugent
