= Kentchurch Court =

Grade I listed English country house in the United Kingdom

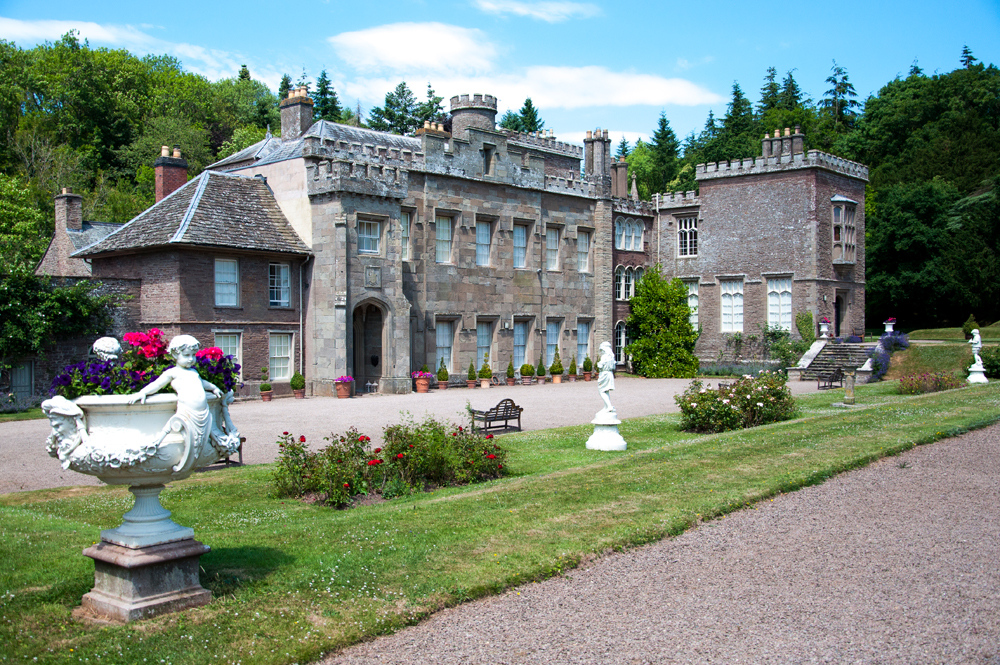

- Location within Herefordshire

General information
- Type: Stately home
- Location: Kentchurch, Herefordshire, England
- Coordinates: 51.928581°N 2.840475°W
- Inaugurated: 1052

Website
- https://kentchurch-estate.com/

Kentchurch Court is a Grade I listed stately home 1,200 yards (1,000 m) east from the village of Kentchurch in Herefordshire, England.

== History ==
It is the family home of the Scudamore family. Family members included Sir John Scudamore, who acted as constable and steward of a number of royal castles in south Wales at the start of the 15th century. He secretly married Alys, one of the daughters of Owain Glyndŵr, in 1410, and it has been suggested that the couple may have harboured Glyndŵr himself at Kentchurch after his disappearance around 1412, until his death.

The court is a Grade I listed building.

Kentchurch Court has been used as a filming location for several films and television series including The Vault of Horror, On the Black Hill and Regency House Party. In 2011, it was the subject of a documentary presented by hotelier Ruth Watson as part of her Country House Rescue series.

== See also ==
- Grade I listed buildings in Herefordshire
- List of country houses in the United Kingdom
