= St Cuthbert's Church, Holme Lacy =

Coordinates: 52.0094°N 2.6301°W

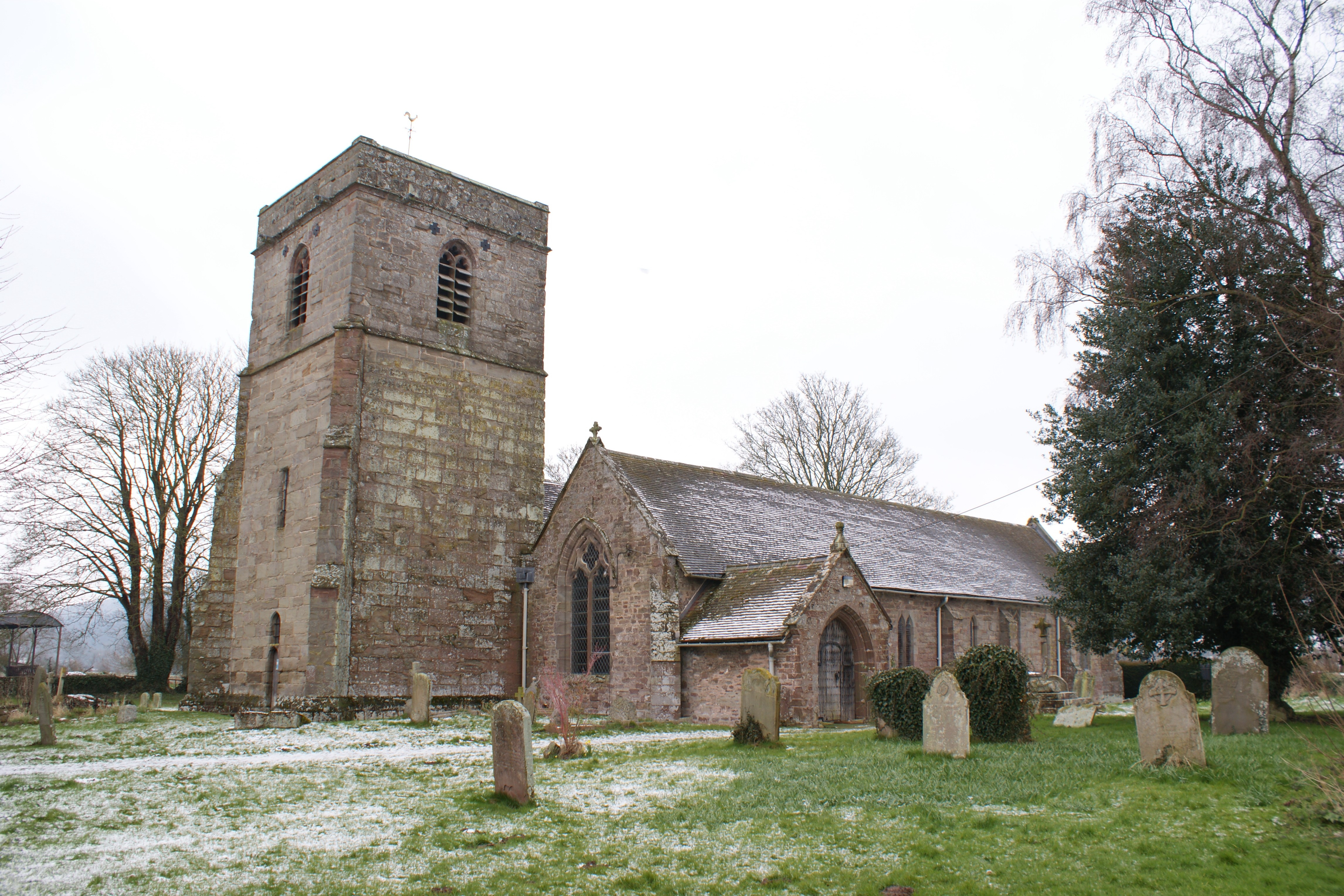
- St Cuthbert's Church, Holme Lacy, from the southwest

- Location in Herefordshire
- OS grid reference: SO 568 347
- Location: Holme Lacy, Herefordshire
- Country: England
- Denomination: Anglican
- Website: Churches Conservation Trust

History
- Dedication: Saint Cuthbert

Architecture
- Functional status: Redundant
- Heritage designation: Grade I
- Designated: 26 January 1967
- Architectural type: Church
- Style: Gothic
- Groundbreaking: 12th century
- Completed: 16th century

Specifications
- Materials: Sandstone, tile roofs

St Cuthbert's Church is a redundant Anglican church about 1 mile (1.6 km) to the southeast of the village of Holme Lacy, Herefordshire, England. It stands in an isolated position at the end of a lane in a bend of the River Wye. It is designated in the National Heritage List for England as a Grade I listed building, and is under the care of the Churches Conservation Trust.

== History ==
The land on which the church stands was given to Walter de Lacy by William the Conqueror, after the Norman conquest. The estate later passed by marriage to the Scudamore family, who became its patrons. It remained in their possession until 1909–10, when it was bought by Sir Robert Lucas-Tooth, 1st Baronet. The Domesday Book records a priest at Holme Lacy, which implies that a church was present at that time. The church is now in an isolated position, but earthworks in its vicinity suggest that a village existed nearby, which was subsequently deserted. The fabric of the present church originates from the 13th century. The tower was added in the 14th century, and a north chapel and south porch in the 16th century. In 1833 a gallery was built and an organ installed. By 1924 the gallery had been removed and the old organ replaced by a new one. During this year extensive repairs to the roof, arcade and floors were also carried out, at a cost of about £1,000 (equivalent to £53,000 in 2025).

== Architecture ==
=== Exterior ===
St Cuthbert's is constructed in sandstone with tiled roofs. Its plan consists of a six-bay nave with two-bay chancel, and a north chapel. It has a south aisle extending to a south chapel at its east end, and a south porch. At the west end is a tower. The tower is in three stages, the upper two being separated by a string course. There are diagonal buttresses at the northwest and southwest corners. On the west wall in the bottom stage is an arched doorway over which is a small arched window. Above this in the middle stage is another window, this one being square-headed. The upper stage contains an arched, louvred bell opening on each side of the tower. Above each bell opening is a pair of trefoil windows. The parapet is plain. Along the north wall of the nave are three pairs of windows; above the west pair is a gabled dormer. There is a pair of similar windows on the north wall of the chancel. The east window of the chancel has three lights, and there is a buttress between this and the two-light east window of the south chapel. There is a gable cross on the apex of the north chapel and the chancel. Along the south wall is a variety of windows, including two lancet windows. The west window of the aisle has two lights. The south porch contains benches along each side.

=== Interior ===
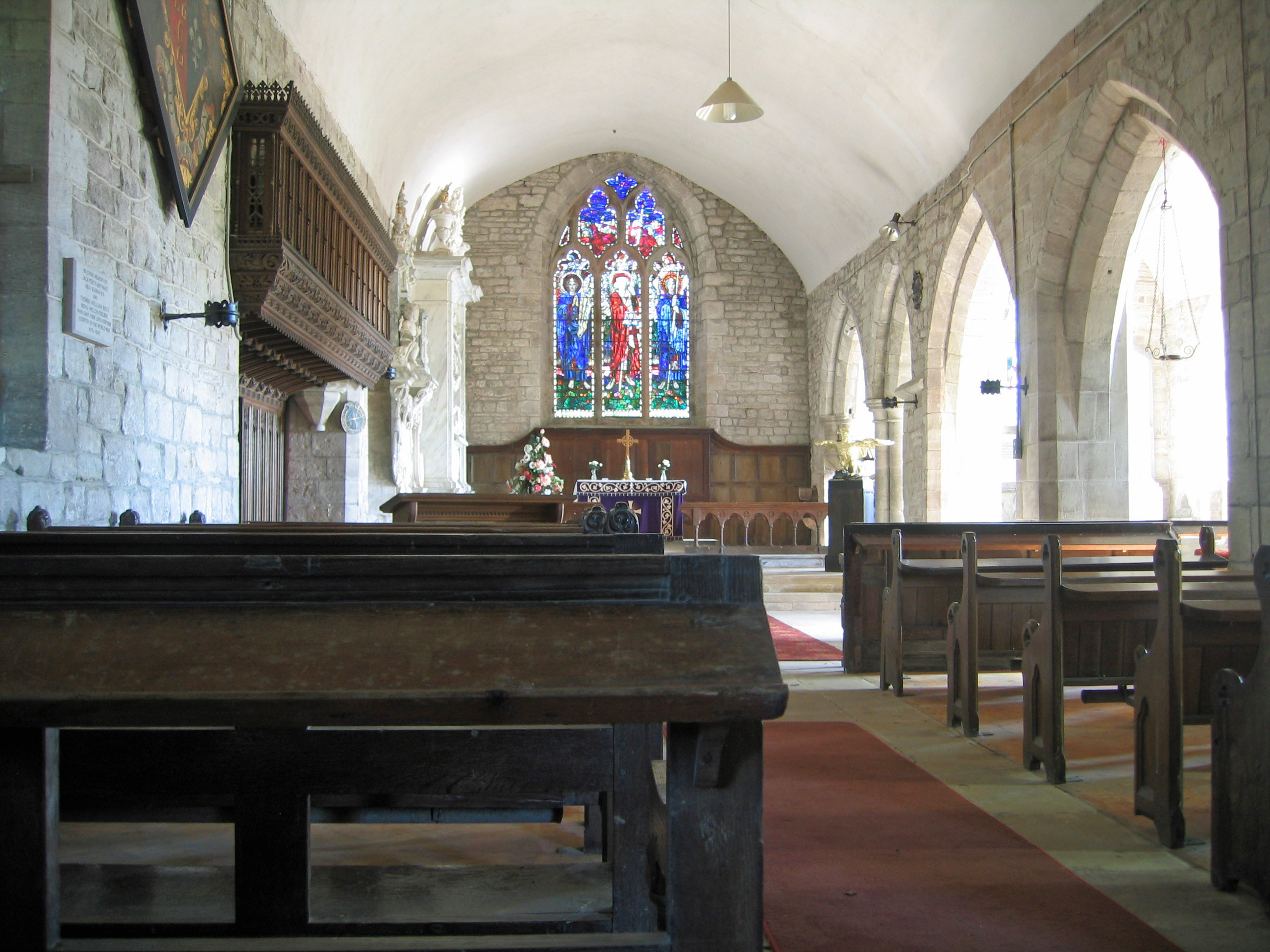
Interior of the nave

==== Fittings and furniture ====
The ceilings of the body of the church are plastered, while the wagon roof of the north chapel is open. Between the nave and the north chapel is a carved wooden screen. There is a piscina in the chancel, and another in the south chapel. The font dates from the 17th century, and consists of a round bowl on a cylindrical stem. It is carved with rosettes and cherubs. On the floor near the entry to the north chapel is a round stone bowl. The chancel contains a communion table dating from the 17th century, and on its east wall is panelling from the same period. In the church are two sets of choirs stalls dating possibly from the 15th century with misericords carved with such features as a grotesque head and a bird. There are other items from the 17th century, including carved benches, a chest and chairs. The lectern consists of a gilded eagle on an oak plinth dated 1914. On the walls are four hatchments, and near the south door is a benefactions board dated 1790. At the west end of the church is a two-manual organ. This was built in 1912 at a cost of £300 (equivalent to £29,600 in 2025), and was moved to the west end in 1924 at a cost of £36 (equivalent to £1,900 in 2025). There is a ring of eight bells. These were all cast by Rudhall of Gloucester, six of them in 1709 and the other two in 1808 and 1829.

==== Memorials ====
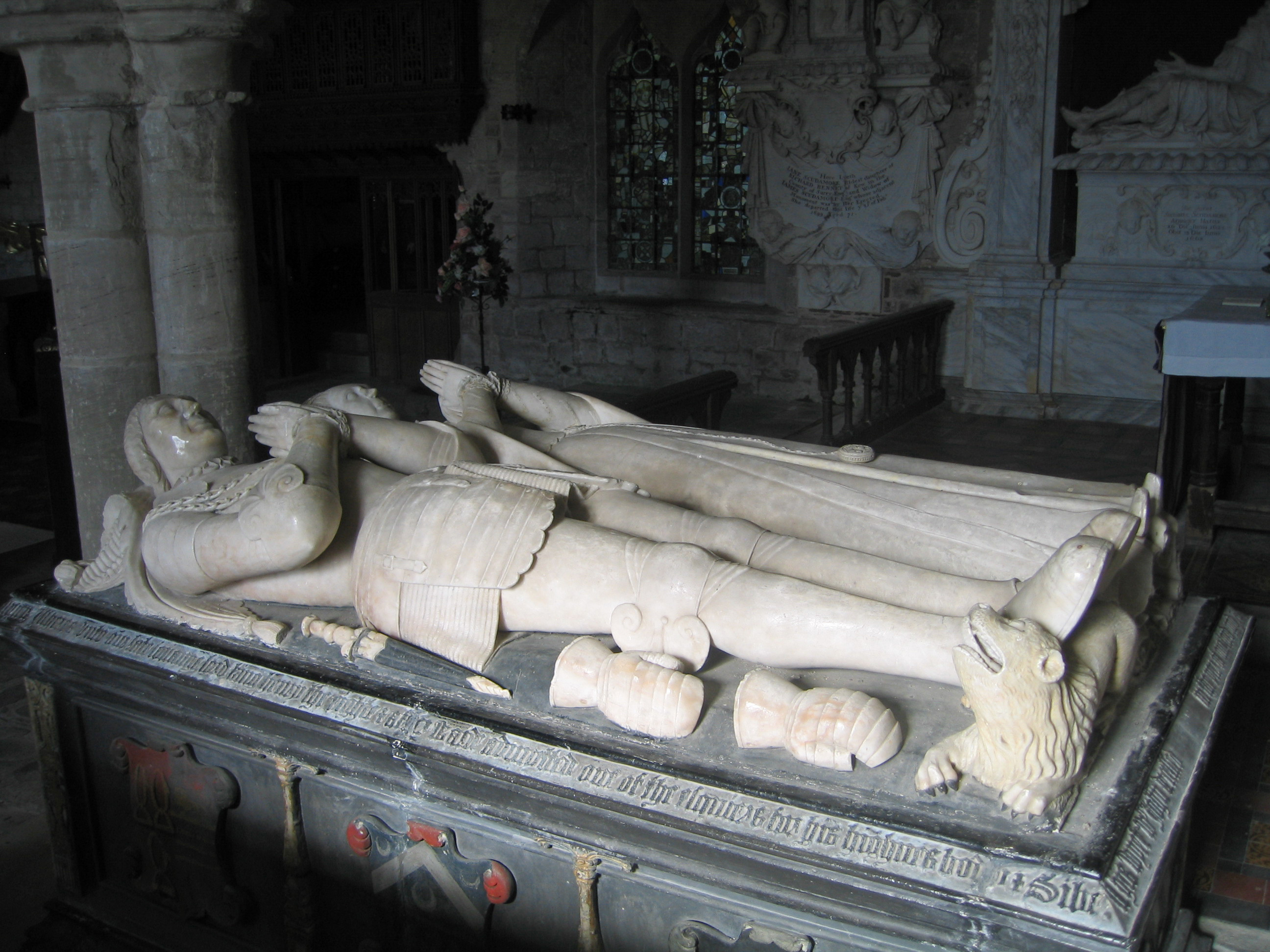
Tomb with effigies of John and Sibell Scudamore

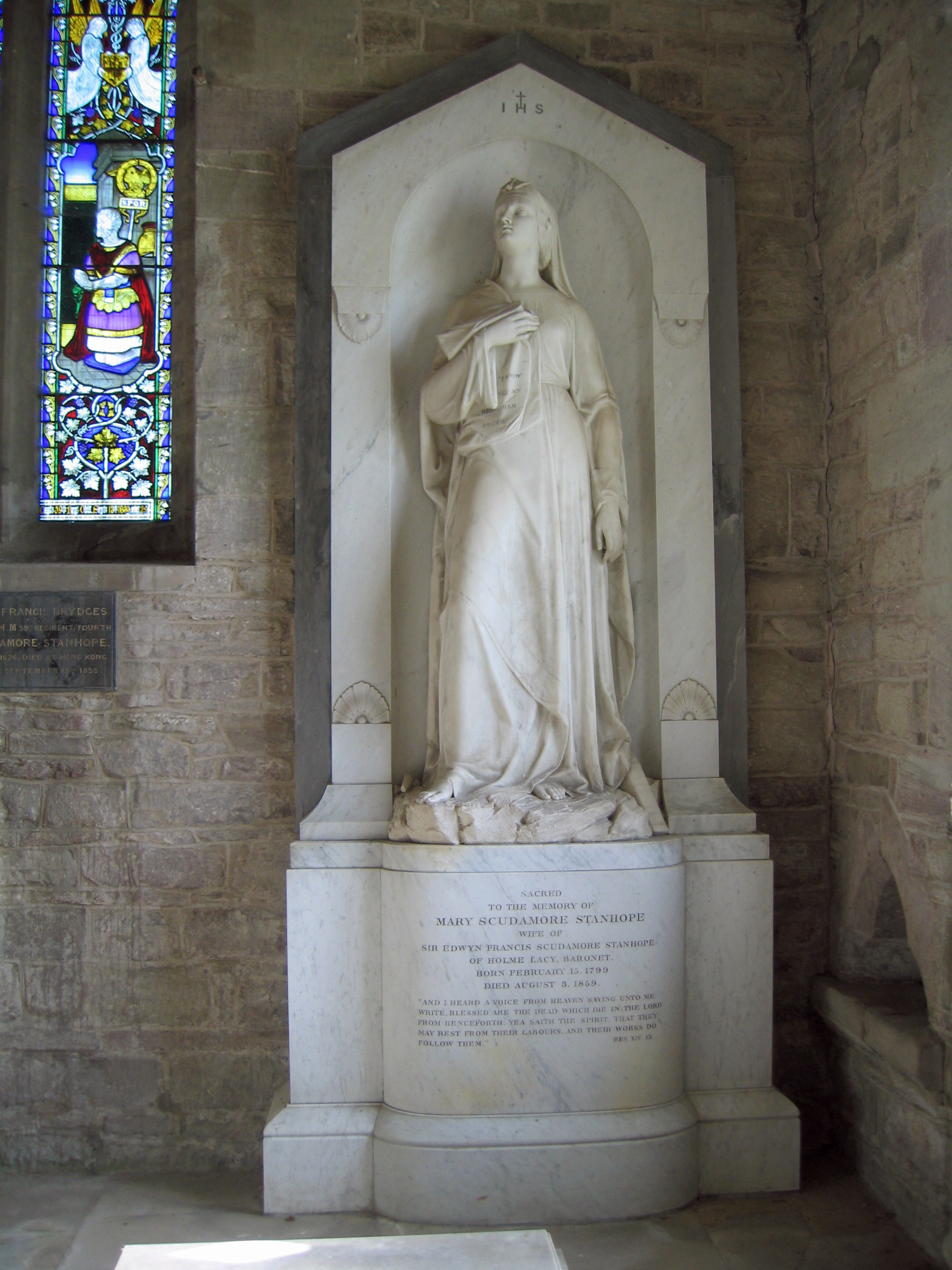
Memorial to Mary Scudamore Stanhope

Most of the memorials in the church are to the Scudamore family. Between the chancel and the south chapel is a chest tomb dating from around 1550 bearing the alabaster effigies of John Scudamore and his wife Sibell. John Scudamore is dressed in armour, and his feet rest on a lion; she is dressed in a long gown. Along the sides of the tomb are shields containing coats of arms. On the north wall of the chancel is the white marble monument in Baroque style to James Scudamore who died in 1668. It contains a sculpture representing James Scudamore in a sitting position, wearing Roman dress. Above his head are two cherubs, and the whole is framed between two pilasters. To the left of this monument is one to his widow, Jane, also in Baroque style. In the south aisle is a wall monument to James Scudamore, 3rd Viscount Scudamore who died in 1716. This consists of a sarcophagus on which is an urn and two seated putti. Lower down, on each side of the sarcophagus, are two wreathed skulls. The whole is surrounded by Ionic columns and a broken segmental pediment. On the east wall of the south chapel is a monument to Mary Scudamore Stanhope, wife of Sir Edwyn Francis Scudamore Stanhope of Holme Lacy, who died in 1859. This was sculpted by Matthew Noble in white marble, and depicts a female figure standing in a niche. In the north chapel is another marble wall monument by Noble. This was to Chandos Scudamore Stanhope, a captain in the Royal Navy who died in 1871 and consists of an angel above an anchor.

==== Stained glass ====
The glass in the east window of the south chapel depicts Cornelius and the angel, and is to the memory of Francis Brydges Scudamore Stanhope who died in 1855. In the east window of the chancel is a depiction of the Archangel Michael weighing souls and is to the memory of Sir Robert Lucas-Tooth who died in 1915. The north window of the chancel contains fragments of medieval glass. The east window of the south wall of the south aisle depicts the Good Samaritan and is a memorial to William Pitt Scudamore Stanhope who was vicar of the church from 1872 to 1892. In the north chapel is a window depicting Sir Galahad and Sir Bors to the memory of Sir Archibald Lucas-Tooth, 2nd Baronet who died in active service in the First World War in 1918. Also in the north chapel is a window commemorating Henry Scudamore-Stanhope, 9th Earl of Chesterfield who died in 1887.

== External features ==
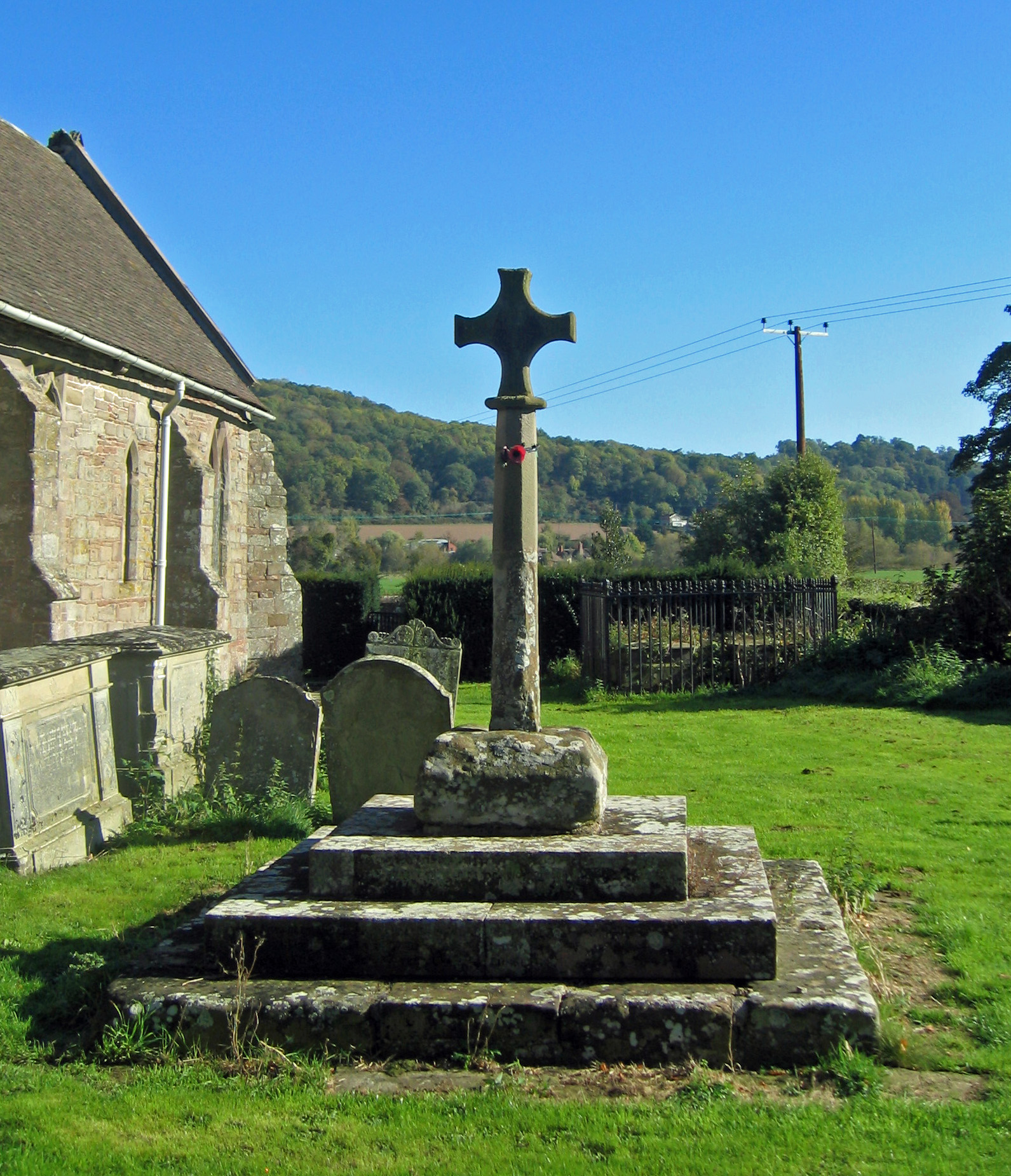
Churchyard cross

To the south of the church is a churchyard cross constructed in sandstone. Its oldest parts, the base and the lower part of the shaft, date probably from the 14th century. The three stone steps, the upper part of the shaft and the cross date from a 20th-century restoration. The cross is designated as a Grade II listed building. Also to the south of the church are three further items designated as Grade II listed buildings. To the east of the porch is a wide grave headstone dated 1660. Further to the west are two pairs of chest tombs. Those in the first pair are dated 1790 and 1847. The other pair are surrounded by railings and date from about 1835. To the east of the church are a gate with piers and attached walls. The gate and piers date probably from the later part of the 17th century, and the walls from later. The gates and the piers are in wrought iron, and the walls are sandstone. The overthrow contains an inscription and an achievement combining the Royal coat of arms and the arms of the Scudamore family. The gate, piers and walls constitute a Grade II* listed building. It is thought that they were moved from Holme Lacy House. To the north of the church tower is the war grave of a Canadian Army soldier of World War I.

== See also ==
- List of churches preserved by the Churches Conservation Trust in the English Midlands
