= James Scudamore, 3rd Viscount Scudamore =

English politician

James Scudamore, 3rd Viscount Scudamore (1684 – 2 December 1716), was an English landowner and Tory politician who sat in the House of Commons from 1705 to 1716.

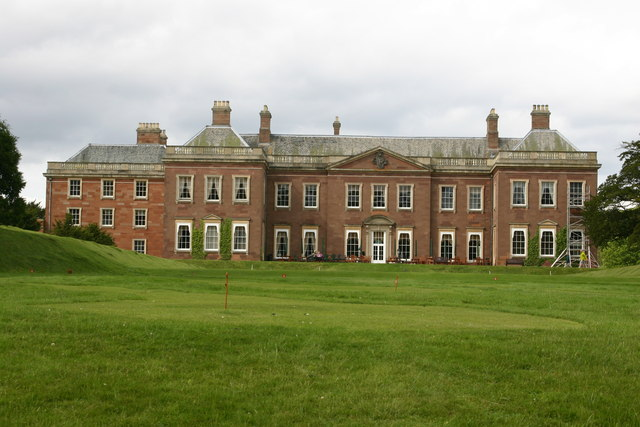
Holme Lacy

Scudamore was baptised on 15 July 1684, the second, but eldest surviving son of John Scudamore, 2nd Viscount Scudamore, and his wife Lady Frances Cecil, daughter of John Cecil, 4th Earl of Exeter. He matriculated at Gloucester Hall, Oxford in 1695 and was awarded DCL in 1712. He inherited the title Viscount Scudamore and the estate of Holme Lacy from his father in 1697. From 1698 to 1703, he travelled abroad in France, Italy, Holland, Germany, Austria and Switzerland. He married Frances Digby, daughter of Simon Digby, 4th Baron Digby on 7 March 1706.

Scudamore was returned unopposed as Tory Member of Parliament for Herefordshire at the 1705 general election. He was elected MP for Herefordshire again in a contest in 1708. In 1710 he suffered a severe fall from his horse when riding hurriedly to Hereford on electioneering business and suffered some impairment. Nevertheless, he was re-elected MP for Herefordshire at the 1710 general election and returned unopposed in 1713. At the 1715 general election, he changed seats and was elected MP for Hereford instead.

Scudamore died on 2 December 1716 from the effects of his fall from the horse. He and his wife had one daughter Frances (1711–1750), who married Henry Somerset, 3rd Duke of Beaufort, who divorced her in 1743 for adultery with William Talbot, 1st Earl Talbot. She remarried to Charles FitzRoy-Scudamore and had one daughter Frances (1750–1820), who married Charles Howard, 11th Duke of Norfolk but became insane.

Parliament of England
| Preceded by Sir John Williams, Bt; Henry Gorges | Member of Parliament for Herefordshire; 1705–1708; With: Henry Gorges | Succeeded by Parliament of Great Britain |
Parliament of Great Britain
| Preceded by Parliament of England | Member of Parliament for Herefordshire; 1708–1715; With: John Prise; Sir Thomas Morgan, Bt | Succeeded by Richard Hopton; Sir Thomas Morgan, Bt |
| Preceded by Hon. James Brydges; Thomas Foley | Member of Parliament for Hereford; 1715– 1716; With: Thomas Foley | Succeeded by Herbert Rudhale Westfaling; Thomas Foley |
Peerage of Ireland
| Preceded by John Scudamore | Viscount Scudamore; 1697–1716 | Extinct |
