= Frances Scudamore, Duchess of Norfolk =

Her Grace The Duchess of Norfolk
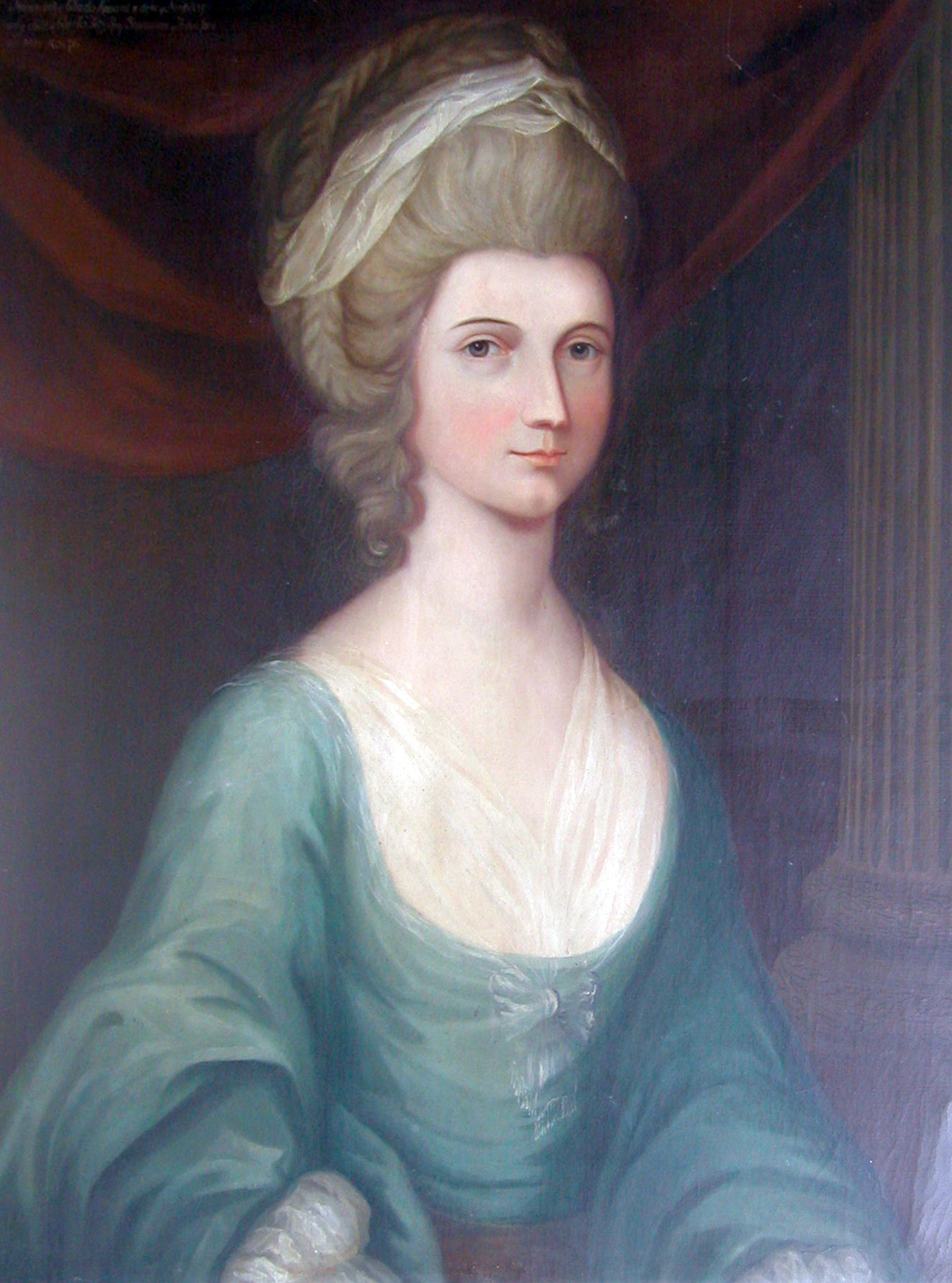
- Frances Scudamore, Duchess of Norfolk
- Born: 1750
- Died: 1821 (aged 70–71)
- Spouse: Charles Howard, 11th Duke of Norfolk (m. 1771; died 1815)
- Father: Charles FitzRoy-Scudamore
- Mother: Frances Somerset, Duchess of Beaufort

Frances Scudamore (1750–1820) was the second wife of Charles Howard, who became the 11th Duke of Norfolk in 1786. She spent her married life confined to Holme Lacy in a mentally deranged condition.

== Life ==
She was born the only daughter and heiress of Charles FitzRoy-Scudamore of Holme Lacy in Herefordshire, an illegitimate son of Charles FitzRoy, 2nd Duke of Grafton, and his wife Frances, the divorced wife of the 3rd Duke of Beaufort.

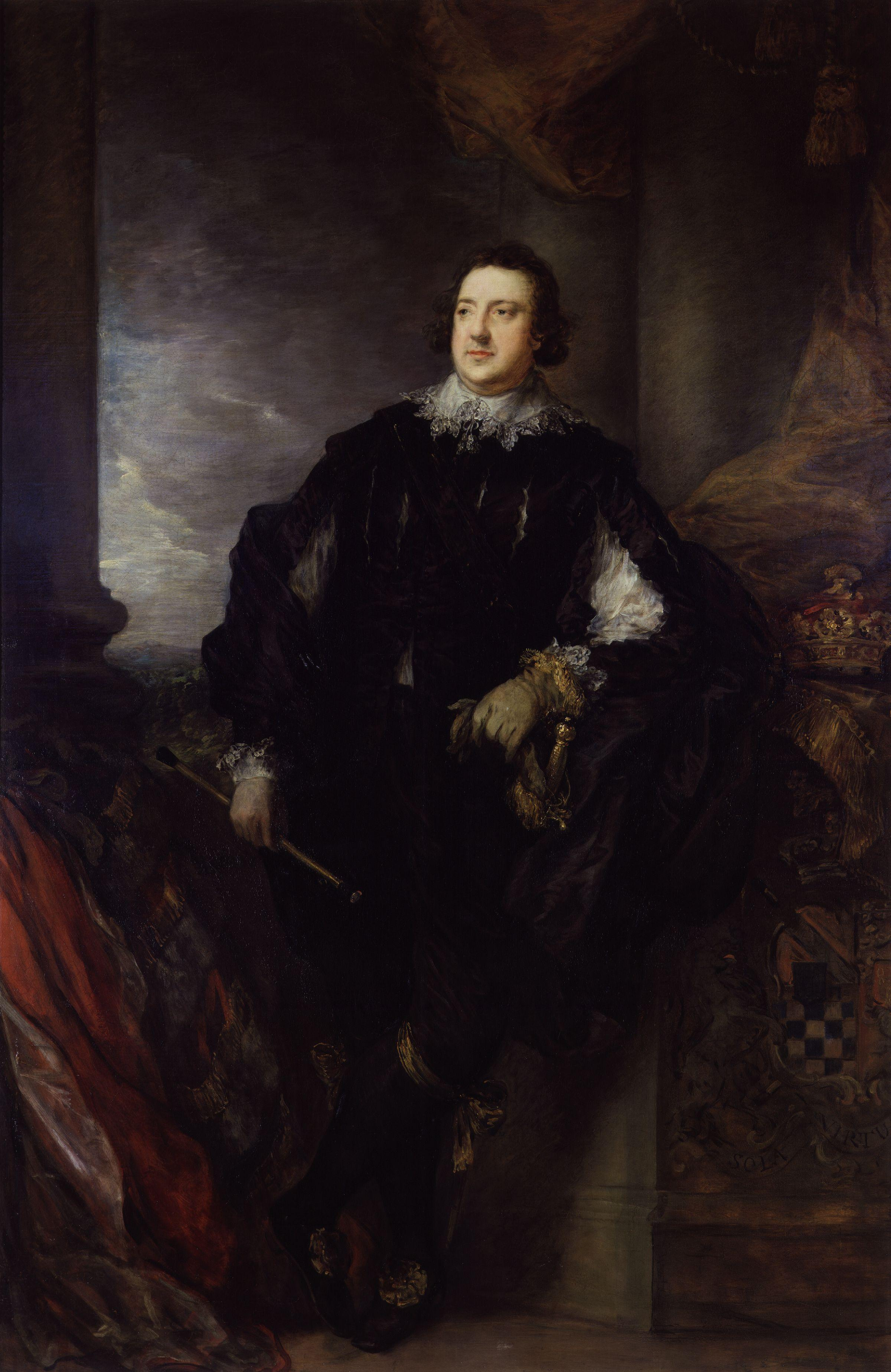
Charles Howard, 11th Duke of Norfolk by Thomas Gainsborough

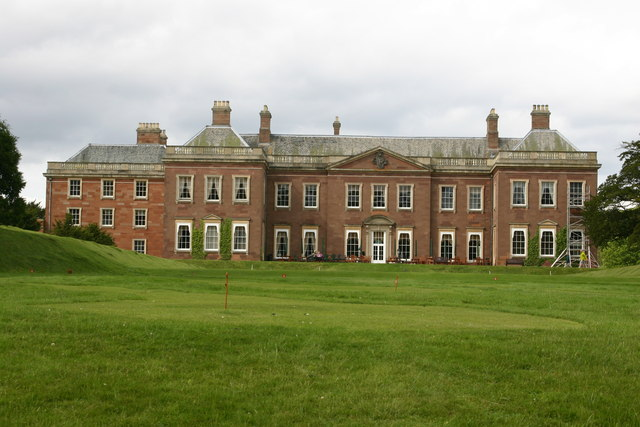
Holme Lacy House

She married Charles Howard, the only son and heir of the 10th Duke of Norfolk on 6 April 1771 in London. She inherited the Holme Lacy estate on the death of her father in 1782. Her husband succeeded his father as the 11th Duke of Norfolk on 31 August 1786, inheriting a number of large estates, including Arundel Castle, Worksop Manor, Greystoke Castle and Sheffield Manor.

Unfortunately, Frances exhibited signs of mental instability from the time of her marriage and spent the rest of her life confined to Holme Lacy. They had no children. Her husband spent his time elsewhere with a series of mistresses, dying in 1815.

She died a widow in 1820 and was buried at St Cuthbert's Church, Holme Lacy. Having had no legitimate heirs from either of his marriages the Duke's lands and titles had passed to his cousin Bernard. Holme Lacy, however, became the subject of a prolonged legal battle, which was finally decided in favour of Sir Edwin Stanhope, 2nd Baronet, who adopted the additional surname of Scudamore.
