= Frances Somerset, Duchess of Beaufort =

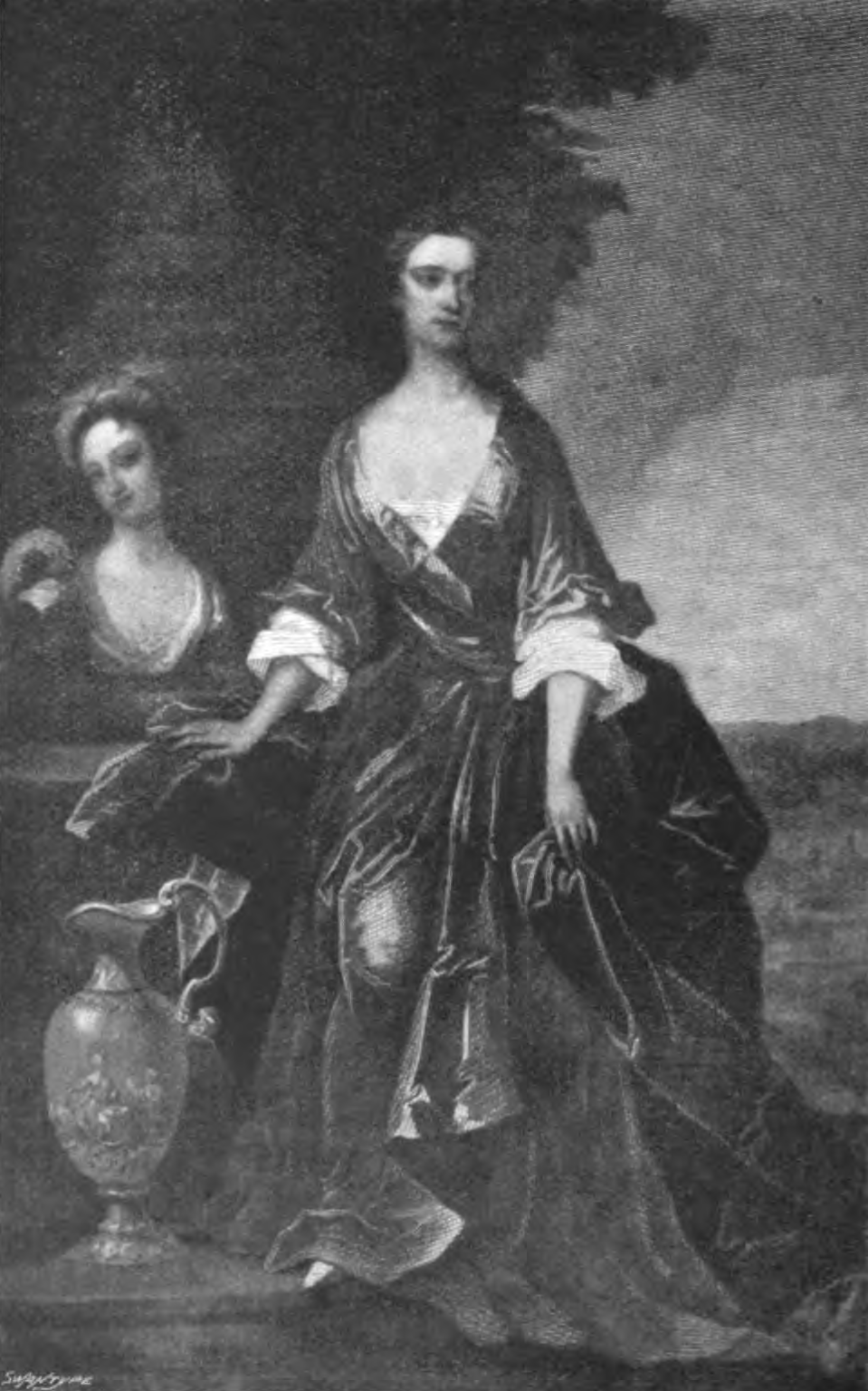
- Viscountess Scudamore and her daughter, portrait by Godfrey Kneller
- Born: Frances Scudamore; 1711
- Died: 1750 (aged 38–39)
- Spouse: Henry Scudamore, 3rd Duke of Beaufort (m. 1729; div. 1743) Charles FitzRoy-Scudamore (m. 1744)
- Children: Frances Scudamore, Duchess of Norfolk
- Parents: James Scudamore, 3rd Viscount Scudamore (father); Frances Digby (mother)

Frances Scudamore, Duchess of Beaufort (1711–1750) was a noblewoman and heiress. The only child of James Scudamore, 3rd Viscount Scudamore, she was his sole heir upon his death in 1716. Her mother, Frances née Digby, had introduced the family to Alexander Pope. Frances married, on 28 June 1729, Henry Somerset, 3rd Duke of Beaufort, who the following year took the surname Scudamore by a private act of Parliament, the Duke and Duchess of Beaufort's Name and Lord Scudamore's Estate Act 1729 (3 Geo. 2. c. 10 Pr.). The marriage was not a happy one, leading the Duchess to have an affair with William Talbot, 2nd Baron Talbot. In 1742, the Duke filed for divorce due to this affair; the Duchess countersued, claiming that the Duke was impotent. When the Duke disproved her claim before court-appointed examiners, the divorce was granted in March 1743, followed by the Duke suing Lord Talbot for damages.

The year after her divorce, Frances remarried, her second husband being Colonel Charles FitzRoy, an illegitimate son of the 2nd Duke of Grafton. Colonel FitzRoy also adopted the surname Scudamore after his own. They had one daughter, also named Frances, born in 1750, the year of her mother's death. The daughter Frances would go on to marry Charles Howard, 11th Duke of Norfolk, but became insane and was locked away for many years; after her death without children, the estate of Holme Lacy, formerly the property of the Viscounts Scudamore, fell into extensive litigation, eventually settling on Sir Edwin Stanhope, 3rd Baronet, who adopted the additional surname Scudamore.
