= Viscount Scudamore =

Title in the Peerage of Ireland

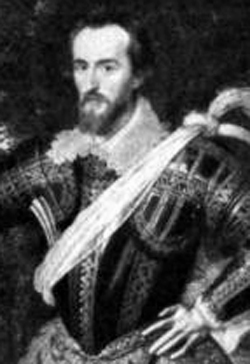
Sir James Scudamore, father of the first Viscount Scudamore

Viscount Scudamore was a title in the Peerage of Ireland held by three generations of the Scudamore family. It was created on 1 July 1628 for the diplomat and politician Sir John Scudamore, 1st Baronet. He had already been created a Baronet, of Holme Lacy in the County of Hereford, in the Baronetage of England on 1 June 1620, and was made Baron Dromore at the same time as he was granted the viscountcy, also in the Peerage of Ireland. Scudamore was the son of Sir James Scudamore and the grandson of Sir John Scudamore. Lord Scudamore was succeeded by his grandson, the second Viscount. He represented Hereford and Herefordshire in Parliament. On his death the titles passed to his son, the third Viscount. He was also Member of Parliament for Hereford and Herefordshire. The titles became extinct on his death in 1716.

The family seat was Holme Lacy, Herefordshire. The house later came into the Stanhope family headed by the Earl of Chesterfield.

== Viscounts Scudamore (1628) ==
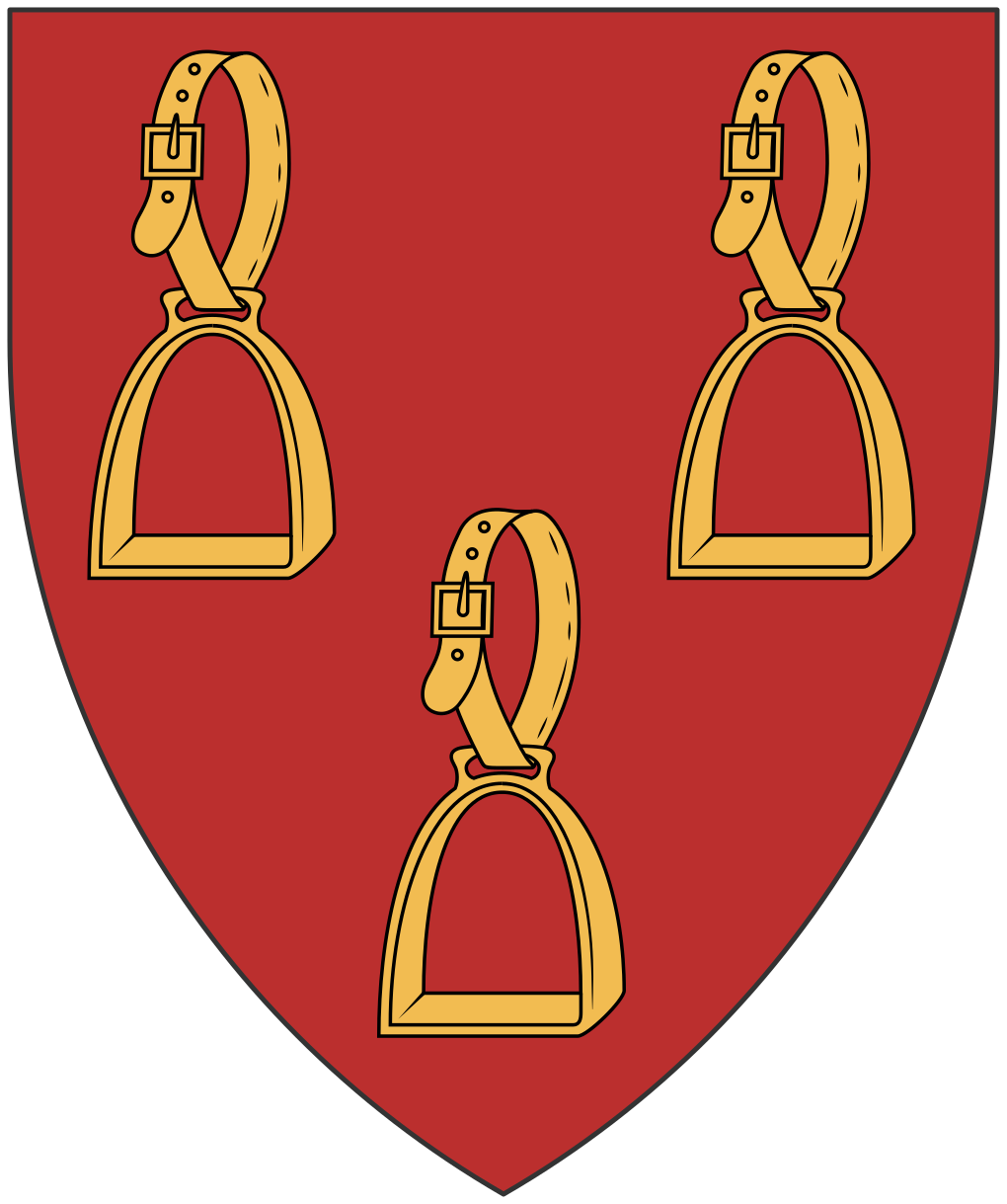
Arms of Scudamore, Viscount Scudamore

- John Scudamore, 1st Viscount Scudamore (1601–1671)
- John Scudamore, 2nd Viscount Scudamore (c. 1650–1697)
- James Scudamore, 3rd Viscount Scudamore (1684–1716)
