= Holme Lacy =

Village and civil parish in Herefordshire, England

Coordinates: 52°01′N 2°39′W

- Village and civil parish
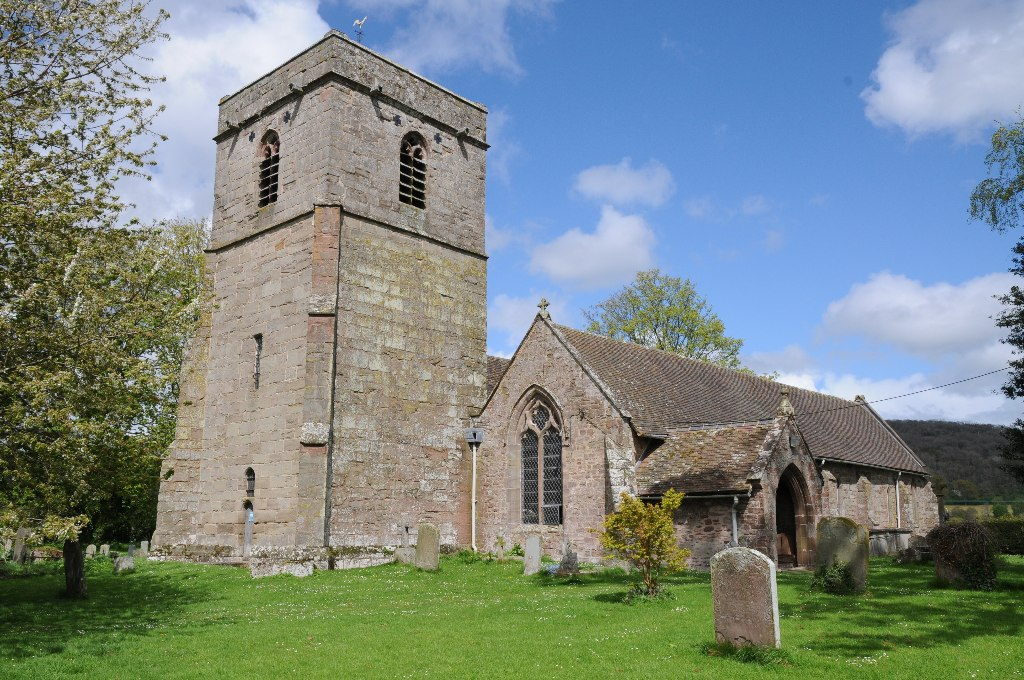
- St Cuthbert's Church, Holme Lacy

- Location within Herefordshire
- Population: 466 2011 Census
- Civil parish: Holme Lacy
- Unitary authority: Herefordshire
- Ceremonial county: Herefordshire
- Region: West Midlands
- Country: England
- Sovereign state: United Kingdom
- Post town: Hereford
- Postcode district: HR2
- Dialling code: 01432
- Police: West Mercia
- Fire: Hereford and Worcester
- Ambulance: West Midlands
- UK Parliament: Hereford and South Herefordshire

Holme Lacy is a village and civil parish in the county of Herefordshire, England. The population of the civil parish was 466 at the 2011 census.

== Etymology ==
The name of Holme Lacy is not from Old Norse holmr "island" like other places of the name Holme, but from the fairly similar Old English hamm "land in a river-bend". The name was recorded as Hamme in the Domesday Book in 1086. The name has varied through history; it has also been known as Homme Lacy (1396) Hamlayce (1648), Humlachie (1701) and Hom Lacy (1836).

== History ==
In 1086, as recorded in the Domesday Book, the village was an estate of the Bishop of Hereford and held by Roger de Lacy, which is where the "Lacy" affix comes from. De Lacy was a Lord of the manor, indicating that a feudal system was in existence during the Middle Ages. It was in Dinedor hundred in Herefordshire.

William I of England had returned Hamme to Bishop Walter and in 1086 the total population included:

- 16 villeins
- 4 bordars (Villeins of the lowest rank who held a cottage at their lord's pleasure, for which they rendered menial service)
- 1 reeve
- 1 male and 2 female slaves
- 1 priest
- and 1 Frenchman who between them had 20½ ploughs.

The presence of a priest is likely to indicate that there was a church at Holme Lacy. There were also two ploughs under the lordship's tenure in existence.

== St Cuthbert's Church ==
The grade I listed St Cuthbert's Church, which dates in part from the late 13th century, is a redundant church about one mile south east of the village. It has been under the care of the Churches Conservation Trust since 1994.

== Holme Lacy House and its estate ==
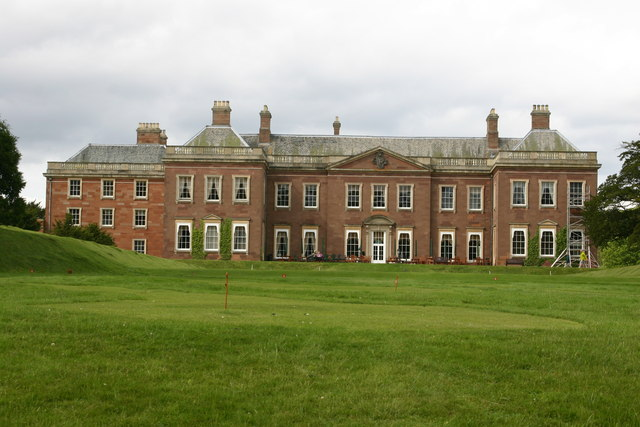
Holme Lacy House

Holme Lacy House is a grade I listed building, now a Warner Leisure Hotel.

Holme Lacy was for some centuries in the ancient family of Scudamore. Philip Scudamore settled here in the 14th century, and his descendant John Scudamore esq. was created a baronet in 1620, and in 1628 Baron Dromore and Viscount Scudamore, of Sligo. His successor, the second viscount, commissioned Anthony Deane in 1674 to build a new country mansion on the estate.

Holme Lacy House continued to be the principal seat of the family till the year 1716, when on the death of James, the 3rd and last Viscount Scudamore, the estate was vested in Frances Scudamore (born 1711-died 1750 in childbed), his only daughter and heiress. In 1729 Frances married Henry Somerset 3rd Duke of Beaufort, who in 1730 assumed the name and arms of Scudamore. Frances was divorced in 1744 and there were no children of the marriage.

Frances then married as her second husband Charles Fitzroy esq. He also assumed the name and arms of Scudamore, and had by her an only daughter and heiress, Frances (1750-1820). Frances married Charles Howard, 11th Duke of Norfolk to whom the property then in part descended, and, together with other valuable estates in this county and Gloucestershire, was added to the princely domain of the Howards.

The Duke and Duchess died without surviving children and after extensive litigation the Holme Lacy estate devolved in 1819 upon Capt. Sir Edwyn Francis Stanhope, Bart., R. N., who assumed the additional name and arms of Scudamore and whose son succeeded in 1883 as 9th Earl of Chesterfield.

The mansion of Holme Lacy built by the 2nd Viscount Scudamore remained, renovated in 1828-31 and again in the early 20th century, the family seat of the Earls of Chesterfield until 1902, when the contents were sold. In 1909 the house was sold to Sir Robert Lucas-Tooth, an Australian brewing millionaire. His heirs sold it in 1924 to Noel Wills, on whose death in 1929 his widow donated it to Herefordshire County Council. For some years it was used as a training college and psychiatric hospital. Several owners later it was leased to the Warner Leisure Hotels group.

== Holme Lacy Village Hall ==
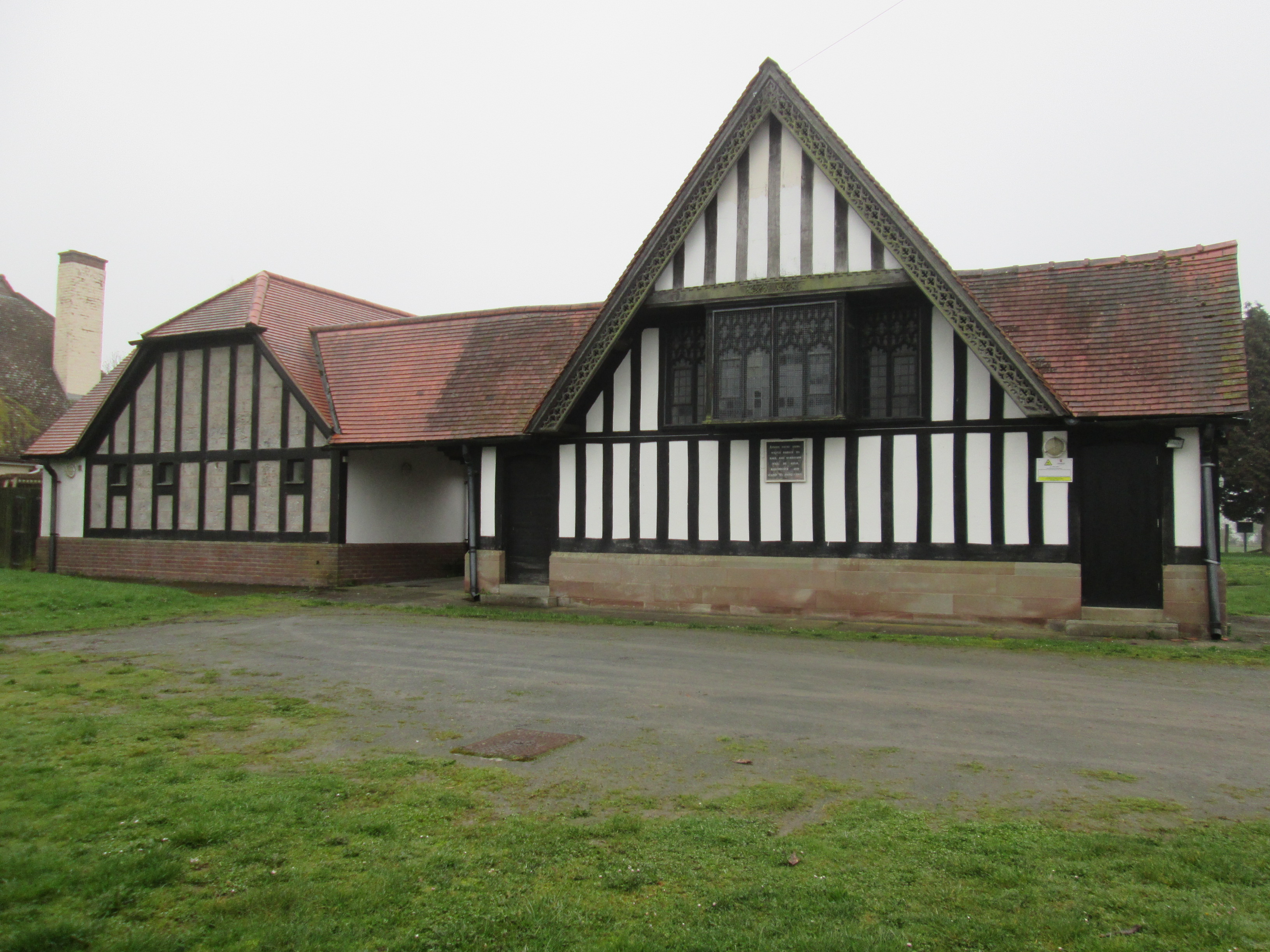
Holme Lacy Village Hall

Holme Lacy Village Hall is a half-timbered building in the village centre, built in the 1920s. It was a gift to the village from Lord and Lady Lucas-Tooth of Holme Lacy House, in memory of their two sons who were killed in World War I and who are commemorated on a plaque inside the hall. The hall is a registered charity, and is used for a range of activities including coffee mornings, line-dancing, and wedding receptions; it is also the home of Holme Lacy football club.

== Prynce's Holme Lacy Charity ==
The Prynce's Holme Lacy Charity and the Lady Jane Scudamore Charity are registered charities in England. The charity believes that everyone deserves the opportunity to thrive. Their mission is to provide financial support to individuals facing hardship, empowering them to improve their quality of life and achieve their full potential. Through grants for essential needs and educational support, they help residents overcome financial barriers and help students access the education they deserve. By fostering hope and opportunity, they create a brighter future for individuals and the community alike.

== Record pear tree ==
A perry pear tree in the vicarage garden, next to the church, was the largest recorded internationally at the time. The Holme Lacy Pear, which still partly survives, covered three quarters of an acre and yielded a crop of 5–7 tons in 1790.

== Railways ==
Holme Lacy railway station was located on the Hereford to Gloucester section of the Hereford, Ross and Gloucester Railway. It was opened on 1 June 1855 as a 7 ft (2,134 mm) broad gauge line, it was amalgamated with the Great Western Railway in 1862. In 1869 the railway was converted to 4 ft 8 1/2 in (1,435 mm) standard gauge. The railway was closed to passengers on 2 November 1964.
