= John Scudamore =

John Scudamore may refer to:

- John Scudamore (landowner), of the 15th century, MP
- John Scudamore (1503–1571) (1503–1571), MP for Herefordshire, 1529
- Sir John Scudamore (courtier) (1542–1623), MP for Herefordshire, 1571 to 1593 and 1597 to 1601.
- John Scudamore, 1st Viscount Scudamore (1601–1671), diplomat and politician,
- John Scudamore, 2nd Viscount Scudamore, (1650-1697) British Member of Parliament for Herefordshire
- John Scudamore (1727–1796), British Member of Parliament for Hereford
- John Scudamore (1757–1805), British Member of Parliament for Hereford
