= Custos Rotulorum of Herefordshire =

Civic post in Herefordsire, England

This is a list of people who have served as Custos Rotulorum of Herefordshire.

- John Scudamore bef. 1544
- Richard Warnecombe bef. 1544–1547
- John Scudamore (died 1571) 1547–1571
- Sir James Croft bef. 1573 –1574
- Sir John Scudamore 1574–1616
- Sir James Scudamore 1616–1619
- Sir John Scudamore 1619–1622
- John Scudamore, 1st Viscount Scudamore 1622–1646, 1660–1671
- Edward Harley Mar–July 1660
- Henry Somerset, 1st Duke of Beaufort 1671–1689
- Charles Gerard, 1st Earl of Macclesfield 1689–1694
- Thomas Coningsby, 1st Earl Coningsby 1696–1721

For later custodes rotulorum, see Lord Lieutenant of Herefordshire.
