= John Scudamore (courtier) =

English politician

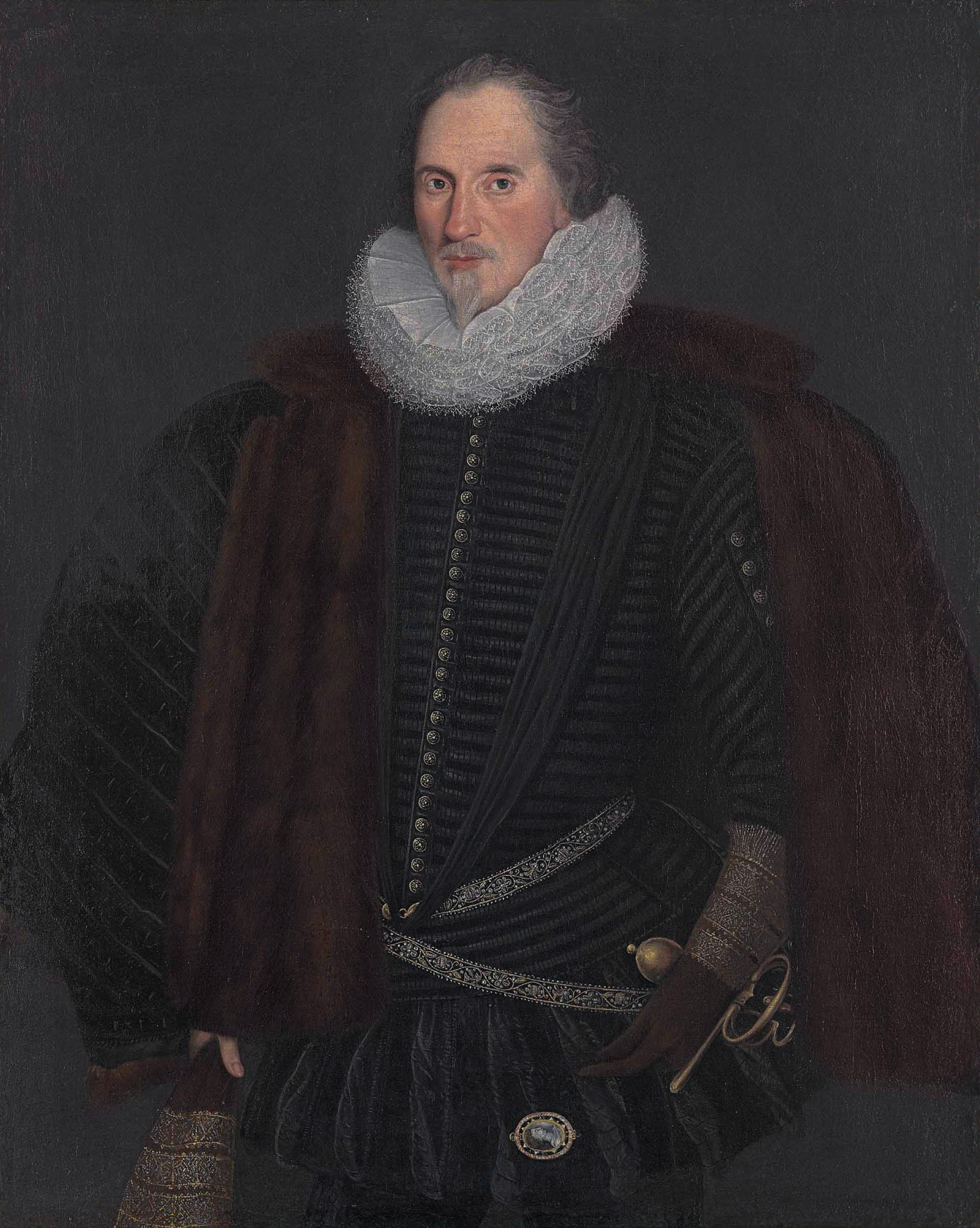
John Scudamore of Holme Lacy, Herefordshire (English School of circa 1590)

John Scudamore (1 February 1542 – 14 April 1623) was an Elizabethan landowner, courtier, and politician.

He was the eldest son of William Scudamore (d. 1560) of Holme Lacy and Ursula (d. 1558), the daughter and co-heiress of Sir John Pakington. His father died while he was still a minor and his wardship was purchased by Sir James Croft of Croft Castle, Herefordshire, who married him to his daughter Eleanor Croft (d. 1569) in 1562.

The close relationship between Scudamore and his father-in-law continued after Eleanor's death and when Croft became a Comptroller of the Household in 1570, Scudamore accompanied him to court. By 1573 he was a Gentleman Usher to Queen Elizabeth and in 1599 Standard Bearer to The Honourable Band of Gentleman Pensioners.

Inheriting the family estate on the death of his grandfather John Scudamore (died 1571) He became Custos Rotulorum of Herefordshire in 1574, deputy lieutenant in 1575 and served as High Sheriff of Herefordshire in 1581. He was elected knight of the shire for Herefordshire for six terms, sitting continuously from 1571 to 1589 and again in 1597.

He wed his second wife, Mary Scudamore, daughter of Sir John Shelton of Norfolk and a member of the queen's privy chamber, secretly in late 1573 or early 1574 because the queen disliked her ladies getting married.

On his death he was succeeded by his grandson John, his son James having predeceased him. Another son John Scudamore als Wiseman became a Jesuit priest.

== Notes ==
Political offices
Preceded by Sir James Croft	Custos Rotulorum of Herefordshire; 1574–1616	Succeeded by Sir James Scudamore
