= James Croft =

English politician, Lord Deputy of Ireland (died 1590)

Sir James Croft PC (c.1518 – 4 September 1590) was an English politician, who was Lord Deputy of Ireland, and MP for Herefordshire in the Parliament of England.

== Life ==
He was born the second but eldest surviving son of Sir Richard Croft of Croft Castle and his second wife Catherine Herbert, daughter of Sir Richard Herbert of Herefordshire, inheriting the estate on his father's death in 1562.

He was elected eight times as knight of the shire (MP) for Herefordshire (1542, 1563, 1571, 1572,1584, 1586 and 1589) and knighted in 1547.

During the Anglo-Scottish war of the Rough Wooing, Sir James was made commander of Haddington after James Wilford was captured in 1549. He was appointed lord deputy of Ireland on 23 May 1551. There he effected little beyond gaining for himself the reputation of a conciliatory disposition. On 21 December 1551, he wrote from Kilmainham to his former enemy Mary of Guise in Scotland, negotiating an exchange of hostages;

"Consydering the peaxe betwext the king my master and your grace, with the honnour that I had of your highness when I was at Haddington, it hath made me the bolder to become an humble suiter to your grace."

In January 1552 he was commissioned to look into the state of mining in Ireland and a controversy between the miners Robert Recorde and Joachym Goodenfynger. He acquired Tintern Abbey which later passed to the Colclough Baronets.

Croft was imprisoned in the Tower at the accession of Mary, for his support of Lady Jane Grey. He had been arrested by an officer of the Council of Wales on 21 February 1553. On his release he joined with Wyatt's rebellion. He was pardoned, and subsequently treated with consideration by Elizabeth after her accession.

He was made governor of Berwick upon Tweed, where he was visited by John Knox and James MacGill in 1559, and where he busied himself actively on behalf of the Scottish Protestants. Croft advised Knox and Master Robert Hamilton to return to Scotland, as the spies of Mary of Guise were active in England, and preachers so scarce in Scotland. As a commander of English forces at the Siege of Leith in May 1560, he was suspected, probably with good reason, of treasonable correspondence with Mary of Guise, the Catholic regent of Scotland. The Duke of Norfolk blamed him for a failed assault on 7 May 1560, later writing, "I thought a man could not have gone nigher a traitor than Sir James, I pray God make him a good man." For ten years he was out of public employment but in 1570 Elizabeth, who showed the greatest forbearance and favour to Sir James Croft, made him a privy councillor and controller of her household.

He was one of the commissioners for the trial of Mary, Queen of Scots, and in 1588 was sent on a diplomatic mission to arrange peace with the duke of Parma in a complex scheme. Croft established private relations with Parma, for which on his return he was sent to the Tower. He was released before the end of 1589, and died on 4 September 1590. He was buried at Westminster Abbey.

== Family ==
Croft had married twice, firstly Alice, daughter of Richard Warnecombe of Ivington near Leominster and widow of William Wigmore of Shobdon with whom he had three sons (including Edward and James) and four daughters and secondly Catherine, the daughter of Edward Blount. His eldest son, Edward, was put on trial in 1589 on the curious charge of having contrived the death of Robert Dudley, 1st Earl of Leicester by witchcraft, in revenge for the earl's supposed hostility to Sir James Croft. A younger son of Edward was Sir Herbert Croft, whose son Herbert Croft was Bishop of Hereford. Croft has many descendants, including his 13 great grandson Jack Cowey

Government offices
Preceded by Anthony St Leger	Lord Deputy of Ireland; 1551–1552	Succeeded by Lords Justices
Honorary titles
Preceded by Sir John Scudamore	Custos Rotulorum of Herefordshire bef. 1573 – bef. 1577	Succeeded by Sir John Scudamore
