= John Scudamore (1503–1571) =

English politician

John Scudamore (1503–1571), was an English landowner and politician.

He was the son of William Scudamore of Holme Lacy, Herefords. and Alice, daughter of Richard Mynors of Treago Castle, Herefords. He served as a gentleman usher to Henry VIII. In 1529 he represented Herefordshire in parliament.

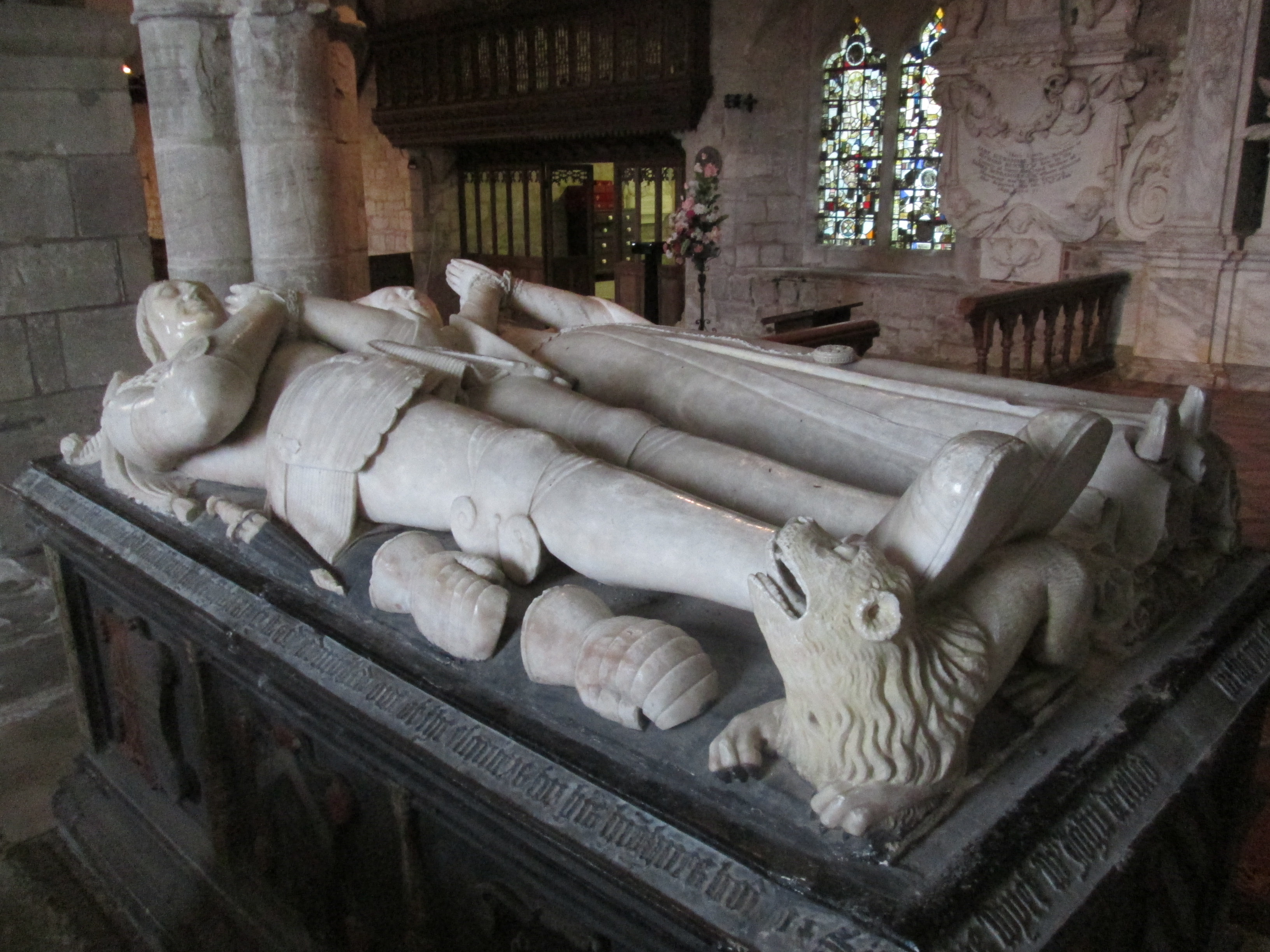
Monument to John and Sybil Scudamore at St Cuthbert's Church, Holme Lacy

He was buried at Holme Lacy, where an inscription mentions his service to Henry VIII as one of the four ushers and as a squire of the king's body.

== Marriages and children ==
He married twice. His first wife and the mother of his children was Sybil, daughter of Watkin Vaughan of Lower Hergest, Herefs. His second wife was Jane, daughter of William Rudhall of Rudhall, Brampton Abbotts, Herefs. and widow of Richard Rede of Boddington, Gloucestershire.

His eldest son William married Ursula Pakington daughter of John Pakington of Westwood, but dying before his father, the heir was his grandson John.
