= Seymour (surname) =

- Arms of Seymour: Gules, two wings conjoined in lure or
- Pronunciation: /ˈsiːmɔːr/ Scots: [ˈseɪmɔːr]

Origin
- Language: Anglo-Norman
- Meaning: 'of Saint-Maur' (place)

Seymour is an English toponymic surname.

Some Seymours are of French-Canadian origin who changed their name from Simard to Seymour once they have moved to the USA.

Notable individuals with this surname include:

- A. J. Seymour (1914–1989), Guyanese poet, essayist, memoirist and editor
- Alan Seymour (1927–2015), Australian playwright and writer
- Algernon Seymour (disambiguation)
- Archibald Seymour, 13th Duke of Somerset (1810–1891)
- Beauchamp Seymour, 1st Baron Alcester (1821–1895), British admiral
- Benjamin Seymour (c. 1806–1880), Canadian politician
- Brett Seymour (born 1984), Australian rugby league player
- Cara Seymour (born 1964), English actress
- Carolyn Seymour (born 1947), English actress
- Charles Seymour (disambiguation)
- Claire Seymour (1970–2024), English educator, violinist and music reviewer
- Cy Seymour (1872–1919), American Major League Baseball player
- David Seymour (disambiguation)
- Edward Seymour (disambiguation)
- Elijah Seymour (born 1998), Caymanian footballer
- Elizabeth Seymour (disambiguation)
- Eliza Seymour Lee (1800–1874), American pastry chef and restaurateur
- Eleanor Seymour (born in 2003) British artist and writer
- Evelyn Seymour, 17th Duke of Somerset (1882–1954)
- Felipe Seymour (born 1987), Chilean football player
- Forrest W. Seymour (1905–1983), American journalist
- Frances Seymour (disambiguation)
- Francis Seymour (disambiguation)
- Frederick Seymour (1820–1869), Irish-born colonial administrator, Governor of the Colony of British Columbia
- George Seymour (disambiguation)
- Gerald Seymour (born 1941), British writer
- Gordon Seymour, pseudonym of Charles Waldstein (1856–1927), Anglo-American archaeologist and short story writer
- Henry Seymour (disambiguation)
- Hezekiah C. Seymour (1811–1853), American civil engineer, New York State engineer and surveyor
- Horatio Seymour (disambiguation)
- Hugh Seymour (disambiguation)
- Ian Seymour (born 1998), American baseball player
- James Seymour (disambiguation)
- Jane Seymour (disambiguation)
- John Seymour (disambiguation)
- Katie Seymour (1870–1903), British burlesque and vaudeville entertainer
- Kelly Seymour (1936–2019), South African cricketer
- Ken Seymour (born 1930), Australian rules footballer
- Kevon Seymour (born 1993), American football player
- Lynn Seymour (1939–2023), Canadian ballerina and choreographer
- Mark Seymour (born 1956), Australian musician
- Mark Seymour (1897–1952), English golfer
- Mary Seymour (1548–1550?), daughter of Catherine Parr and Thomas, 1st Baron Seymour of Sudeley
- Mary Foot Seymour (1846–1893), American law reporter, business woman, school founder, journalist
- Matthew Seymour (1669–1735), member of the Connecticut House of Representatives from Norwalk, Connecticut, and founding settler of Ridgefield, Connecticut
- Maxine Seymour, Bahamian politician
- Michel Seymour (born 1954), Canadian philosopher and professor
- Michael Seymour (disambiguation)
- Miranda Seymour (born 1948), English literary critic, novelist, and biographer
- Naomi Seymour (born 1938), Bahamian politician
- Nic Seymour (born 1998), Professional Video Game Designer
- Nick Seymour (born 1958), Australian bass guitarist
- Paul Seymour (American football) (born 1950), American footballer
- Paul Seymour (mathematician) (born 1950), mathematician
- Paul Seymour (basketball) (1928–1988), American basketball player and coach
- Percy Seymour, 18th Duke of Somerset (1910–1984)
- Phil Seymour (1952–1993), American power pop musician
- Phil Seymour (American football) (1947–2013), American football player
- Richard Seymour (born 1979), former American National Football League player
- Richard Seymour (18th-century writer) (died c.1750), English editor and author
- Richard Seymour (21st-century writer) (born 1977), British Marxist writer
- Ruth Seymour (1935–2023), American retired public radio station manager
- Ryan Seymour (born 1990), American National Football League player
- Sally Seymour (died 1824), American pastry chef and restaurateur
- Sebastian Seymour, Lord Seymour (born 1982), heir apparent to the title of Duke of Somerset
- Silas Seymour (1817–1890), American engineer, New York State Engineer and Surveyor
- Silas J. Seymour (1824–1899), American politician
- Stephanie Kulp Seymour (born 1940), U.S. court of appeals judge
- Stephanie Seymour (born 1968), supermodel
- Terri Seymour (born 1973), British television presenter and sometime actress
- Thaddeus Seymour (1928–2019), American educator
- Tom Seymour (chief executive), disgraced head of PWC Australia
- Thomas Seymour (disambiguation)
- Truman Seymour (1824–1891), American Civil War general and painter
- Webb Seymour, 10th Duke of Somerset (1718–1793)
- Whitney North Seymour (1901–1983), American lawyer
- Whitney North Seymour Jr. (1923–2019), American politician
- William Seymour (disambiguation)

== See also ==
- Admiral Seymour (disambiguation)
- General Seymour (disambiguation)
- Judge Seymour (disambiguation)
- Justice Seymour (disambiguation)
- Senator Seymour (disambiguation)
- Seymour-Conway (disambiguation), a list of people with the surname
- Elizabeth Handley-Seymour (c. 1873–1948), English fashion designer
- Martin Seymour-Smith, English writer
- Thomas Seamer (1632–1712), founding settler of Norwalk, Connecticut
- Serano Seymor (born 2002), Dutch footballer
