= Hungerford (surname) =

Hungerford is a surname. Notable people with the surname include:

- Agnes Hungerford (died 1523), Englishwoman convicted of murdering her first husband, John Cotell
- Adrianna Hungerford (1858–1946), American temperance activist, leader
- Allyn Merriam Hungerford (1810–1883), American physician, Connecticut legislator, and judge
- Anne Hungerford (1525–1603), English courtier and poet
- Anthony Hungerford (Roundhead) (c.1614–1657), New Model Army officer
- Anthony Hungerford of Black Bourton (1567–1627), MP for Marlborough and Great Bedwyn, religious controversialist
- Anthony Hungerford of Down Ampney (c.1492–1558), English soldier and courtier, MP for Gloucestershire
- Brett Hungerford (born 1969), Australian rules footballer
- Bruce Hungerford aka Leonard Hungerford (1922–1977), Australian pianist
- David Hungerford (1927–1993), American cancer researcher
- Edmund Hungerford, MP for Marlborough in 1586
- Edward Hungerford (disambiguation), several people
- Ed V. Hungerford III, American particle physicist
- George Hungerford (1637–1712), MP for Cricklade, Calne and Wiltshire
- George Hungerford (born 1944), Canadian lawyer and Olympic rower
- Giles Hungerford (1614–1685), English lawyer, MP for Whitchurch
- Harold Hungerford (1908–1972), Australian politician in Queensland
- Henry Hungerford (1611–1673), English politician, MP for Great Bedwyn, Wiltshire and Marlborough
- Herbert Barker Hungerford (1885–1963), American entomologist
- J. Edward Hungerford (1883–1964), American silent film screenwriter
- John Hungerford (disambiguation), several people
- Margaret Wolfe Hungerford (1855–1897), Irish novelist
- Mary Hungerford (c.1648–1533), English noblewoman
- Orison Whipple Hungerford, Jr. (1930–2017), stage name Ty Hardin, American actor
- Orville Hungerford (1790–1851), American politician from New York
- Ralph Hungerford (1869–1977), American politician
- Robert Hungerford (disambiguation), several people
- Sara Hungerford (born 1986), Australian cricketer
- Thomas Hungerford (disambiguation), several people
- Tom Hungerford (1915–2011), Australian writer
- Walter Hungerford (disambiguation), several people
- Wilson Hungerford (1884–1969), Unionist politician in Northern Ireland

== See also ==
- Baron Hungerford
- Baron Portal of Hungerford
