= Anthony Hungerford =

Anthony Hungerford may refer to:

- Sir Anthony Hungerford of Down Ampney (bapt. 1492–1558), MP for Gloucestershire
- Sir Anthony Hungerford of Black Bourton (1564–1627), religious controversialist, father of the Royalist
- Anthony Hungerford (Royalist) of Black Bourton (1607/8–1657), Member of Parliament and Royalist
- Anthony Hungerford (Roundhead) (1614/15?–1657), officer of Parliamentary forces during the English Civil War
