= John Seymour =

John Seymour may refer to:

== Courtiers and politicians ==
- John Hayward (MP for Bridport) (c. 1355–1407), alias Seymour, member of parliament for Bridport, U.K.
- John Seymour (MP for Bristol) (fl. 1351), member of parliament for Bristol, U.K.
- John Seymour (1425–1463), British landowner and member of parliament
- John Seymour (died 1464), British knight and member of parliament
- John Seymour (died 1491) (1450s–1491), member of the British landed gentry and grandfather of Queen Jane Seymour
- Sir John Seymour (1474–1536), father of Queen Jane Seymour, third wife of Henry VIII of England
- John Seymour (died 1567), member of parliament for Great Bedwyn, U.K.
- John Seymour (died 1552), member of parliament for Wootton Bassett, U.K.
- John Seymour (died 1618), member of parliament for Great Bedwyn, U.K.
- John Seymour, 4th Duke of Somerset (before 1646–1675), British peer and member of parliament
- John Seymour (Maryland governor) (1649–1709), royal governor of the Maryland colony in the Americas, then part of England
- John Seymour (Gloucestershire MP) (died 1663), member of parliament for Gloucestershire
- John Seymour (California politician) (1937–2026), senator from California, U.S.
- John Seymour, 19th Duke of Somerset (born 1952), British landowner and elected hereditary peer
- John Webb Seymour (1777–1819), English aristocrat and amateur geologist

== Others ==
- John Seymour (priest) (died 1501), Canon of Windsor
- John Seymour (cricketer) (1881–1967), British cricketer
- John Alfred Seymour (1881–1934), Canadian Presbyterian minister in Australia
- John Laurence Seymour (1893–1986), American composer
- John Seymour (author) (1914–2004), British author and influential figure in the self-sufficiency movement

== See also ==
- Seymour (disambiguation)
- Seymour (surname)
