= George Ferrers =

Member of the Parliament of England

Member of Parliament
- In office 1542–1555
- Constituency: Plymouth; Cirencester; Barnstaple; Brackley; St Albans

Personal details
- Born: c. 1500
- Died: 1579 (aged ~78–79)
- Education: University of Cambridge

George Ferrers (c. 1500 – 1579) was a courtier and writer. In an incident which arose in 1542 while he was a Member of Parliament for Plymouth in the Parliament of England, he played a key role in the development of parliamentary privilege.

As a writer, he is best remembered for his contributions to The Mirror for Magistrates. He apparently wrote plays for court performance, and was particularly praised as a writer of tragedies, but these were never published and are now lost.

== Life ==
George Ferrers was the eldest son of Thomas Ferrers of St Albans and his wife, Alice, the daughter of John Cockworthy of Cockworthy, Devon. He is said to have graduated as a bachelor of canon law at the University of Cambridge before being admitted to Lincoln's Inn on 22 November 1534. There is no evidence that he followed a legal career, although he was a frequent litigant, and was praised by John Leland for his oratory at the bar.

According to Bindoff and Woudjuysen, Ferrers's literary interests were initially legal and antiquarian. It was apparently Ferrers who in 1533 edited and translated The Great Boke of Statutes which spanned the period from the first year of Edward III to the twenty-fifth year of the reign of Henry VIII. His translation of Magna Carta and other statutes was published in 1534. He may also have been the George Ferras who supplied Leland with information about the poet John Gower.

By 1538 Ferrers had entered the service of Henry VIII's chief minister, Thomas Cromwell. After Cromwell's fall, Ferrers entered the King's service, and was present at the reception of the King's fourth wife, Anne of Cleves. From at least 1542 to 1547 he was a page of the chamber, and in 1544 attended the King in France. When Henry VIII died on 28 January 1547, he left Ferrers a small bequest in his will.

=== Parliamentary career and the "Ferrers Case" of 1543 ===
Ferrers sat as a member of parliament for Plymouth in 1542, 1545 and 1553, for Cirencester in 1547, for Barnstaple in April 1554, Brackley in November 1554 and 1555 and for St Albans in 1571.

The most notable episode in Ferrers's political career has become known as 'Ferrers Case'. In March 1542 Ferrers was arrested for a debt of '200 marks or thereabouts' for which he had stood surety for one White of Salisbury on a loan from one Weldon, and put in the Counter, a debtors' prison in Bread Street. The arrest had been effected while Ferrers was on his way to the House of Commons, and Ferrers' fellow members ordered the Serjeant-at-Arms to obtain Ferrers' release. According to Holinshed:

there ensued a fray within the Counter gates between Ferrers and the officers, not without hurt of either part, so that the serjeant was driven to defend himself with his mace of arms, and had the crown thereof broken off by bearing off a stroke, and his man struck down.

The two sheriffs of London arrived, but when the Serjeant demanded Ferrers' release, the sheriffs, according to Holinshed, treated the request "contemptuously, with many proud words".

Weldon, the creditor who had instigated the arrest, and the two sheriffs and others were then summoned before the Commons on 28 March 1542 to answer charges of breach of parliamentary privilege, and were committed to the Tower for two days. The matter was referred to the Privy Council, and the King claimed privilege for his servants' attendance upon the business of parliament, stating that:

We be informed by our judges that we at no time stand so highly in our estate royal as in the time of Parliament, wherein we as head and you as members are conjoined and knit together into one body politic, so that whatsoever offence or injury during that time is offered to the meanest members of the House is to be judged as done against our person and the whole court of Parliament.

The incident thus established the immunity of members of the Commons from civil arrest while the House was in session.

=== Later career and work in entertainment ===
During the Scottish campaign of 1547 Ferrers was a commissioner of transport, and is described by William Patten in The Late Expedition in Scotland as being at the time 'a gentleman of my lord Protectors'. Ferrers survived Somerset's downfall in October 1549 and execution in January 1552, and was appointed by the Duke of Northumberland to devise entertainments to amuse the young King Edward VI during the Christmas season of 1551–2 as the Lord of Misrule. The then Master of the Revels, Sir Thomas Cawarden (a former fellow page of the chamber with Ferrers), was told by Northumberland to assist Ferrers. Material relating to the preparation of the entertainments is in the Revels accounts in the Loseley manuscripts (now in the Folger Shakespeare Library). The Acts of the Privy Council record that Northumberland paid Ferrers £50, and that the entire entertainment cost about £500. Ferrers is reported by the chronicler Richard Grafton to have outdone his predecessors:

in shew of sundry sightes and devises of rare invention, and in act of divers enterludes and matters of pastime, played by persons, as not onely satisfied the common sorte, but also were very well liked and allowed by the counsayle and other of skill in the like pastimes.

Ferrers was reappointed as Lord of Misrule to devise entertainments during the 1552-1553 Christmas season, and as in the previous year there were jousting, a mock midsummer show, a visit to the city of London, and various masques, and on Twelfth Night a triumph of Cupid, Venus, and Mars, devised by Sir George Howard, Master of the Henchmen, and produced by Ferrers. Ferrers was rewarded by a grant of an estate at Flamstead. He was again reappointed during the Christmas season of 1553–4 by the new Queen, Mary I.

=== Involvement in Wyatt's Rebellion and with John Dee ===
In 1554 Ferrers was awarded £100 for services during Wyatt's rebellion.

In spring and early summer 1555 Ferrers, with John Prideaux, accused John Dee and his associates, including Sir Thomas Benger, of conjuring, casting nativities, plotting on behalf of Princess Elizabeth against King Philip and Queen Mary, and bewitching Ferrers's children. On or about 26 May 1555 Dee was arrested, and he and his associates were later imprisoned. On 4 June the Privy Council sought information concerning Ferrers's own whereabouts. After this incident there is little trace of Ferrers, and no record that he was at court during Queen Elizabeth's reign, although he was appointed escheator for Bedfordshire and Buckinghamshire in 1562–3 and for Essex and Hertfordshire in 1566–7.

=== Literary career and last years ===
According to Woudhuysen, 'William Baldwin was instrumental in the creation of Ferrers's largest surviving literary work, his contributions to The Mirror for Magistrates, in which he was also associated with Sir Thomas Chaloner and Thomas Phaer'. Woudhuysen conjectures that Ferrers wrote several pieces for a suppressed edition of The Mirror for Magistrates published about 1554 which survives only in fragments. The 1559 edition includes his tragedies of Tresilian and Thomas of Woodstock, but his other contributions were suppressed in that edition, and not printed until several years later.

According to John Stow, Ferrers wrote the part of Richard Grafton's Chronicle (1568–9) dealing with the reign of Queen Mary, an allegation which Grafton denied, but Stow insisted upon. Stow and Grafton were in dispute, as Grafton had plagiarised part of Stow's own chronicle history of England. Bindoff states that Ferrers "almost certainly wrote a number of masques and plays for performance at court and elsewhere" which are lost. Ferrers also contributed verses to Leicester's lavish entertainment of Queen Elizabeth at Kenilworth Castle in July 1575.

Confusion concerning Ferrers' literary career was engendered in 1589 by the author of The Arte of English Poesie (thought to be George Puttenham), who in comparing Ferrers to other poets of the reign of Edward VI stated that he was "the principal man in this profession", and in relation to the others "a man of no less mirth & felicity … but of much more skill, & magnificence in his meter, and therefore wrate for the most part to the stage, in Tragedy and sometimes in Comedy or Interlude, wherein he gave the king so much good recreation, as he had thereby many good rewards". Puttenham later praised Lord Buckhurst and Ferrers "for tragedy", saying that "for such doings as I have seen of theirs [they] do deserve the highest praise". Unfortunately in both statements Puttenham erroneously gave Ferrers the first name Edward, spelling his name "Edward Ferrys". This misidentification was copied by Francis Meres in his Palladis Tamia in 1598, and repeated by later historians and literary critics until corrected by Sir Sidney Lee in the Dictionary of National Biography.

Little is known of Ferrers' last years. Ferrers had been a member of Parliament for several constituencies during the years 1542–1555, and in 1571 he was returned for St Albans. He is said to have supported the claim to the succession of Mary, Queen of Scots, and to have corresponded with her agent in England, John Lesley, Bishop of Ross. Ferrers died at Flamstead in Hertfordshire, and was buried there on 11 January 1579.

== Marriages and issue ==
Ferrers' first wife was Elizabeth, the widow of his friend Humphrey Bourchier (d.1540), whom he married by 10 December 1541. On 29 July 1548 he obtained the reversion of her right to the lease of Markyate Priory. His second wife was Jane, the daughter of John Southcote of St Albans, whom he married by licence dated 5 March 1546, and with whom he had a son, Julius. Ferrers married, as his third wife, by licence dated 29 November 1569, Margaret Preston, by whom he had at least three other sons and two daughters.
