= Seymour (given name) =

Seymour is a given name. Notable people and fictional characters with the name include.

== People ==
- Philip Seymour Hoffman (1967–2014), American actor
- Seymour Bathurst, 7th Earl Bathurst (1864–1943), British soldier and newspaper owner
- Seymour Benzer (1921–2007), American physicist, molecular biologist and behavioral geneticist
- Seymour Bernstein (1927–2026), American pianist, composer, and teacher
- Seymour Bowman (1621–1704), English politician
- Seymour Cassel (1935–2019), American actor
- Seymour Cocks (1882–1953), British Labour Party Member of Parliament
- Seymour Cray (1925–1996), American supercomputer architect and founder of Cray Research
- Seymour Chwast (born 1931), American graphic designer, illustrator and type designer
- Seymour Ginsburg (1927–2004), American computer scientist
- Seymour Greenberg (1920–2006), American tennis player
- Seymour Halpern (1913–1997), US Representative from New York
- Seymour Hersh (born 1937), Pulitzer Prize-winning investigative journalist and author
- Seymour Hicks (1871–1949), British actor, music hall performer, playwright, screenwriter, theatre manager and producer
- Seymour King (1852–1933), English banker, mountaineer and Conservative politician
- Seymour H. Knox I (1861–1915), American entrepreneur and businessman
- Seymour H. Knox II (1898–1990), American philanthropist and art enthusiast
- Seymour H. Knox III (1926–1996), American philanthropist and owner of the National Hockey League Buffalo Sabres team
- Seymour P. Lachman (1933–2025), New York politician and historian
- Seymour Liebergot (1936) "Sy" Liebergot, American electrical engineer, NASA EECOM during the Apollo program, NASA flight controller
- Seymour Martin Lipset (1922–2006), American political sociologist
- Seymour Melman (1917–2004), American professor, economist, writer and gadfly of the military-industrial complex
- Seymour Milstein (1920–2001), American real estate developer and philanthropist
- Seymour Nebenzal (1899–1961), German film producer
- Seymour Nurse (1933–2019), Barbadian cricketer
- Seymour Papert (1928–2016), South Africa-born American mathematician, computer scientist and educator
- Seymour Schulich (born 1940), Canadian businessman, investor, author and philanthropist
- Seymour Siegel (1927–1988), American Conservative rabbi, professor and adviser to three US presidents
- Seymour Slive (1920–2014), American art historian, especially on Rembrandt and Frans Hals
- Seymour Stedman (1871–1948), American civil liberties lawyer and a leader of the Socialist Party of America
- Seymour R. Thaler (1919–1976), New York state senator
- Seymour Topping (1921–2020), American journalist and writer
- Seymour Whinyates (1895–1978), British violinist

== Fictional characters ==
- Seymour d'Campus, University of Southern Mississippi mascot
- Seymour Glass, in the Glass Family series by J. D. Salinger
- Seymour Guado, in Final Fantasy X
- Seymour Krelborn, the main character in The Little Shop of Horrors
- Seymour Skinner, school principal in The Simpsons
- Seymour Utterthwaite, in Last of the Summer Wine, played by Michael Aldridge
- Seymour, lead character in the Seymour series of early 2D platform games by Codemasters
- Seymour (Futurama), Fry's dog in Futurama
- Seymour, the green fuzzy lead puppet in the 1970s children's television series Hot Fudge
- Seymour (Burn Notice), an eccentric arms dealer in the television series Burn Notice
- Seymour, a Muppet elephant who appeared on Muppets Tonight
- Seymour, in a series of 1990s video games by Codemasters, including Seymour Goes to Hollywood
- Seymour, portrayed by Larry Vincent, a television horror host
- Seymour, a leopard head in Rick Riordan's Camp Half-Blood Chronicles
- Ser Seymour, a knight NPC encountered in the RPG survival horror game Fear & Hunger

== See also ==
- Seymour (disambiguation)
- Seymour (surname)
- Seymore
