= Seymour-Conway =

Seymour-Conway is a surname. Notable people with the surname include:

- Alice Seymour-Conway, Viscountess Beauchamp (1749–1772)
- Francis Seymour-Conway (disambiguation), multiple people
- Lord George Seymour-Conway (1763–1848), British politician
- Henry Seymour Conway (1721–1795), British general and statesman, son of Francis Seymour-Conway, 1st Baron Conway
- Henry Seymour-Conway, later Lord Henry Seymour (politician) (1746–1830)
- Hugh Seymour-Conway, later Lord Hugh Seymour (1759–1801)
- Isabella Seymour-Conway (disambiguation), multiple people
- Maria Seymour-Conway, Marchioness of Hertford (1771–1856)
- Popham Seymour-Conway (1675–1699), Anglo-Irish landowner and Member of Parliament
- Richard Seymour-Conway, 4th Marquess of Hertford (1800–1870)
- Robert Seymour-Conway, later Lord Robert Seymour (1748–1831)

== See also ==
- Seymour (surname)
- Conway (surname)
