= Benger =

Benger may refer to:

== Places ==
- Benger, Western Australia
- Benger Swamp, Western Australia
- Sutton Benger, Wiltshire, England

== People ==
- Elizabeth Benger (1775–1827), English biographer, novelist and poet
- John Benger (born 1959), British official and Clerk of the House of Commons
- John Benger (politician) (died c. 1457), English politician
- Marcel Benger (born 1998), German association football player
- Richard Benger, 16th-century English canon law jurist and Vice-Chancellor of the University of Oxford
- Thomas Benger (c. 1520 – 1577), Master of the Revels under Queen Elizabeth I of England
- William Benger (1894–1917), British flying ace
