= William Baldwin (author) =

English author

William Baldwin (fl. 1547) was an English author, poet, printer and clergyman.

== Early life ==
When Baldwin was ordained in 1560, he gave his age as 33; which means he was born in 1526 or 1527. He gave his place of birth as London. When he printed his own Canticles of Salomon in 1549, he described himself as a servant of the printer Edward Whitchurch. He was probably apprenticed to Whitchurch, for it was the latter who printed Baldwin's Treatise of Moral Philosophy the previous year in 1547. That same year, Whitchurch also printed Christopher Langton's Principal Parts of Physic, to which Baldwin contributed a prefatory poem.

== Career ==
During the reigns of Edward VI and Queen Mary, it appears Baldwin played an occasional role in the production of theatrical exhibitions at court, while continuing to work at the printing shop. Records of the master of the revels, Thomas Cawarden, show that he had a hand in "a comedy concerning the way of life" and a morality play, but this cannot be confirmed.

Baldwin gave up printing in the early years of the reign of Elizabeth and turned to the church. He was ordained deacon by Edmund Grindal, Bishop of London, on 14 January 1560, and priest on 25 January. He was appointed rector of Folkington, Sussex, on 7 February 1561. He was also rector of St Michael Querne, London.

== Death ==
He died some time before 1 November 1563. A further possible identification is in Stowe's account in Historical Memoranda of one Baldwin preaching at Paul's Cross in September 1563, who died a week later of the plague.

== Works ==
Baldwin was a fairly prolific author. His works are listed here in order of the date of probably composition.

=== Sonnet for Langton's Principal Parts of Physic (1547) ===
Baldwin's first printed work was the sonnet he wrote advertising the qualities of Christopher Langton's Principal Parts of Physic. The book was printed on 10 April 1547 by Edward Whitchurch. It is the first English sonnet to see print.

=== A Treatise of Moral Philosophy (1548) ===
The 1547 A Treatise of Morall Phylosophie, contayning the Sayinges of the Wyse, authored by Baldwin and printed by Whitchurch, was a small black-letter octavo of 142 leaves. An enlarged edition of this work was later published by Thomas Paulfreyman, and continued to be popular for a century.

=== Canticles of Salomon (1549) ===
Baldwin's next project was a complicated English translation of the Song of Songs. He dedicated to king Edward VI, and notes the warm reception at court of Thomas Sternhold's Metrical Psalms. In the preface to the reader, Baldwin explains his method, which is to take the text verse by verse, in English translation, then add an “argument”, explaining what it means, which is followed by a lengthy paraphrase. Baldwin uses a wide variety of verse-forms in these paraphrases. Baldwin himself printed the Canticles in 1549, describing himself as the servant of Edward Whitchurch. It was the only book he printed under his own name.

=== Wonderful News (c. 1552) ===
William Baldwin may be safely identified as the “W. B. Londoner” who translated Pier Paolo Vergerio's Epistola de morte Pauli tertii (1549) as Wonderful News of the Death of Paul III. The initials and place are right, and the preface concludes with Baldwin's motto : “Love and Live”. It was printed by Thomas Gaultier around 1552.

=== Beware the Cat (1553) ===
Beware the Cat is generally regarded as Baldwin's masterpiece. It is formally a first-person narrative, and relates an event which took place on a night during the Christmas of 1552/53. Baldwin and others have been engaged on the production of entertainments for the court, and one of them, Gregory Streamer, is persuaded to relate how he made an ointment which enabled him to understand the speech of animals, and particularly cats. Marginal notes add a droll commentary to his “orations”. The text is dedicated to the courtier John Young, and one of the characters is George Ferrers, Baldwin's main collaborator in the writing of A Mirror for Magistrates. The text was not published until 1561, in an edition now lost. The one which now serves as the standard edition is in fact the second edition, published by Thomas Marsh in 1570. Gregory Streamer was a real person, and Baldwin's sly mockery of him called forth an anonymous ballad in defence of Streamer : A Short Answer to a Book Called Beware the Cat (1561).

=== The Funerals of King Edward VI (1553) ===
In the preface to The Funerals of King Edward VI, Baldwin says he wrote the text between the death of the king and his burial, i.e., between 6 July and 8 August 1553. He also says that he tried to have it published under Mary, but to no avail. The book was eventually published by Thomas Marsh in 1560.
It is a composite of three texts. The first, which has the same title as the book as a whole, relates how God punished the sinful English by taking away their king. The second is an “Exhortation to the Repentance of Sins and Amendment of Life”. The last is an epitaph : “The Death Plaint of Lofe Praise of King Edward VI”.

=== A Mirror for Magistrates (1554/1555) ===
William Baldwin was the compiler of one of the great monuments of mid-Tudor literature : A Mirror of Magistrates. It consists of a sequence of “tragedies”, in which its poets are presented as taking on the role of the fallen princes of England from the reign of Richard II to Henry VII, who have come back from the grave to tell their tales. The history of the genesis and production of this work is complex and obscure. But we know that Baldwin wrote a good deal of the early version, finished but suppressed by the end of 1555 at the latest. Some version of this text was finally published by Thomas Marsh in 1559, with a continuation in 1563.
Baldwin was responsible for the tragedies of Lord Mowbray (IV), Owen Glendower (VI), Richard, Earl of Cambridge (VIII), Richard, Duke of York (XIII), and George, Duke of Clarence (XVIII), and (in 1563) the tragedy of Anthony, Lord Rivers (XX). He also wrote all the proses sections connecting the tragedies.

== Apocryphal Works ==
William Baldwin has been proposed to be the author behind several works bearing the names, pseudonyms, or initials of other authors.

=== Poems by "Western Will" (c. 1552) ===
The English Short Title Catalogue has suggested that Baldwin as the author of two poems signed by "Western Will" and “William Waterman”, first printed in the early 1550s, and then reprinted in The Contention Betwixt Churchyard and Camell in 1560. But the author of these poems really is a man named William Waterman, author of Latin poems on the death of Henry and Charles Brandon, dukes of Suffolk, in 1551, and translator of a part of Boemus's Omnium gentium mores in 1555 or 1556, as The Fardle of Fashions.

=== "Oliver Oldwanton"'s Image of Idleness (1556) ===
R. W. Maslen has suggested that Baldwin might be the writer behind the pseudonym “Oliver Oldwanton”, supposed author of The Image of Idleness (1556).

=== G. B.'s Ship of Safeguard (1569) ===
A. H. Bullen thought he was probably the G. B. who wrote The Ship of Safeguard (1569). But we now know the author was Barnabe Googe.

== See also ==
- Parody
