= Roger Puleston =

Welsh politician

Sir Roger Puleston (1565 – 13 December 1618) was a Welsh politician who sat in the House of Commons at various times between 1584 and 1611.

Puleston was the son of Sir Roger Puleston of Emral. He matriculated at Brasenose College, Oxford, on 27 April 1582. In 1584, he was elected Member of Parliament for Great Bedwyn. He entered the Inner Temple in November 1585. In 1586, he was reelected MP for Great Bedwyn. He was elected MP for Flintshire in 1588 and MP for Denbighshire in 1593. In 1604, he was elected MP for Flintshire again. He was knighted on 28 August 1617.

Puleston died at the age of about 53.

Puleston married Jane Hanmer daughter of William Hanmer of Hanmer.

Parliament of England
Preceded by Simon Bowyer; George Ireland	Member of Parliament for Great Bedwyn; 1584–1587; With: Richard Wheler	Succeeded by John Seymour; Henry Ughtred
Preceded by William Ravenscroft	Member of Parliament for Flintshire; 1589	Succeeded by Thomas Hanmer
Preceded by John Edwards / William Almer	Member of Parliament for Denbighshire; 1593	Succeeded by John Lloyd
Preceded by William Ravenscroft	Member of Parliament for Flintshire; 1604–1611	Succeeded by Robert Ravenscroft
