= Edward Hungerford (died 1572) =

English politician

Edward Hungerford (c. 1519 – 1572) was an English politician who sat in the House of Commons in 1554.

== Biography ==
Hungerford was probably the son of Sir Anthony Hungerford of Down Ampney, Gloucestershire and his first wife Jane Darrell, daughter of Sir Edward Darrell of Littlecote, Wiltshire. He was a commissioner for relief for Berkshire in 1550. In 1554, he was elected Member of Parliament for Great Bedwyn.

Hungerford made his will on 13 September 1572 and an inventory of his estate was produced in November 1572. He asked to be buried in Welford church.

Hungerford made a marriage settlement in June 1555, at the time of his marriage to Dorothy Allen, daughter of Robert Allen of London. They had at least a son and five daughters. His brother John Hungerford was also MP for Great Bedwyn.

== Notes ==
Parliament of England
Preceded by Richard Fulmerston; Sir Edmund Rous	Member of Parliament for Great Bedwyn; 1554; With: Richard Fulmerston	Succeeded by Henry Clifford; David Seymour
