= Seemore =

Seemore may refer to:

- SEEMORE, a Croatian pay-per-view satellite platform
- SeeMore's Playhouse, an American children's series.

== See also ==
- "See No More"
- See-More
- Seymore (disambiguation)
- Seymour (disambiguation)
