= Francis Seymour-Conway =

Francis Seymour-Conway may refer to:

- Francis Seymour-Conway, 1st Baron Conway (1679–1732), Member of Parliament for Bramber
- Francis Seymour-Conway, 1st Marquess of Hertford (1718–1794), Lord Lieutenant of Ireland and Lord Chamberlain
- Francis Ingram-Seymour-Conway, 2nd Marquess of Hertford (1743–1822), Chief Secretary for Ireland and Lord Chamberlain
- Francis Seymour-Conway, 3rd Marquess of Hertford (1777–1842), Vice-Chamberlain of the Household

== See also ==
- Francis Seymour (disambiguation)
- Francis Conway (disambiguation)
