= John Combe =

John Combe may refer to:

- John Combe (fl. 1380–1390), English politician
- John Combe (1895–1967), British Army officer
- John Combe (fl. 1900–1902), American mayor, see List of mayors of St. Joseph, Missouri
