= Henry Clifford =

Henry Clifford may refer to:

- Henry Clifford, 1st Earl of Cumberland (1493–1542)
- Henry Clifford, 2nd Earl of Cumberland (1517–1570)
- Henry Clifford (died 1577), MP for Salisbury and Great Bedwyn
- Henry Clifford, 5th Earl of Cumberland (1591–1643)
- Henry Hugh Clifford (1826–1883), English recipient of the Victoria Cross
- Henry Clifford (British Army officer) (1867–1916), his son, killed in action during the Battle of the Somme
- Henry Clifford, 10th Baron Clifford, chief commander in the Battle of Flodden, 1513
  - Henry Clifford (opera) by Isaac Albéniz, about him
- Henry Clifford (legal writer) (1768–1813)
- Henry de Clifford, MP for Gloucestershire (UK Parliament constituency)
- Henry Clifford (field hockey) (born 1928), American Olympic hockey player

== See also ==
- Harry Edward Clifford (1852–1932), Trinidadian architect
