= Hungerford (disambiguation) =

Hungerford is a town in Berkshire, England.

Hungerford may also refer to:

== Places ==
=== Australia ===
- Hungerford, Queensland, an outback town in the Shire of Bulloo

=== Canada ===
- Hungerford, Ontario, a settlement in the municipality of Tweed, Hastings County, Ontario

=== United Kingdom ===
- Hungerford, Berkshire
  - Hungerford railway station
  - Hungerford Rural District, 1894 to 1974
- Hungerford, Waltham St Lawrence, a location in Berkshire
- Hungerford, Hampshire, a hamlet
- Hungerford, Shropshire, a location
- Hungerford, Somerset, a location
- Hungerford Newtown, a hamlet in Berkshire
- Farleigh Hungerford, Somerset, a village

=== United States ===
- Hungerford, Texas
- Hungerford Township, Plymouth County, Iowa

== People ==
- Hungerford (surname)
- Hungerford Crewe, 3rd Baron Crewe (1812–1894), English landowner and peer
- Hungerford Dunch (1639–1680), English MP for Cricklade
- Hungerford Hoskyns, several of the Hoskyns baronets
- Margaret Wolfe Hungerford, Irish novelist

== See also ==
- Hungerford Bridge, a bridge over the Thames at London
- Hungerford Market, a market at what is now Charing Cross Station, London
- Hungerford massacre, a mass shooting in 1987 at Hungerford, Berkshire
