= John Temple =

John Temple may refer to:

== Politics ==
- John Temple (MP for Ripon) (1518–1558), MP for Ripon 1554 and Great Bedwyn 1558
- John Temple (Irish politician) (1632–1705), Attorney General of Ireland
- John Temple (diplomat) (1731–1798), 8th Baronet, first British consul-general to the United States
- Henry John Temple, 3rd Viscount Palmerston (1784–1865), British Liberal Party Prime Minister
- John Temple (Conservative politician) (1910–1994), British Conservative Party Member of Parliament
- John Temple (Florida politician) (born 1976), member of the Florida House of Representatives

== Other ==
- John Temple (judge) (1600–1677), Master of the Rolls in Ireland
- Jonathan Temple (1796–1866), Los Angeles pioneer
- John Temple was lynched by a white mob on September 30, 1919, in Alabama.
- Johnny Temple (musician) (1906–1968), blues musician
- Johnny Temple (1927–1994), baseball player
- John Temple (coach), American college baseball coach
- John Temple (surgeon), British surgeon
- Johnny Temple (bassist), American bassist
