= William Plomer (disambiguation) =

William Plomer was a writer.

William Plomer may also refer to:

- William Plomer (MP for Great Bedwyn), English politician
- William Plomer (MP for Cricklade), see Cricklade (UK Parliament constituency)
