= George Seymour =

George Seymour may refer to:

- George Seymour (Australian politician), mayor of the Fraser Coast, Queensland, Australia
- George Seymour (cricketer), English cricketer
- George Seymour (Royal Navy officer) (1787–1870), British admiral
- George Hamilton Seymour (1797–1880), British diplomat, son of Lord George Seymour
- George Seymour, 7th Marquess of Hertford (1871–1940)
- George Dudley Seymour (1859–1945), American historian, patent attorney and city planner
- George FitzRoy Seymour (1923–1994), High Sheriff of Nottinghamshire in 1966
- George Franklin Seymour (1829–1906), bishop of Springfield in the Episcopal Church
- George Henry Seymour, 1818–1869 (Henry Seymour (Royal Navy officer)), MP for Antrim
- George Stanley Seymour, 1895–1978 (Stan Seymour), English football player and manager
- George Steele Seymour, (1878–1945) American author
- Lord George Seymour (1763–1848), British politician

== See also ==
- Sir George Seymour (1844 ship), English migrant ship
