= Mark Milliner =

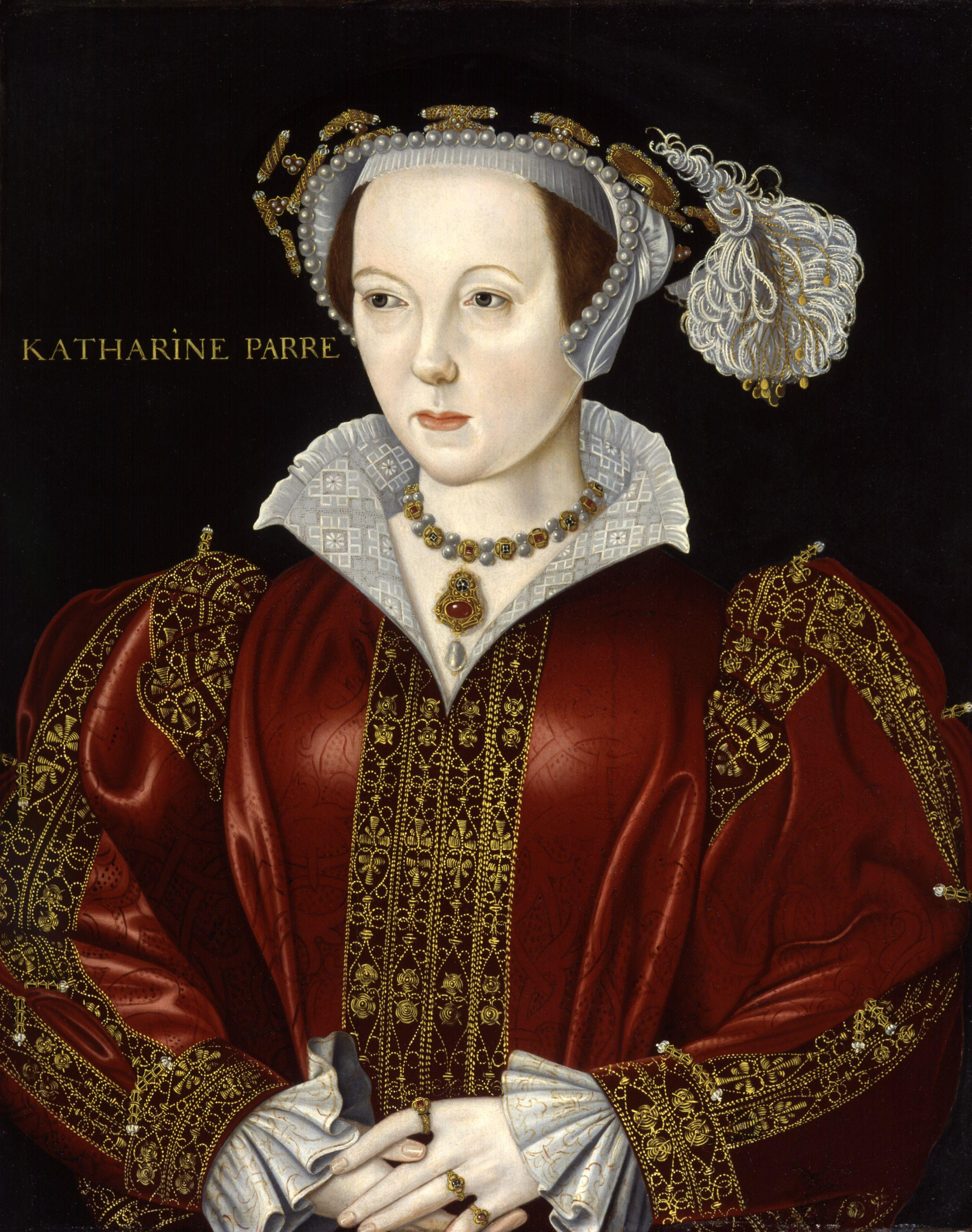
Mark Milliner made hats for Catherine Parr

Mark Milliner was a wardrobe servant and supplier at the court of Henry VIII, a costume maker, and a milliner to Catherine Parr. His trade as a milliner took the place of a surname in records.

Mark Milliner sold silk ribbon for aglet clothing fasteners, points, black velvet and black sarsenet, Spanish and English gloves, and hats to Catherine Parr. A felt hat was covered with satin and trimmed with gold lace, and a cap of red and yellow velvet had four feathers and four gold tassels. He provided gloves for hawking and hawking bags to Henry VIII.

The range of goods supplied is similar to that of another milliner at Henry's court, Christopher Carcano, and it is possible that both Mark and Christopher were foreign artisans, possibly Italians from Milan. "Christopher Milliner" was included in the roll of New Year's Day gifts for 1540, receiving a silver gilt "cruse" or covered cup provided by the goldsmith Cornelis Hayes.

In 1545, the master of the revels, Thomas Cawarden acquired a book of Hans Holbein's patterns from Mark Milliner, described as "a booke of patrons of Hans Hollis" or "Holbyis". At the same time, Mark Milliner supplied striped cloth, feathers, visards, and women's gloves for the costumes of a masque at court. He signed one copy of Cawarden's bill in the margin as "Mark".

Cawarden elsewhere recorded the purchase of a "peynted book" of Hans Holbein's making for £6, and this second reference is sometimes associated with the series of portrait drawings in the Royal Collection. In the revels accounts a "patron" is a pattern or outfit, while a 1548 royal inventory listing of a "booke of paternes for phiosioneamys" may perhaps refer to a collection of portrait drawings.

"Marke mylyner" appears in the accounts of the revels for Edward VI, supplying costumes with "hedpieces for women with flax and here" and a white satin night cap for a masque. Flax was regularly used to make wigs and beards for stage costume in the 16th century.
