= John Hungerford =

John Hungerford may refer to:

- John Hungerford (by 1516 – 1582) of Stokke and Down Ampney, English MP for Great Bedwyn
- John Hungerford (died 1635) of Down Ampney, English MP for Gloucestershire, 1597 and Cricklade, 1604 and 1611
- John Hungerford (c. 1560 – 1636) of Cadnam, English MP for Wootton Bassett and Chippenham
- John Hungerford (congressman) (1761–1833), politician and lawyer from Virginia.
- John Hungerford (died 1729), lawyer and English MP for Scarborough
- John N. Hungerford (1825–1883), U.S. Representative from New York
