= James Seymour =

James or Jim Seymour may refer to:

- James Seymour (artist) (1702–1752), English artist
- James Seymour (Iowa politician) (born 1939), Iowa state senator
- James Seymour (Kent cricketer) (1879–1930), English cricketer
- James Seymour (Australian cricketer), Australian cricketer
- Jim Seymour (American football) (1946–2011), American football player
- Jim Seymour (hurdler) (born 1949), American hurdler
- James Seymour (Michigan politician) (1791–1864), Michigan politician
- James Benjamin Seymour (1867–1950), philatelist
- James M. Seymour (1837–1905), mayor of Newark, New Jersey
