= Edward Hungerford =

Edward Hungerford may refer to:

- Edward Hungerford (died 1572) (1519–1572), English MP for Great Bedwyn
- Sir Edward Hungerford (died 1522), English soldier, courtier, and a sheriff for Wiltshire, Somerset and Dorset
- Edward Hungerford (died 1607), English MP for Wiltshire
- Sir Edward Hungerford (died 1648) (1596–1648), supported Parliament during the English Civil War
- Sir Edward Hungerford (spendthrift) (1632–1711), member of Parliament and founder of Hungerford Market, Charing Cross
- Edward Hungerford (author) (1875–1948), American writer
- J. Edward Hungerford (1883–1964), American silent film screenwriter
