= Seymour =

Seymour may refer to:

== Places ==
=== Australia ===
- Seymour, Victoria, a township
  - Seymour railway station
- Electoral district of Seymour, a former electoral district in Victoria
- Rural City of Seymour, a former local government area in Victoria
- Seymour, Tasmania, a locality

=== Canada ===
- Seymour Range, a mountain range in British Columbia
- Mount Seymour, British Columbia
- Seymour River (Burrard Inlet), British Columbia
- Seymour River (Shuswap Lake), British Columbia
- Seymour Inlet, British Columbia
- Seymour Narrows, British Columbia
- Seymour Island (Nunavut)
- Seymour Township, Ontario

=== United States ===
- Seymour, Connecticut, a town
- Seymour, Illinois, a census-designated place
- Seymour, Indiana, a city
- Seymour, Iowa, a city
- Seymour, Missouri, a city
- Seymour, Tennessee, an unincorporated community and census-designated place
- Seymour, Texas, a city
- Seymour, Wisconsin (disambiguation)
- Seymour Perkins, Cutiepie

=== Elsewhere ===
- Kingston Seymour, a village in Somerset, England
- Seymour Island, off the tip of Graham Land on the Antarctic Peninsula
- Seymour, Eastern Cape, South Africa, a town

== People and fictional characters ==
- Seymour (given name), a list of people and fictional characters
- Seymour (surname), a list of people

== Other uses ==
- HMS Seymour, more than one ship of the British Royal Navy
- Seymour baronets, two titles in the Baronetage of England and one in the Baronetage of the United Kingdom
- Seymour Airport, Galápagos Islands, Ecuador
- Seymour College, a day and boarding school in Glen Osmond, South Australia
- Seymour Football Club, Victoria, Australia
- Seymour, the original title of the band Blur

== See also ==
- Seemore (disambiguation)
- Seymore
