= Thomas Hungerford =

Thomas Hungerford may refer to:

- Sir Thomas Hungerford (Speaker) (died 1398), first person recorded as holding the (pre-existing) office of Speaker of the House of Commons
- Sir Thomas Hungerford of Rowden (died 1469), eldest son of Robert Hungerford, 3rd Baron Hungerford
- Thomas Hungerford (died 1582), MP for Heytesbury (UK Parliament constituency)
- Thomas Hungerford (died 1595), MP for Great Bedwyn (UK Parliament constituency)
- Thomas Hungerford (Australian politician) (1823–1904), Australian pastoralist and politician
- Thomas W. Hungerford (1939–2014), American mathematician

== See also ==
- Tom Hungerford (1915–2014), popularly known as T. A. G. Hungerford, Australian writer
