= William Bailiff =

English politician

William Bailiff (fl. 1386) was an English politician.

He was a member (MP) of the parliament of England for Great Bedwyn in 1386. Nothing more is known of him.
