= William Newdigate =

16th-century English politician

William Newdigate (1495 – 1530/31) was the member of the Parliament of England for Great Bedwyn for the parliament of 1529.
