= Geoffrey Mauncell =

Member of the Parliament of England

Geoffrey Mauncell (fl. 1399) of Salisbury, Wiltshire, was an English goldsmith and politician.

He was a member (MP) of the parliament of England for Great Bedwyn in 1399.
