= George Hidden =

16th-century English politician

George Hidden (c.1527 – 1581 or later), also known as George Eden, was the member of the Parliament of England for Great Bedwyn for the parliament of 1558.
