= Thomas Smith (MP for Great Bedwyn) =

English politician

Thomas Smith (fl. 1382–1399), of Great Bedwyn, Wiltshire, was an English politician.

He was a smith and a member (MP) of the parliament of England for Great Bedwyn in May 1382, October 1382, February 1383, October 1383, April 1384, 1385 and 1399.
