= John Hungerford (by 1516 – 1582) =

English politician

John Hungerford (by 1516 – 1582) of Stokke Manor, Great Bedwyn, Wiltshire and Down Ampney, Gloucestershire was an English Member of Parliament.

He was born the eldest son of Sir Anthony Hungerford of Down Ampney and studied at the Inner Temple in 1534. He was the brother of Edward Hungerford (died 1572).

He was elected the member of the Parliament of England for Great Bedwyn for the Parliament of October 1553. He served as a Justice of the Peace for Gloucestershire and Wiltshire and was pricked High Sheriff of Gloucestershire for 1567–58. He succeeded his father in 1558 and was knighted in 1574.

He married firstly by 1541, Bridget, the daughter of John Fettiplace of East Shefford, Berkshire, with whom he had at least 1 son and secondly in 1563, Eleanor, the daughter of Walter, Lord Hungerford of Heytesbury and widow of William Master(s). They had at least 2 sons and 4 daughters. He was succeeded by his son Anthony.
