= Giles Hungerford =

English lawyer and politician

Sir Giles Hungerford (25 September 1614 – 7 March 1685) of Coulston, Wiltshire was an English lawyer and politician who sat in the House of Commons between 1660 and 1685.

Hungerford was the son of Anthony Hungerford of Black Bourton, Oxfordshire. He subscribed at Oxford University on 11 November 1631 and was called to the bar at Middle Temple in 1641. He was the brother of Anthony and half brother of Edward who were on opposite sides during the English Civil War.

In 1660, Hungerford was elected Member of Parliament for Whitchurch in the Convention Parliament. He was re-elected MP for Whitchurch in 1661 for the Cavalier Parliament and sat until 1679. He was knighted on 27 November 1676. In 1679 he was elected MP for Devizes but was so rigorously challenged by his opponents that he never took his seat.

Hungerford died at the age of 70 and has a memorial in Salisbury cathedral. He married twice: firstly in 1654 Frances, the daughter of Sir George Croke of Waterstock, Oxfordshire, coheiress to her brother Thomas and widow of Richard Jervoise of Freefolk; and secondly by 1673 Margaret, the daughter of Sir Thomas Hampson, 1st Baronet of Taplow, Buckinghamshire. His only child, his daughter Margaret (by his second wife), to whom he left his estates, married Robert Sutton, 2nd Baron Lexinton in 1691.
