= Stephen Hales (died 1574) =

English politician

Stephen Hales (died 1574) was an English politician.

He was a member (MP) of the parliament of England for Great Bedwyn in 1563 and Leicester in 1571.
