= Levinus Munck =

Member of the Parliament of England

Levinus Munck (died 1623) was the member of the Parliament of England for Great Bedwyn for the parliament of 1601.
