= St Andrew's Castle, Hamble =

Artillery fort constructed by Henry VIII

St Andrew's Castle
- Hamble-le-Rice, Hampshire
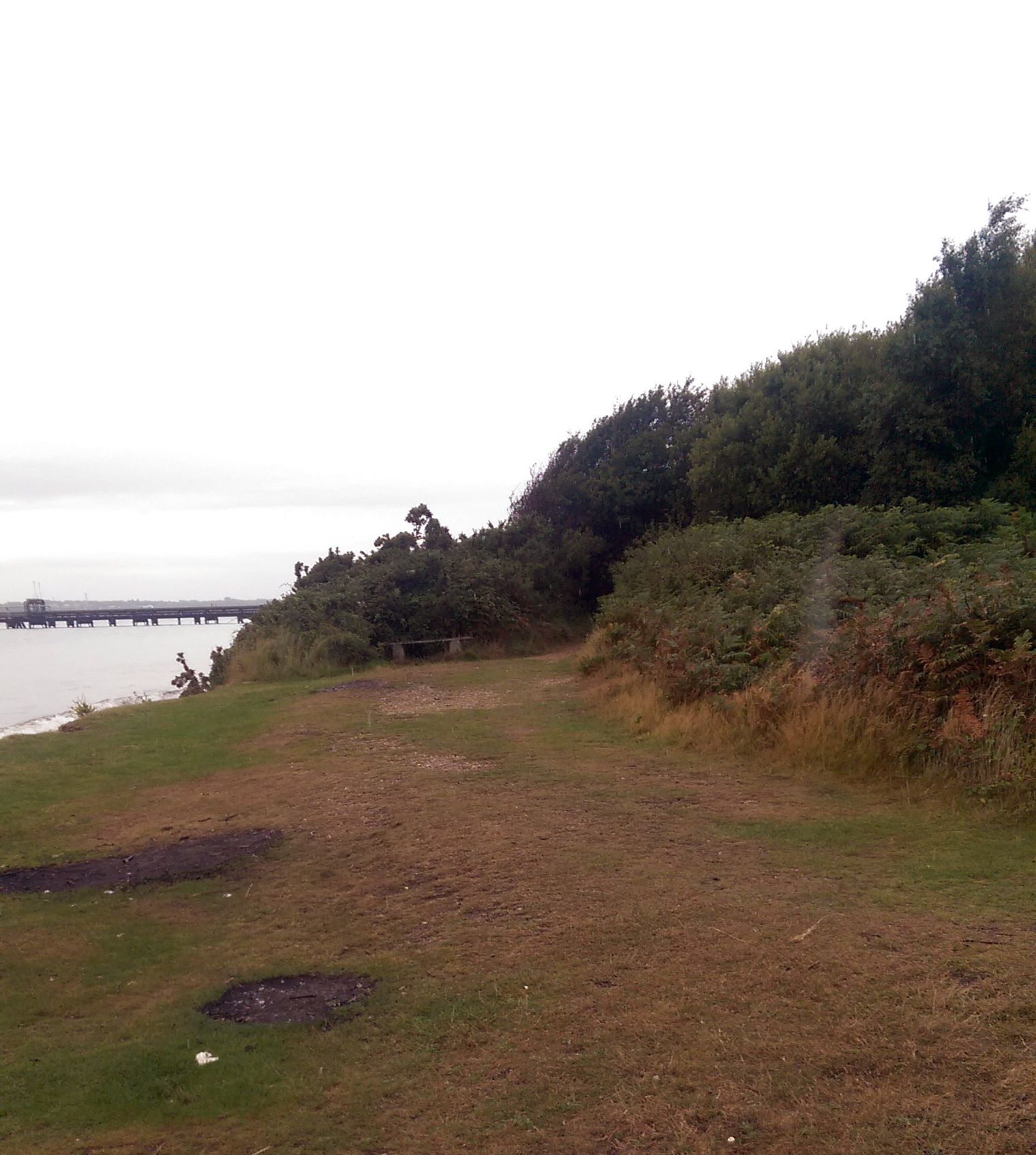
- The remains of the castle at high tide

Site information
- Type: Device Fort
- Open to the public: Yes
- Condition: Fragments only remain

Location
- Coordinates: 50.8524°N 1.3166°W
- Grid reference: grid reference SU482061

Site history
- Built: 1542-43
- Materials: Stone
- Events: English Civil War

St Andrew's Castle was an artillery fort constructed by Henry VIII near Hamble-le-Rice, Hampshire, between 1542 and 1543. It formed part of the King's Device programme to protect against invasion from France and the Holy Roman Empire, and defended Southampton Water near the Solent. St Andrew's comprised a keep and a gun platform, protected by a moat. The castle was decommissioned in 1642 during the English Civil War and has been largely destroyed through coastal erosion.

== History ==
St Andrew's Castle was built as a consequence of international tensions between England, France and the Holy Roman Empire in the final years of the reign of King Henry VIII. Traditionally the Crown had left coastal defences to the local lords and communities, only taking a modest role in building and maintaining fortifications, and while France and the Empire remained in conflict with one another, maritime raids were common but an actual invasion of England seemed unlikely. Basic defences, based around simple blockhouses and towers existed in the south-west and along the Sussex coast, with a few more impressive works in the north of England, but in general the fortifications were very limited in scale.

In 1533, Henry then broke with Pope Paul III in order to annul the long-standing marriage to his wife, Catherine of Aragon and remarry. Catherine was the aunt of Charles V, the Holy Roman Emperor, and he took the annulment as a personal insult. This resulted in France and the Empire declaring an alliance against Henry in 1538, and the Pope encouraging the two countries to attack England. An invasion of England appeared certain. In response, Henry issued an order, called a "device", in 1539, giving instructions for the "defence of the realm in time of invasion" and the construction of forts along the English coastline.

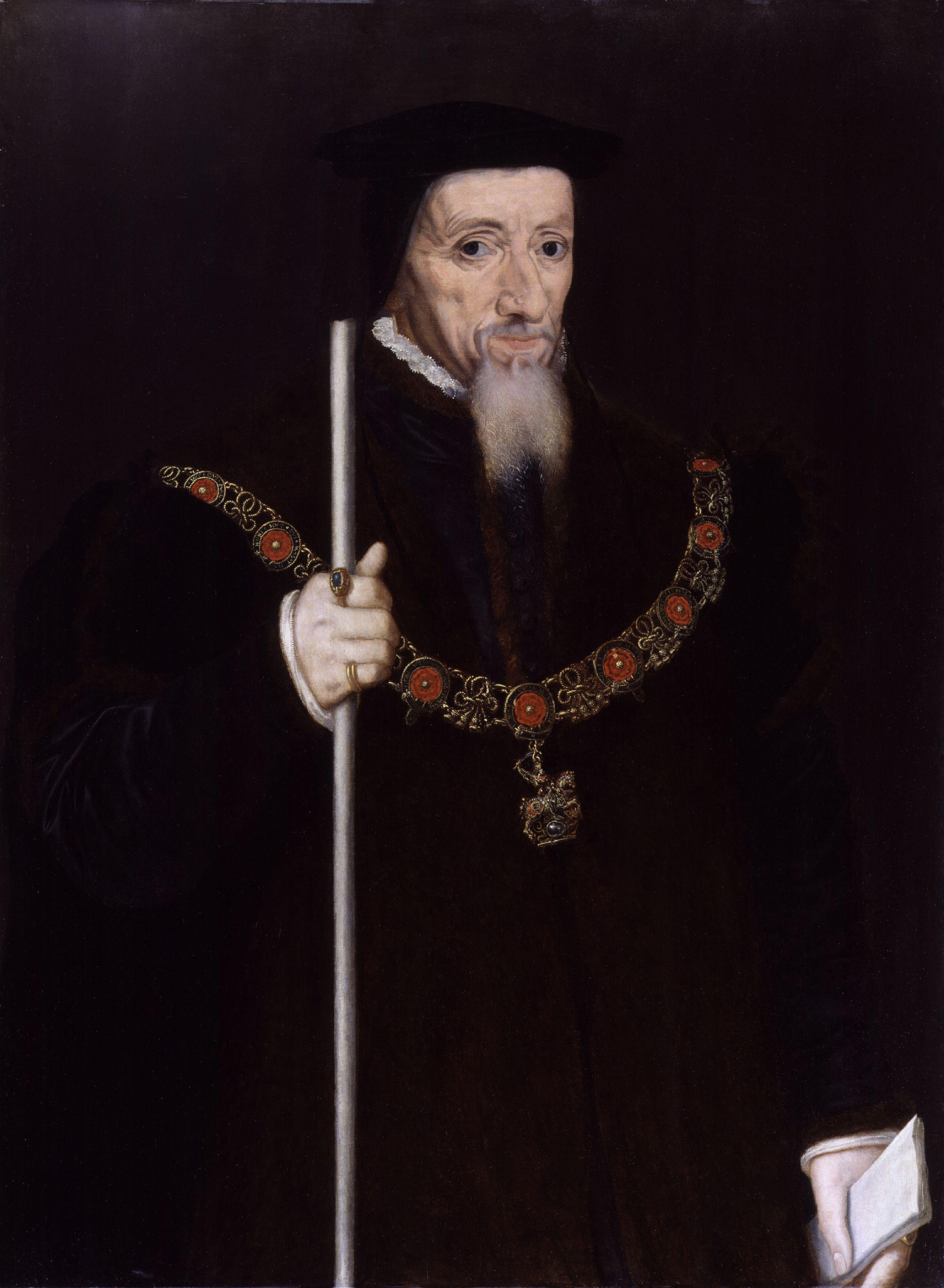
William Paulet, an early captain of the castle

St Andrew's Castle was built to defend Southampton Water, a body of water which linked the Solent to the important port of Southampton. It was positioned by the shore, on what is now Hamble Common, to the south of the village of Hamble-le-Rice. It was located at one end of an old Iron Age ditch—the area had previously been occupied during this period, when a promontory hillfort, Hamble Common Camp, was built just along the coast. Construction took place between 1542 and 1543, but the fortification may not have been fully completed until after Henry's death in 1547.

The castle comprised a tall, square keep made from stone, with a semi-circular gun platform on the seaward side, protected by a 25-metre-wide (82 ft) moat and a wooden breakwater; it would have been similar in design to the contemporary fortification of West Cowes Castle. A survey in 1559 reported that the castle was heavily armed, with its artillery comprising two iron culverins, an iron demi-culverin, two iron sakers, two bases, an iron falcon, an iron falconet and a quarter sling. The lighter guns would probably have been placed on the roof of the keep, with two heavy weapons lower down and the remainder on the external gun platform. It also held handguns, bows and hand weapons for close defence.

William Paulet, later the Marquess of Winchester, was appointed as Keeper and Captain of the castle in 1547, being paid £19 each year to perform the role; his garrison included a master gunner, a porter and six soldiers. (Note: Comparing early modern costs and prices with those of the modern period is challenging. £19 in 1547 could be equivalent to between £9,900 and £4 million in 2014, depending on the price comparison used. For comparison, the total royal expenditure on all the Device Forts across England between 1539–47 came to £376,500, with St Mawes, for example, costing £5,018, and Sandgate £5,584.) Paulet also controlled Netley Castle, just along the coast.

By 1559 the garrison had decreased slightly, comprising a captain, two gunners and four soldiers. Simon Bowyer, a gentleman usher at the Elizabethan court, was appointed keeper of the castle in 1577. He was instructed to employ a porter, a master gunner, and six soldiers or gunners.

The castle was still operational in 1623, but it was decommissioned by Parliamentary forces in 1642 during the English Civil War. The site has been heavily affected by coastal erosion—the local shoreline was retreating by 0.5 metres (1 ft 8 in) a year during the 1990s—and only a few parts of the masonry and earthworks can still be seen in the 21st century. The remains of the castle and the surrounding common land are protected under UK law as a scheduled monument.

== See also ==
- Castles in Great Britain and Ireland
- List of castles in England

== Bibliography ==
- Biddle, Martin; Hiller, Jonathon; Scott, Ian; Streeten, Anthony (2001). Henry VIII's Coastal Artillery Fort at Camber Castle, Rye, East Sussex: An Archaeological Structural and Historical Investigation. Oxford, UK: Oxbow Books. ISBN 0904220230.
- Kenyon, J. R. (1979). "An Aspect of the 1559 Survey of the Isle of Wight: The State of all the Quenes maties Fortresses and Castelles". Post-Medieval Archaeology. 13: 61–77. doi:10.1179/pma.1979.002. ISSN 0079-4236.
- King, D. J. Cathcart (1991). The Castle in England and Wales: An Interpretative History. London, UK: Routledge Press. ISBN 9780415003506.
- Hale, John R. (1983). Renaissance War Studies. London, UK: Hambledon Press. ISBN 0907628176.
- Harrington, Peter (2007). The Castles of Henry VIII. Oxford, UK: Osprey Publishing. ISBN 9781472803801.
- Morley, B. M. (1976). Henry VIII and the Development of Coastal Defence. London, UK: Her Majesty's Stationery Office. ISBN 0116707771.
- Scard, Margaret (2014). Tudor Survivor: The Life and Times of Courtier William Paulet. Stroud, UK: The History Press. ISBN 9780752469256.
- Spurgeon, J. P. G.; Brooke, J. (1996). "Use of the Contingent Evaluation Method to Quantify Some Aspects of the Environmental Effects of Coastal Defence Schemes". In Fleming, C. A. (ed.). Topographical Writers in South-West England. London, UK: Thomas Telford Publishing. pp. 118–131. ISBN 9780859894241.
- Saunders, Andrew (1989). Fortress Britain: Artillery Fortifications in the British Isles and Ireland. Liphook, UK: Beaufort. ISBN 1855120003.
- Thompson, M. W. (1987). The Decline of the Castle. Cambridge, UK: Cambridge University Press. ISBN 1854226088.
- Walton, Steven A. (2010). "State Building Through Building for the State: Foreign and Domestic Expertise in Tudor Fortification". Osiris. 25 (1): 66–84. doi:10.1086/657263. ISSN 0369-7827. S2CID 144384757.
