= Senator Seymour =

Senator Seymour may refer to:

== Members of the United States Senate ==
- Horatio Seymour (Vermont politician) (1778–1857), U.S. Senator from Vermont from 1821 to 1833
- John Seymour (California politician) (born 1937), U.S. Senator from California from 1991 to 1992

== United States state senate members ==
- Edward Woodruff Seymour (1832–1892), Connecticut State Senate
- Edward Seymour (Vermont politician) (1810–1883), Vermont State Senate
- Henry W. Seymour (1834–1906), Michigan State Senate
- Henry Seymour (New York politician) (1780–1837), New York State Senate
- James Seymour (Iowa politician) (born 1939), Iowa State Senate
- James Seymour (Michigan politician) (1791–1864), Michigan State Senate
- Morris Woodruff Seymour (1843–1920), Connecticut State Senate
- Whitney North Seymour Jr. (1923–2019), New York State Senate
