= Walter Halliday =

English royal minstrel

Walter Halliday (also spelled Halladay, Haliday, Halyday, and Holliday) was a long-serving royal minstrel in England in the 15th century. He was a founder member of a minstrels' guild which was the forerunner of the present Worshipful Company of Musicians. He is believed to be the founding father of the Halliday family of Gloucestershire, and an ancestor of some of the Halliday/ Holladay/ Holliday/ Hollyday families in the United States.

== Family ==
Surviving records show that Walter was a minstrel in the service of three successive kings, for at least fifty-four years, between 1415. and 1469. This suggests that he was born not later than 1400.

According to Burke's Genealogical and Heraldic History of the Commoners of England (1836), Walter was a younger son of the chieftain of Annandale in Dumfries in Scotland. However, Burke does not cite the source of this information and, as the Bluemantle Pursuivant at the College of Arms stated in 1975, this book "is compiled from family traditions, not proved, and is not accepted as an authority; there are many errors in it".

The records show that, in addition to Walter, two other Hallidays were royal minstrels in the first half of the 15th century : William and Thomas. As William appears to have been older than the other two, it's possible that Walter and Thomas were brothers and William was their father. The recurrence of surnames in the lists of royal minstrels over the years strongly suggests "that minstrelsy could be a family business".

== Royal minstrel ==
Walter's first recorded listing as a royal minstrel is at the battle of Agincourt in 1415. He, and William and Thomas, are listed among the minstrels in King Henry V's retinue. Thereafter, his name appears in the royal financial records on many occasions between 1421 and 1467, particularly in connection with payments of livery (clothing) allowances.

In 1423, King Henry VI authorised a regular payment to the minstrels. In 1439, Henry VI granted Walter and other minstrels an annual payment, on condition that they did not work for anyone else.

In the late 1440s, the royal court became aware that "many rude husbandmen and artificers" were posing as royal minstrels and charging money for their amateur performances. This defrauded the public, and cheated the real minstrels of income. In 1449, Henry VI therefore authorised William Langton (marshal of the minstrels), Walter Halliday, and five other royal minstrels to investigate these activities and to punish the impostors.

In 1456, Walter and three other minstrels were commissioned to recruit "suitable boys, instructed in the art of minstrelsy", to take the place of some royal minstrels who had died.

Henry VI's reign ended in 1461, when his cousin, Edward of York, deposed him and seized the throne as King Edward IV. This does not appear to have affected the minstrels, as they retained their positions under the new king. By 1464, Walter had succeeded Langton as Marshal of the Minstrels and was now in charge of all the minstrels. By then, he had been a minstrel for around fifty years. It is on record that, when Edward IV married Elizabeth Woodville in 1464, Walter conducted an orchestra of 100 players.

A few years later, it appears that the minstrels were reorganised under two marshals, one for the 'haut' instruments, i.e. trumpets, horns, nakers, tabors, bagpipes, and shawms, and one for the 'bas' instruments, i.e. organs, flutes, crumhorns and stringed instruments. Walter was marshal of the 'bas' minstrels, which suggests that he himself played one or more of those instruments.

Walter last appears on record in 1469, when the problem of bogus minstrels defrauding the public and cheating the official minstrels out of income, was dealt with again. In 1469, Edward IV granted a royal charter authorising "Walter Haliday (marshal), John Cliff, Robert Marshall, Thomas Grene, Thomas Calthorn, William Cliff, William Christean, and William Eynsham our minstrels" to found a brotherhood or guild of minstrels. It was to be headed by a marshal, appointed for life and two wardens elected annually. No minstrel, no matter how skilled, was to be allowed to perform in public unless he was a member of the guild, and the guild had the power to fine offenders. This guild is regarded as a forerunner of the Worshipful Company of Musicians.

For how much longer Walter served as Marshal of the Minstrels is unknown. He is believed to have retired to Rodborough in Gloucestershire and owned property there.

== Supposed knighthood and coat of arms ==
A story arose in the United States of America, in the twentieth century that, in addition to being Master of the Revels, Walter Halliday had been knighted, had fought alongside Edward IV in the Battle of Tewkesbury, and had been granted a coat of arms "for his valor" in the battle. The arms attributed to "Sir" Walter are those listed in Burke's Commoners : Sable, three helmets Argent garnished Or within a bordure engrailed Argent. Crest : A demi-lion rampant Or supporting an anchor Azure. Motto : 'Quarta Saluti'.

This story does not stand up well under scrutiny. Walter would have been around seventy years old at the time of the battle of Tewkesbury in 1471, and rather old to be taking up the sword instead of his accustomed musical instrument. He is not listed among the knights created by Edward IV before or after the battle. Bluemantle Pursuivant reported in 1975 that "I find no trace of Sir Walter in the official records of the College of Arms", and that "the arms in Burke's Commoners are wrong".

The coat of arms supposedly granted to Walter is actually that which was confirmed to his descendant Sir Leonard Holliday, lord mayor of London, in 1605, and the crest was granted to Sir Leonard at the same time. A possible explanation for the attribution of these arms to Walter is that, because Burke's Commoners states (without citing a source) that they were granted in the time of Edward IV, it has been assumed that Walter, his "master of the revels" (sic), was the grantee. Burke is incorrect as to the date of the arms, as they are known to have existed long before the reign of Edward IV, and before kings of arms began formally granting arms.

== See also ==
- Sir Leonard Holliday
- William Holliday
