= Francis Conway =

Francis Conway may refer to:

- Francis Seymour-Conway, 1st Baron Conway (1679–1732), Member of Parliament for Bramber
- Francis Seymour-Conway, 1st Marquess of Hertford (1718–1794), Lord Lieutenant of Ireland and Lord Chamberlain
- Francis Ingram-Seymour-Conway, 2nd Marquess of Hertford (1743–1822), Chief Secretary for Ireland and Lord Chamberlain
- Francis Seymour-Conway, 3rd Marquess of Hertford (1777–1842), Vice-Chamberlain of the Household
- Francis Conway, plantation owner for whom Port Conway, Virginia was named

== See also ==
- Conway Francis (1870–1924), English cricketer
