= Maurice Hommedieux =

15th-century English politician

Maurice Hommedieux was the member of the Parliament of England for Great Bedwyn for the parliament of December 1421.
