= Robert Pagman =

16th-century English politician

Robert Pagman (by 1497 – 1552) was the member of the Parliament of England for Great Bedwyn for the parliament of 1547.
