= David Seymour (disambiguation) =

David Seymour (born 1983) is a New Zealand politician and leader of the ACT Party

David Seymour may also refer to:

- David Seymour (English politician) (died 1557/58), 16th-century Member of Parliament (MP) for Wareham and Great Bedwyn
- David Seymour (photographer) (1911–1956), a photographer and photojournalist
- David Seymour (rugby union) (born 1984), English rugby union player
- David L. Seymour (1803–1867), U.S. Representative from New York
- David Thompson Seymour (1831–1916), Irish soldier and police commissioner
