= John Benger (politician) =

English politician

John Benger (died c. 1457), of Pewsey, Wiltshire, was an English politician.

He was a member (MP) of the parliament of England for Great Bedwyn in 1420.
