= Judge Seymour =

Judge Seymour may refer to:

- Augustus Sherrill Seymour (1836–1897), judge of the United States District Court for the Eastern District of North Carolina
- Margaret B. Seymour (born 1947), judge of the United States District Court for the District of South Carolina
- Stephanie Kulp Seymour (born 1940), judge of the United States Court of Appeals for the Tenth Circuit

== See also ==
- Justice Seymour (disambiguation)
