= General Seymour =

General Seymour may refer to:

- Algernon Seymour, 7th Duke of Somerset (1684–1750), British Army general
- Edward Seymour, 1st Duke of Somerset (1500–1552), English lieutenant general of the north
- Francis Seymour, 5th Marquess of Hertford (1812–1884), British Army general
- Sir Francis Seymour, 1st Baronet (1813–1890), British Army general
- Truman Seymour (1824–1891), Union Army major general
- William Seymour (British Army officer, born 1664) (1664–1728), British Army lieutenant general
- Lord William Seymour (British Army officer) (1838–1915), British Army general
- William Henry Seymour (1829–1921), British Army general
