= Charles Seymour (disambiguation) =

Charles Seymour (1885–1963) was an American academic, historian and President of Yale University.

Charles Seymour may also refer to:

- Charles Seymour, 2nd Baron Seymour of Trowbridge (1621–1665)
- Charles Seymour, 6th Duke of Somerset (1662–1748)
- Charles Seymour (cricketer) (1855–1934), English cricketer
- Charles Gurney Seymour, a fictional character in the political novel First Among Equals, by Jeffrey Archer
