= Brett Hungerford =

Australian rules footballer

Personal information
- Full name: Brett Hungerford
- Born: 2 April 1969 (age 57)
- Original teams: Tooleybuc, (Mid Murray)

Playing career^{1}
Years	Club	Games (Goals)
1990	Geelong	2 (0)
- ^{1} Playing statistics correct to the end of 1990.

Brett Hungerford (born 2 April 1969) is a former Australian rules footballer who played for Geelong in the Australian Football League (AFL) in 1990. He was recruited from the Tooleybuc Football Club in the Mid Murray Football League.
