= Robert Hungerford =

Robert Hungerford may refer to:

- Robert Hungerford, 2nd Baron Hungerford (1409–1459), the second but eldest surviving son of Walter, Lord Hungerford
- Robert Hungerford, 3rd Baron Hungerford (1431–1464)
- Robert Hungerford (MP for Calne), in 1553, MP for Calne (UK Parliament constituency)
