= Michael Seymour =

Michael Seymour may refer to:

- Sir Michael Seymour, 1st Baronet (1768–1834), British naval commander
- Michael Seymour (Royal Navy officer, born 1802) (1802–1887), British naval commander, son of the above
- Michael Seymour (production designer) (1932–2018), production designer
- Michael Seymour (cricketer), South African cricketer commonly known as Kelly
- Michael Hobart Seymour (1800–1874), Anglo-Irish Protestant clergyman and religious controversialist

== See also ==
- Sir Michael Culme-Seymour, 3rd Baronet (1836–1920), Royal Navy officer
- Sir Michael Culme-Seymour, 4th Baronet (1867–1925), Royal Navy officer
