= Elizabeth Seymour =

Elizabeth Seymour may refer to:

- Elizabeth Seymour, Lady Cromwell (c. 1518–1568), sister of Queen Jane, the third wife of Henry VIII of England
- Elizabeth Seymour, Duchess of Somerset (1667–1722), Whig politician
- Elizabeth Percy, Duchess of Northumberland (1716–1776), née Seymour
