= John Combe (MP) =

English politician

John Combe of Great Bedwyn, Wiltshire, was an English politician.

He was a member (MP) of the parliament of England for Great Bedwyn in January 1380, February 1383, November 1384, 1386 and January 1390.
