= Great Bedwyn (constituency) =

Parliamentary constituency in the United Kingdom, 1801–1832

- Former borough constituency for the House of Commons

1295–1832
- Seats: Two

Great Bedwyn was a parliamentary borough in Wiltshire, centred on Great Bedwyn, which elected two Members of Parliament (MPs) to the House of Commons from 1295 until 1832, when the borough was abolished by the Great Reform Act.

== Members of Parliament ==
=== 1295–1640 ===
Parliament	First member	Second member
1295	Sir William Russell (d.1311), Lord of Yaverland	
1386	John Combe	William Bailiff
1388 (Feb)		
1388 (Sep)		
1390 (Jan)	John Combe	William Plomer
1399	Thomas Smith	Geoffrey Mauncell
1420	John Benger	John Everard
1421 (May)
1421 (Dec)	Thomas Hussey	Maurice Hommedieux
1449	Sir Thomas Malory	
1491	William Paston	
1510–1523	No names known	
1529	William Newdigate died and replaced 1532/3 by? Thomas Polsted	John Berwick
1536	?	
1539	?	
1542	?	
1545	John Winchcombe alias Smallwood	John Seymour
1547	Anthony Browne	Robert Pagman
1553 (Mar)	?	
1553 (Oct)	Richard Fulmerston	John Hungerford
1554 (Apr)	Richard Fulmerston	Sir Edmund Rous
1554 (Nov)	Richard Fulmerston	Edward Hungerford
1555	Henry Clifford	David Seymour
1558	John Temple	George Hidden
1559	Francis Newdigate	Henry Clifford
1562–3	John Thynne	Stephen Hales
1571	Nicholas St John	Thomas Blagrave
1572	Simon Bowyer	George Ireland
1584	Richard Wheler	Roger Puleston
1586	Richard Wheler	Roger Puleston
1588	John Seymour	Henry Ughtred
1593	Thomas Hungerford	James Kirton
1597	Sir Anthony Hungerford	Francis Castilian
1601	Sir Anthony Hungerford	Levinus Munck
1604–1611	John Rodney	Sir Anthony Hungerford
1614	Robert Hyde	Sir Giles Mompesson
1621–1622	Sir Francis Popham	Sir Giles Mompesson
1624	Hugh Crompton	William Cholmeley
1625	Sir John Brooke	William Cholmeley
1626-?	John Selden	Sir Maurice Berkeley
1628	Edward Kyrton	Sir John Trevor
1629–1640	No Parliaments summoned	

=== 1640–1832 ===
Year	First member	First party	Second member	Second party
April 1640	Charles Seymour		Richard Hardinge	Royalist
November 1640	Sir Walter Smith	Royalist	Richard Hardinge	Royalist
February 1644	Smith and Harding disabled from sitting – both seats vacant			
1646	Edmund Harvey	Parliamentarian	Henry Hungerford	Parliamentarian
December 1648	Edmund Harvey	Parliamentarian	Hungerford not recorded as sitting after Pride's Purge	
1653	Great Bedwyn was unrepresented in the Barebones Parliament and the First and Second Parliaments of the Protectorate			
January 1659	Thomas Manley		Henry Hungerford	
May 1659	Colonel Edmund Harvey		One seat vacant	
1660	Robert Spencer		Thomas Gape	
1661	Duke Stonehouse		Henry Clerke	
1663	John Trevor		Henry Clerke	
1673	Daniel Finch		Henry Clerke	
February 1679	Francis Stonehouse		John Deane	
August 1679	Francis Stonehouse		William Finch	
1681	Sir John Ernle		John Wildman	
1685	Lemuel Kingdon		Thomas Loder	
1689	Sir Edmund Warneford		John Wildman	
1690	The Viscount Falkland		Sir Jonathan Raymond	
1694	Francis Stonehouse		Sir Jonathan Raymond	
1695	Francis Stonehouse		Admiral Sir Ralph Delaval	
1698	Francis Stonehouse		Charles Davenant	
1701	Francis Stonehouse		Michael Mitford	
1702	Francis Stonehouse		Hon. James Bruce	
May 1705	Sir George Byng		Nicholas Pollexfen	
December 1705	Lord Bruce		Nicholas Pollexfen	
November 1707	Lord Bruce		Tracy Pauncefort	
December 1707	Lord Bruce		Nicholas Pollexfen	
1708	Lord Bruce		Samuel Vanacker Sambrooke	
1710	Lord Bruce		Sir Edward Seymour	
1711	Thomas Millington		Sir Edward Seymour	
1715	Stephen Bisse		William Sloper	
1722	Robert Bruce		Charles Longueville	
1727	Sir William Willys		Viscount Lewisham	
1729	Sir William Willys		William Sloper	
1732	Francis Seymour		William Sloper	
1734	Brigadier Robert Murray		William Sloper	
1738	Edward Popham		William Sloper	
1741	Sir Edward Turner	Whig	Lascelles Metcalfe	
1747	William Sloper		Lascelles Metcalfe	
1754	William Sloper		Sir Robert Hildyard	
1756	Hon. Robert Brudenell		Sir Robert Hildyard	
1761	Vice Admiral Thomas Cotes		William Woodley	
1766	Vice Admiral Thomas Cotes		William Burke	
1767	Sir Thomas Fludyer		William Burke	
March 1768	Hon. James Brudenell		Hon. Robert Brudenell	
May 1768	Hon. James Brudenell		William Burke	
November 1768	William Northey		William Burke	
1771	Benjamin Hopkins		William Burke	
October 1774	The Earl of Courtown		Paul Methuen	
December 1774	Viscount Cranborne		Paul Methuen	
1780	Sir Merrick Burrell		Paul Methuen	
1781	Sir Merrick Burrell		Paul Cobb Methuen	
1784	Marquess of Graham		Lieutenant-Colonel Robert Manners	
June 1790	Marquess of Graham		Lord Doune	
December 1790	Viscount Stopford	Tory	Lord Doune	
1792	Viscount Stopford	Tory	Edward East	
1796	Lieutenant General the Hon. Thomas Bruce		John Wodehouse	
1797	Sir Robert Buxton		John Wodehouse	
1802	Sir Robert Buxton		Sir Nathaniel Dance-Holland, Bt	
1806	Viscount Stopford	Tory	James Henry Leigh	Tory
April 1807	Sir Vicary Gibbs	Tory	James Henry Leigh	Tory
May 1807	Sir John Nicholl	Tory	James Henry Leigh	Tory
March 1818	Sir John Nicholl	Tory	John Buxton	Tory
1832	Constituency abolished			
