= Isabella Seymour-Conway =

Isabella Seymour-Conway may refer to:

- Isabella Ingram-Seymour-Conway, Marchioness of Hertford (1759–1834)
- Isabella Seymour-Conway, Countess of Hertford (1726–1782)
