= Admiral Seymour =

Admiral Seymour may refer to:

- Beauchamp Seymour, 1st Baron Alcester (1821–1895), British Royal Navy admiral
- Edward Seymour (Royal Navy officer) (1840–1929), British Royal Navy admiral
- Edward Seymour, 1st Duke of Somerset (1500–1552), Lord High Admiral of England
- George Seymour (Royal Navy officer) (1787–1870), British Royal Navy admiral
- Lord Henry Seymour (naval commander) (1540–1588), English Navy vice admiral
- Lord Hugh Seymour (1759–1801), British Royal Navy vice admiral
- Michael Seymour (Royal Navy officer, born 1802) (1802–1887), British Royal Navy admiral
- Sir Michael Seymour, 1st Baronet (1768–1834), British Royal Navy rear admiral
- Thomas Seymour, 1st Baron Seymour of Sudeley (c. 1508–1549), Lord High Admiral of England
