= Edward Seymour =

Edward Seymour may refer to:

== Seymour family, English aristocrats ==
- Edward Seymour, 1st Duke of Somerset (c. 1500–1552), Lord Protector of England, 1547-49, during the minority of his nephew, Edward VI of England
- Lord Edward Seymour (died 1593) (c. 1528–1593), Sheriff of Devon, second son of the above
- Edward Seymour, 1st Earl of Hertford (1539–1621), fourth son of the Duke of Somerset
- Edward Seymour, Lord Beauchamp (1561–1612), son of the above
- Sir Edward Seymour, 1st Baronet (c. 1563–1613), English MP, son of Lord Edward Seymour
- Sir Edward Seymour, 2nd Baronet (c. 1580–1659), English MP, son of the above
- Sir Edward Seymour, 3rd Baronet (1610–1688), English MP, son of the above
- Sir Edward Seymour, 4th Baronet (1633–1708), English statesman who served as Treasurer of the Navy during the First Danby Ministry, son of the above
- Sir Edward Seymour, 5th Baronet (c. 1660–1741), English MP, son of the above
- Edward Seymour (Shaftesbury MP, died 1711), English MP, great-grandson of the 2nd Baronet
- Edward Seymour, 8th Duke of Somerset (1695–1757), son of the 5th Baronet
- Edward Seymour, 9th Duke of Somerset (1717–1792), son of the above
- Edward St Maur, 11th Duke of Somerset (Edward Seymour, 1775–1855), British landowner and amateur mathematician, grandson of the above
- Edward Seymour, 12th Duke of Somerset (1805–1885), son of the above
- Edward Seymour, 16th Duke of Somerset (1860–1931), great-great-great-grandson of the 8th Duke
- Sir Edward Seymour (British Army officer) (1877–1948), British Army officer and courtier, great-great-great-grandson of the 4th Baronet

== Others ==
- Edward Seymour (physician) (1796–1866), English physician, medical writer and cricketer
- Edward Seymour (Vermont politician) (1810–1883), Vermont farmer, businessman and politician
- Edward W. Seymour (1832–1892), Connecticut state representative
- Sir Edward Seymour (Royal Navy officer) (1840–1929), British admiral active during the Boxer Rebellion
- Edward A. Seymour (1887–1965), Wisconsin state assemblyman
- Edward Seymour (Irish cricketer) (1906–1980), Irish cricketer
