= Frances Seymour =

Frances Seymour may refer to:

- Frances Stewart, Duchess of Lennox (1578–1639), wife of Edward Seymour, 1st Earl of Hertford
- Frances Seymour, Duchess of Somerset (1599–1674), wife of William Seymour, 2nd Duke of Somerset
- Frances Darcy, Countess of Holderness (1618−1681), daughter of the above, previously Viscountess Molyneux and Countess of Southampton
- Frances Seymour, Lady Hungerford (bef. 1654–1716), daughter of Charles Seymour, 2nd Baron Seymour of Trowbridge
- Frances Seymour, Duchess of Somerset (1699–1754), wife of Algernon Seymour, 7th Duke of Somerset
- Frances Ford Seymour (1908–1950), Canadian-American socialite, second wife of Henry Fonda and mother of Jane and Peter Fonda

== See also ==
- Francis Seymour (disambiguation)
