= SEEMORE =

SEEMORE SAT CHANNEL is a Croatian pay per view satellite platform owned by OIV company. Introduced in 2005, it was the first project of this kind in Croatia. It has 25.000 users and broadcasts 45 channels. SEEMORE is operating in Croatia, Slovenia, Serbia, Montenegro, Bosnia and Herzegovina and North Macedonia.

- HBO
- N1
- Al Jazeera Balkans
- CNN International
- CCTV News
- NHK World TV
- RT
- SABC News International
- i24news
- Sky News
- National Geographic Channel
- Nat Geo Wild
- Nat Geo Music
- CBS Reality
- CMC
- CBS Europa
- BabyTV
- Jim Jam
- MTV Adria
- C Music TV
- Hustler TV
- Eurosport
- Euronews
- CNBC Europe
- Disney Channel
- Cartoon Network
- Boomerang
- Turner Classic Movies
- Nick Jr. Channel
- Nickelodeon
- Disney Junior
- Disney Cinemagic
- AMC
- Sundance Channel
- ShortsTV
- Fox Life
- Fox Crime
- 24Kitchen
- Travel Channel EMEA
- Motors TV
- FUEL TV
- Fashion One
- E!
- Comedy Central Extra
- France 24

== Sources ==
- http://www.croatiabiz.com/info_lnews-article.php?ID=21805 (in Croatian)
