= Anthony Hungerford of Down Ampney =

16th-century English politician

Sir Anthony Hungerford of Down Ampney, Gloucestershire (born by 1492, died 18 November 1558) was an English soldier, sheriff, and courtier during the reign of Henry VIII of England, and briefly Member of Parliament for Gloucestershire.

== Biography ==
Hungerford was the eldest son of Sir John Hungerford of Down Ampney and Margaret, daughter of Edward Blount of Mangotsfield. He may have had some training in law. He was knighted after the siege of Tournai in October 1513. After succeeding to his inheritance on the death of his father in 1524, he took a prominent part in court ceremonial occasions.

Hungerford was active in acquiring land. In 1536 he wrote to Thomas Cromwell requesting that he be granted lands formerly belonging to a priory in Wiltshire and he purchased four manors in Wiltshire and Oxfordshire for £1,935. His second marriage brought him an interest in Berkshire and he was included in commissions for that county.

Hungerford was sheriff of three counties: Sheriff of Wiltshire 1527–8, 1538–9 1544–5, and 1556–7. Sheriff of Oxfordshire and Berkshire 1536–7 and Sheriff of Gloucestershire 1553–4. As well as his civic duties he continued his military career. He joined the army in the north in 1536. He was with the army in France in 1544 under Thomas Howard, 3rd Duke of Norfolk, and late the same year on the Scottish border as a captain with 100 men under Edward Seymour, 1st Earl of Hertford.

In 1550 he was brought before the Court of the Star Chamber, accused of abusing his position as a justice of the peace by ignoring the actions of some members of Brydges family (who were related to him through his first marriage), one of whom had refused to carry out a Privy Council order to remove some altars, and another who was sheltering an alleged felon. It may have been his close association with the Brydges that helped secure him election to Parliament as a knight of the shire for Gloucestershire to Queen May's first Parliament (1553). He was appointed Sheriff of Gloucestershire during the Parliament's second session.

He made his will on 31 August about three months before he died on 18 November 1558. In the will he mentions seven sons and seven daughters, including his eldest son John; executors of the will were John and Anthony's wife.

== Family ==
Hungerford married twice. Around 1515 he married Jane, daughter of Sir Edward Darrell of Littlecote, Wiltshire. They had five sons including Anthony (died 1589), Edward (died 1572) and John (died 1582) and possibly a daughter.

He married secondly Dorothy, daughter of Sir John Danvers of Dauntsey, Wiltshire and widow of John Fettiplace (died 1524) of East Shefford, Berkshire. They had two sons and two daughters, and at least three other children.

== Notes ==
Political offices
Preceded by Thomas Carter	High Sheriff of Berkshire and Oxfordshire; 1536–1537	Succeeded by Sir Simon Harcourt
