= John Seymour (died 1567) =

English politician

John Seymour (by 1523–1567), of Great Marlow, Buckinghamshire, was an English politician.

He was a member (MP) of the parliament of England for Great Bedwyn in 1545.
