= Thomas Seymour =

Thomas or Tom Seymour may refer to:

- Thomas Seymour, 1st Baron Seymour of Sudeley (1508–1549), English nobleman
- Thomas H. Seymour (1807–1868), U.S. representative from Connecticut
- Thomas Day Seymour (1848–1907), American classical scholar
- Thomas Seymour (1896–1984), British director who worked under the name Walter Forde
- Tommy Seymour (footballer) (1906–1983), English footballer, trainer and physio
- Tommy Seymour (born 1988), Scottish rugby player
- Thomas Seymour (MP) (died 1535), MP for London, 1529
- Tom Seymour (chief executive), former CEO of PwC in Australia
- Tom Seymour (politician), member of the North Dakota Senate

== See also ==
- Thomas Seamer (1632–1712), founding settler of Norwalk, Connecticut
