= Seymore =

Seymore is both a surname and given name. Notable people and characters with the name include:

- Andre Seymore (born 1975), South African cricketer
- Seymore Butts (born 1964), American pornographic film director and producer
- Seymore D. Fair, mascot of the 1984 Louisiana World Exposition
- Will Seymore (born 1992), American soccer player

== See also ==
- Seemore (disambiguation)
- Seymour (disambiguation)
