= William Seymour =

William Seymour may refer to:

- William Seymour (MP for Herefordshire) (died 1391), MP for Herefordshire (UK Parliament constituency)
- William Digby Seymour (1805–1872), MP for Kingston-upon-Hull
- William Digby Seymour (1822–1895), QC, lawyer and poet, MP for Sunderland and Somerset
- William H. Seymour (1840–1913), American politician
- William J. Seymour (1870–1922), American Pentecostal minister
- William Kean Seymour (1887–1975), British writer
- William Seymour Jr. (1818–1882), American banker who twice served as president of the New York Stock Exchange
- William Seymour (Congressman) (1775–1848), US representative from New York from 1835 to 1837
- William Seymour (British Army officer, born 1664) (1664–1728), lieutenant-general, MP for Cockermouth, Totnes and Newport (Isle of Wight)
- William Seymour, 2nd Duke of Somerset (1588–1660)
- William Seymour, 3rd Duke of Somerset (1652–1671)
- William Seymour Tyler (1810–1897), American historian
- William Henry Seymour (1829–1921), British Army officer
- Lord William Seymour (British Army officer) (1838–1915), senior British Army officer
