= Thomas Benger =

English knight and Master of the Revels (died 1572)

Sir Thomas Benger (ca. 1520? – 1572) succeeded Sir Thomas Cawarden as Elizabeth I's Master of the Revels on 18 January 1560. He served until 1572 when it appears Sir Thomas Blagrave stepped in. Benger was considered to be an ineffectual master of the revels, purely on account that a charter for his successor hadn't been drawn up at his death. Benger had been a loyal member of the Princess Elizabeth's household at Hatfield during the several imprisonments she had suffered under her sister, Mary I.

On 5 June 1555, he had been examined by Secretary Bourne, the Master of the Rolls, Sir Francis Englefield, Sir Richard Read and Doctor Hughes, "upon such points as they shall gather out of their former confessions, touching their lewd & vain practises of calculating or conjuring, presently sent unto them with the said letters." In 1559, he was elected to Parliament for Lancaster.

Benger produced forty-six plays and masques that dealt with the factional intrigues surrounding the Queen's marriage negotiations between 1560 and 1572. In December 1560, George Brediman, keeper of the wardrobe at Westminster, sent him cloth of gold, tinsel, "bawdkin", and satin fabrics for "masking garments".

Only eleven of his plays were performed by adult acting troupes, notably the Gray's Inn Men, and it is thought to be his group of child actors to which William Shakespeare refers in Hamlet act ii, scene ii, "an aery of children, little eyases that cry out on the top of question and are most tyrannically clapped for it: these are now the fashion; and so berattle the common stages that many wearing rapiers are afraid to goose quills and dare scarce come hither."

Benger's use of boy actors from Children of Paul's, realistic three-dimensional scenery, and stage effects, were to define the courtly entertainments of Elizabeth's reign and set the standard required from the noble lords the Queen visited on her regular summer progressions.

Benger found the financial burden of the office too much for his family to bear and he made a special plea to the Queen as 'one of the last of the poor flock of Hatfield' to pay off his debts when he died as 'the charges for making of masks cam never to so little a sum as they do this year.' (Note: see The Staging of Court Drama to 1595 by AA Helmholtz-Phelan.)

Benger died in 1572, though his will was not finally proved until 1577.

| Preceded by Sir Thomas Cawarden | Master of the Revels; 1560–1572 | Succeeded by Sir Thomas Blagrave |
