= Simon Bowyer =

English politician (c. 1550 – 1606)

Simon Bowyer (c. 1550 – 1606) was the member of the Parliament of England for Great Bedwyn for the parliament of 1572.

Bowyer, a gentleman usher at the Elizabethan court, was appointed keeper of a coastal fort, St Andrew's Castle, Hamble, in 1577. He was instructed to employ a porter, a master gunner, and six soldiers or gunners.
