= Walter Hungerford =

Walter Hungerford may refer to several Englishmen:

- Walter Hungerford, 1st Baron Hungerford (1378–1449), Knight of the Garter, nobleman and Speaker of the House of Commons
- Walter Hungerford, 1st Baron Hungerford of Heytesbury (1503–1540), the first person in England to be executed under the Buggery Act 1533
- Sir Walter Hungerford of Farleigh (died 1516), fought for Henry VII at the Battle of Bosworth Field, and served on the Privy Council for both Henry VII and Henry VIII
- Sir Walter Hungerford (Knight of Farley) (1532–1596), landowner, called "the Knight of Farley" for his sporting abilities
- Walter Hungerford (MP) (1675–1754), landowner and MP for Calne
