= George Seymour (cricketer) =

English cricketer and barrister

Personal information
- Full name: George Alexander Seymour
- Born: 16 September 1816; Bristol, England
- Died: 3 July 1838 (aged 21); Cambridge, Cambridgeshire, England
- Batting: Unknown

Domestic team information
- Years: Team
- 1836–1838: Cambridge University

Career statistics
Competition	First-class
Matches	6
Runs scored	77
Batting average	7.70
100s/50s	–/–
Top score	20
Catches/stumpings	3/–
- Source: Cricinfo, 27 April 2021

George Alexander Seymour (16 September 1816 – 3 July 1838) was an English first-class cricketer.

The son of The Reverend George Seymour, he was born at Bristol in September 1816. He was educated at Eton College, before going up to King's College, Cambridge. While studying at Cambridge, he played first-class cricket for Cambridge University in 1836 and 1838, making six appearances. Seymour scored 77 runs in his six matches, with a highest score of 20. Seymour died while still studying at Cambridge, dying from kidney disease at 4 pm on 3 July 1838.
