= Anthony Hungerford (Roundhead) =

Hungerford should not be confused with his namesake and contemporary, the Royalist Member of Parliament Anthony Hungerford

Anthony Hungerford (1614/15?–1657) was a Colonel in the English Parliamentary army who fought in Ireland during the War of the Three Kingdoms.

== Biography ==
In September 1646, Anthony Hungerford, then Major Hungerford, pressed for a commission as governor of the parliamentarian garrison at Stoke and for an appointment as Major of the standing companies in Shropshire. In March 1647 the parliament seems to have accepted his services, and as a Colonel, sent him to Ireland, where he landed on 30 April 1647. He was colonel of a regiment at Drogheda in 1648.

In 1650, after being shot in the head at the Battle of Dungan's Hill in County Meath, he returned to England, where he busied himself in 'discovering' papists' and other delinquents' estates. In July 1652 the council of state granted him £100 to enable him to return to Ireland. He was in 1653 a prisoner for debt in the "upper bench" in London, and petitioned parliament for payment of his commission as a debtor. According to a certificate from Sir John Danvers, he was "of most honest and religious conversation, very free from the common vices of swearing, drunkenness, &c., and most valiant and faithful" in the service of the parliament.

He obtained leave to return to Ireland, but on 28 March 1654 his regiment was disbanded, and he himself was left in urgent need. A weekly pension of 20s. was granted him by the Council of State on 17 April 1655. He died on 9 June 1657.

== Family ==
Sir Bernard Burke writing in 1884, based on information supplied by William Roberts (the Ulster Herald between 1643 and 1655), said that Anthony Hungerford was descended from Sir John Hungerford of Down Ampney in Gloucestershire, (Anthony's great-grandfather) through his second son Henry Hungerford of Marston in Wiltshire, whose son, also Henry Hungerford of Marston was Anthony's father. William John Hardy writing in the Dictionary of National Biography, in a volume published in 1891, suggested that he may possibly have been the "brother or half-brother of the royalist Anthony, for the Hungerfords often gave the same Christian name to more than one of their children", but Stephen Wright updating Hardy's article for the Oxford Dictionary of Biography suggests that "he may have been the son of Thomas Hungerford, gentleman of Garsdon, Wiltshire. As a young child he was acquainted with Sir John Danvers (died 1655) of Dauntsey, an estate close to properties owned by a junior branch of the Hungerford family at Garsdon. For this reason he could be the Anthony Hungerford who on 9 November 1632 matriculated from Queen's College, Oxford, at the age of seventeen, the son of Thomas of Garsdon".

In 1658 his widow, Chrisagon, petitioned Oliver Cromwell for relief. The petition was passed to the committee at Ely House, but no record exists as to whether she was granted relief.
