= George Ireland (English politician) =

16th-century English politician

George Ireland (died 1596) was the member of the Parliament of England for Great Bedwyn for the parliament of 1572 and for Appleby for the parliament of 1584.
