= Conway Francis =

English cricketer

Conway Francis (27 April 1870 – 15 April 1924) was an English cricketer. He was a right-handed batsman and a right-arm fast bowler who played for Gloucestershire. He was born in Clifton and died in Staple Hill.

Francis made a single first-class appearance for the side, during the 1895 season, against Kent. From the upper-middle order, he scored 8 runs in the only innings in which he batted, in which WG Grace scored 257 runs.
