= Allyn Merriam Hungerford =

American physician

Allyn Merriam Hungerford (August 16, 1810 – June 17, 1883) was a 19th-century American medical doctor, Connecticut legislator, and judge.

Hungerford was born in Watertown, Conn., August 16, 1810. He graduated from Yale Medical School in 1839. After graduation he practiced his profession for a short time in Hartford, Conn., and then in Cincinnati, Ohio, but in 1844 returned to Watertown, where he continued his medical practice and also managed a farm. He was a member of the Medical Society of Connecticut.

He married Emily Platt, of Prospect, Conn., who died July 15, 1880. They had two children, Sarah and William.

Dr. Hungerford was a prominent citizen. In addition to his medical practice, he represented Watertown in the Connecticut State Legislature in the sessions of 1850 and 1851, and was Judge of Probate in the Watertown district in the years 1851, 1852, 1877, and 1878.

He died of apoplexy on June 17, 1883, at age 73.

This article incorporates public domain material from the 1884 Yale Obituary Record.
