= Justice Seymour =

Justice Seymour may refer to:

- Augustus T. Seymour (1907–1965), associate justice of the New Mexico Supreme Court
- Edward Woodruff Seymour (1832–1892), associate justice of the Connecticut Supreme Court
- Origen S. Seymour (1804–1881), associate justice of the Connecticut Supreme Court

== See also ==
- Judge Seymour (disambiguation)
