= John Temple (MP for Ripon) =

16th-century English politician

John Temple (1518/19 – 1558 or later) was an English politician.

He was a member (MP) of the parliament of England for Ripon in April 1554 and for Great Bedwyn in 1558.
