= William Plomer (MP for Great Bedwyn) =

English politician

William Plomer (fl. 1382–1390), of Great Bedwyn, Wiltshire, was an English politician.

He was a member (MP) of the parliament of England for Great Bedwyn in May 1382, October 1382, October 1383, November 1384, 1385 and January 1390.
