= Henry Seymour =

Henry Seymour may refer to:

== United Kingdom ==
- Henry Seymour (16th-century MP) (1503–1578), member of parliament (MP) for Hampshire in 1547, brother of Queen Jane Seymour and uncle of Edward VI of England
- Henry Seymour (Langley) (1612–1687), friend of Charles II and MP for East Looe
- Henry Seymour (died 1728), English MP
- Henry Seymour (Redland) (1729–1807), MP for Totnes, Huntingdon, Evesham, lover of Madame du Barry
- Henry Seymour (Knoyle) (1776–1849), MP for Taunton
- Henry Seymour, 9th Marquess of Hertford (born 1958), British peer
- Henry Seymour, Lord Beauchamp (1626–1654), English nobleman
- Lord Henry Seymour (naval commander), English admiral who fought the Spanish Armada
- Lord Henry Seymour (politician) (1746–1830), MP for Coventry, Midhurst, Downton
- Sir Henry Seymour, 1st Baronet (1674–1714), MP for East Looe
- Henry Danby Seymour (1820–1877), MP for Poole
- Henry Seymour (Royal Navy officer) (1818–1869), naval commander and politician
- Henry Seymour (secularist) (1861–1938), secularist, anarchist and gramophone innovator

== Other ==
- Henry Seymour (New Zealand politician) (1796–1883), member of the New Zealand Legislative Council
- Henry W. Seymour (1834–1906), U.S. representative for Michigan
- Henry Seymour (New York politician) (1780–1837), New York politician
- Henry Seymour (pastoralist) (1799–1869), Irish lawyer migrated to South Australia 1840
