= Horatio Seymour (disambiguation) =

Horatio Seymour (1810–1886) was Governor of New York.

Horatio Seymour may also refer to:

- Horatio Seymour (Vermont politician) (1778–1857), U.S. Senator from Vermont
- Horatio Seymour (Erie County, NY) (1813–1872), New York assemblyman
- Horatio Seymour, Jr. (1844–1907), New York State Engineer
