= Jane Seymour (disambiguation) =

Jane Seymour (c. 1508–1537) was the queen consort of England, third wife of Henry VIII and mother of Edward VI.

Jane Seymour may also refer to:

- Lady Jane Seymour (c. 1541–1561), niece of the above, writer
- Lady Jane Seymour (c. 1637–1679), daughter of William Seymour, 2nd Duke of Somerset and wife of Charles Boyle, 3rd Viscount Dungarvan
- Jane Seymour (actress) (born 1951), English actress and writer
- Jane Seymour (Canadian actress) (1893–1956), Canadian-American actress
- Jane Georgiana Seymour, Duchess of Somerset (1809–1884)
- BSS Jane Seymour, a video game
