= James Seymour (Michigan politician) =

American politician (1791–1864)

Member of the Michigan Senate from the 24th district
- In office January 1, 1857 – 1858
- Preceded by: Wilder De Ayr Foster
- Succeeded by: Alexander P. Davis

Member of the Michigan House of Representatives from the Genesee County 1st district
- In office January 1, 1853 – 1854

Personal details
- Born: April 10, 1791 Hartford County, Connecticut, US
- Died: December 30, 1864 (aged 73) Lansing, Michigan, US
- Party: Republican
- Spouse: Mira Abigail

James Seymour (April 10, 1791 – December 30, 1864) was a Michigan politician.

== Early life ==
Seymour was born in Hartford County, Connecticut on April 10, 1791.

== Political career ==
On January 5, 1853, Seymour was sworn in as a member of the Michigan House of Representatives from the Genesee County 1st district as a Republican. He served in this seat until 1854. He was then sworn in as a member of the Michigan Senate on January 7, 1857, where he served until 1858.

== Personal life ==
Seymour married Mira Abigail Hill in 1818.

== Death ==
Seymour died on December 30, 1864, in Lansing, Michigan. He is interred at Flushing City Cemetery.
