= Henry Clifford (died 1577) =

English politician

Henry Clifford (by 1513 – 1577) was an English politician.

He was a member (MP) of the parliament of England for Salisbury in 1547 and for Great Bedwyn in 1555 and 1559.
