= David Seymour (English politician) =

16th-century English politician

David Seymour (died 1557/58) was the member of the Parliament of England for Wareham for the parliament of 1547, and for Great Bedwyn for the parliament of 1555.
