= Anthony Hungerford (Royalist) =

English Member of Parliament

Hungerford should not be confused with his namesake and contemporary, the Parliamentarian Colonel Anthony Hungerford

Anthony Hungerford of Black Bourton (1607/08–1657), was an English Member of Parliament who supported the Royalist cause during the English Civil War.

== Biography ==
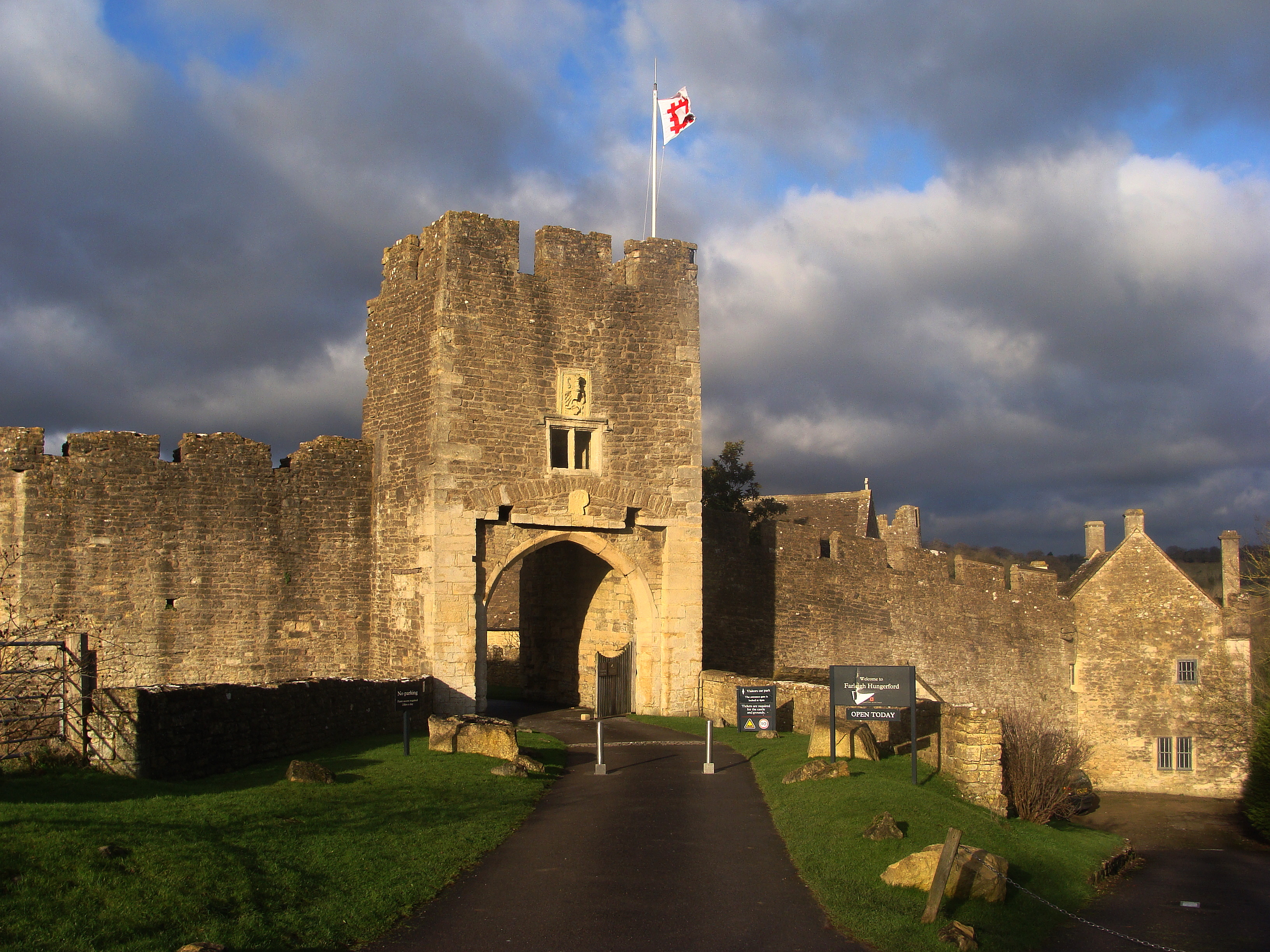
Farleigh Hungerford East Gate

Anthony Hungerford was the son, by his second marriage, of Sir Anthony Hungerford of Black Bourton (1564–1627), and half-brother of Sir Edward Hungerford (1596–1648).

Anthony Hungerford was elected in 1640 to both the Short and Long parliaments as a member of Malmesbury. As a royalist, he sat in the king's Oxford Parliament during its first session from December 1643 to March 1644. He was heavily fined for his delinquency by the Long Parliament and was committed to the Tower of London in 1644.

He was apparently at liberty in October 1644. According to a statement which he drew up in 1646, to excuse himself from paying the fine imposed on him, he never took up arms for the king: went after the battle of Edgehill to his house in Black Bourton, Oxfordshire; was carried thence by a troop of the king's horse to the 'assembly' at Oxford, where he gave no vote against the parliament, and soon after returning home, purposely rode to the parliamentary camp at Burford, where he was taken prisoner. His fine was reduced, but he was still unable to pay it, and in 1648 orders were given for the seizure of his estate. In December 1652, Cromwell wrote a sympathetic note to him.

== Family ==
Anthony Hungerford married Rachel (died January 1679-80), daughter of Rice Jones of Astall, Oxfordshire, by whom he had twelve children. Anthony Hungerford succeeded to Farleigh Castle in 1653 as heir of his half-brother Edward. He died there on 18 August 1657. He was buried in Black Bourton Church on 15 September 1657. His children included:

- Edward (1632–1711) - his heir and oldest son
- Colonel Anthony Hungerford (died 1703) - who entered Sir Nicholas Armorer's service as a secret agent in England, in the royalist interest, in 1655, in the hope, it is said, of obtaining his elder brother's estate. He died on 7 June 1703, in his sixty-ninth year, and was buried in the Hungerford chapel of Bourton Church, where his monument is preserved.
- Rachel - who married Henry Cary, 4th Viscount Falkland, at Black Bourton on 14 April 1653.
