= Thomas Cawarden =

English politician and Master of the Revels (died 1559)

Sir Thomas Cawarden (died 25 August 1559) of Bletchingley, Nonsuch Park and East Horsley (Surrey) was Master of the Revels to Henry VIII, Edward VI, and Mary I.

== Background ==
Thomas was the son of William Cawarden, a cloth-fuller and citizen of London. In 1528, he was apprenticed to a mercer in London, Owen Hawkins. By 1542, Thomas Cawarden had married. His wife's first name was Elizabeth; her surname is unknown.

== Career ==
In 1542 and 1547 he was elected member of parliament for Bletchingley which did not have town status and had a smaller forty-shilling freeholder electorate than the average of the time, poor enough to be challenged in the courts in 1614.

In 1544 Sir Thomas Cawarden received a patent as Master of Revels and Tents, becoming the first head of an independent office and was knighted at Boulogne in September of that year. Tents were provided for festivals, royal progresses, and in military expeditions. In July and August 1547, Cawarden provided 'hales', 'roundhouses', and a kitchen tent for the mission to Scotland during the war of the Rough Wooing which culminated in the Battle of Pinkie. Cawarden paid for the tents which had been 'wetted in the shippe' to be dried and put away on their return.

In 1545, Cawarden acquired a book of Hans Holbein's patterns from the costume maker Mark Milliner. Cawarden also recorded the purchase of a "peynted book" of Hans Holbein's making for £6, and this is sometimes associated with the series of portrait drawings in the Royal Collection.

Lady Jane Grey as queen requested tents on 19 July 1553. On 1 January 1559 Mary I ordered her officers to collect arms and armour from Cawarden's house to counter Wyatt's rebellion. Seventeen wagon loads were taken. The patent also allowed him to keep 40 armed and liveried servants at Bletchingley Castle or Palace.

Soon after his appointment, the revels office and its stores were transferred to a dissolved Dominican monastery at Blackfriars, having previously been housed at Warwick Inn in the city, the London Charterhouse, and then at the priory of St. John of Jerusalem in Clerkenwell, to which a return was made after Cawarden's death.

He was appointed High Sheriff of Surrey and Sussex for 1547–48, keeper of Hampton Court in 1550 and joint Lieutenant of the Tower of London (with Sir Edward Warner) in November–December 1558.

Cawarden formally obtained Bletchingley, which had been the home of Anne of Cleves, on 7 April 1547. He was also keeper of the house and gardens of Nonsuch Palace from 1543 to November 1556. Between 1547 and 1559 he was four times elected knight of the shire for Surrey.

In 1551 Cawarden built a banqueting house in Hyde Park with Lawrence Bradshaw, surveyor of works. Cawarden was in charge of the interior decoration by the painters Antony Toto and John Leades. This by 1556 had been largely superseded by his own Banqueting House at Nonsuch Park close to the original Nonsuch Palace, at the foot of the North Downs which he had been granted in 1547 by King Edward ("a messuage and lands in the manor of Nonsuch alias Cuddington") to hold for 21 years for a rent of £5 5s. 8d equivalent to £3,819 in 2025.

== Death ==
Cawarden's place and date of death has been variously reported. He is said to have died at East Horsley on 25 or 29 August 1559, or according to sources used by John Strype, at Nonsuch Palace. A draft of his will is dated 24 August. Recent research suggests that he died at West Horsley Place, where he may have been supervising work for a royal visit.

His body was taken from Horsley to Bletchingley for burial on 5 September. A brass plate intended for Thomas Cawarden's monument was found at Loseley Park, the home of his executor, Sir William More, in the 19th century. It gives his date of death as 25 August. Cawarden was succeeded as Master of the Revels by Sir Thomas Benger.

== Loseley manuscripts ==
Thomas Cawarden's official papers survived at his executor's descendants' house at Loseley Park. These were moved into public collections. A catalogue of the papers in the Folger Shakespeare Library collection is available on-line. Other revels papers are available to study at the National Archives, Kew, and the Surrey Record Office, Woking. Extracts from the papers were first published by Alfred Kempe in 1836, and by the Historical Manuscripts Commission in 1879.

== Inventory of the revels costume and royal tents ==
An inventory was made of the costumes kept by Thomas Cawarden as Master of Revels. This includes embroidered coverings and bards for horses. Masque clothes for men include sets of 12 long garments of cloth of gold, of silver, and of crimson satin, and other sets for suites of masquers. Eight masquers dressed as "Turks" with head pieces in "Turkish fashion". There were clothes for performers to dress as falconers, as Germans or "Allmaynes", and as monks. There were masks with and without beards, masks for disguise as Germans, pilgrim's staffs, halberds, and shepherds' crooks.

Costume for women included kirtles and sleeves, Italian gowns, costume for "frowes" or German wives, garments to disguise as African people called "Mores" with wigs of hair (made by Niccolo da Modena), and as Egyptians or Gypsies. The royal tents included the king's lodging tent, really a group of connecting tents, his lesser lodging tent, a dining house, and decorative hangings and accessories. Cawarden was also responsible for the tents sent into Scotland with the army of the Rough Wooing.

== Footnotes ==
=== References ===
- Feuillerat, Albert (1914). Documents Relating to the Office of the Revels. Louvain.
- Kempe, Alfred John, ed. (1836). The Loseley Manuscripts. London: John Murray.
- Robison, William B. (2008). "Cawarden, Sir Thomas (c.1514–1559)'". Oxford Dictionary of National Biography (online ed.). Oxford University Press. doi:10.1093/ref:odnb/37270. ISBN 978-0-19-861412-8. (Subscription, Wikipedia Library access or UK public library membership required.)
- Starkey, David, ed. (1998). The Inventory of Henry VIII. Society of Antiquaries.
