= Francis Seymour =

Francis Seymour may refer to:

- Francis Seymour, 1st Baron Seymour of Trowbridge (c. 1590–1664)
- Francis Seymour, 5th Duke of Somerset (1658–1678)
- Francis Seymour, of Sherborne, Dorset (1697–1761), Member of Parliament
- Francis Seymour, 5th Marquess of Hertford (1812–1884)
- Sir Francis Seymour, 1st Baronet (1813–1890), British Army officer and courtier
- Lord Francis Seymour (1725–1799), clergyman of the Church of England
- Frank Seymour (1904–1987), Australian rules footballer

== See also ==
- Francis Seymour-Conway, 1st Baron Conway (1679–1732)
- Francis Seymour-Conway, 1st Marquess of Hertford (1718–1794)
- Francis Seymour-Conway, 3rd Marquess of Hertford (1777–1842)
- Francis Ingram-Seymour-Conway, 2nd Marquess of Hertford (1743–1822)
- Frances Seymour (disambiguation)
