= Anthony Hungerford of Black Bourton =

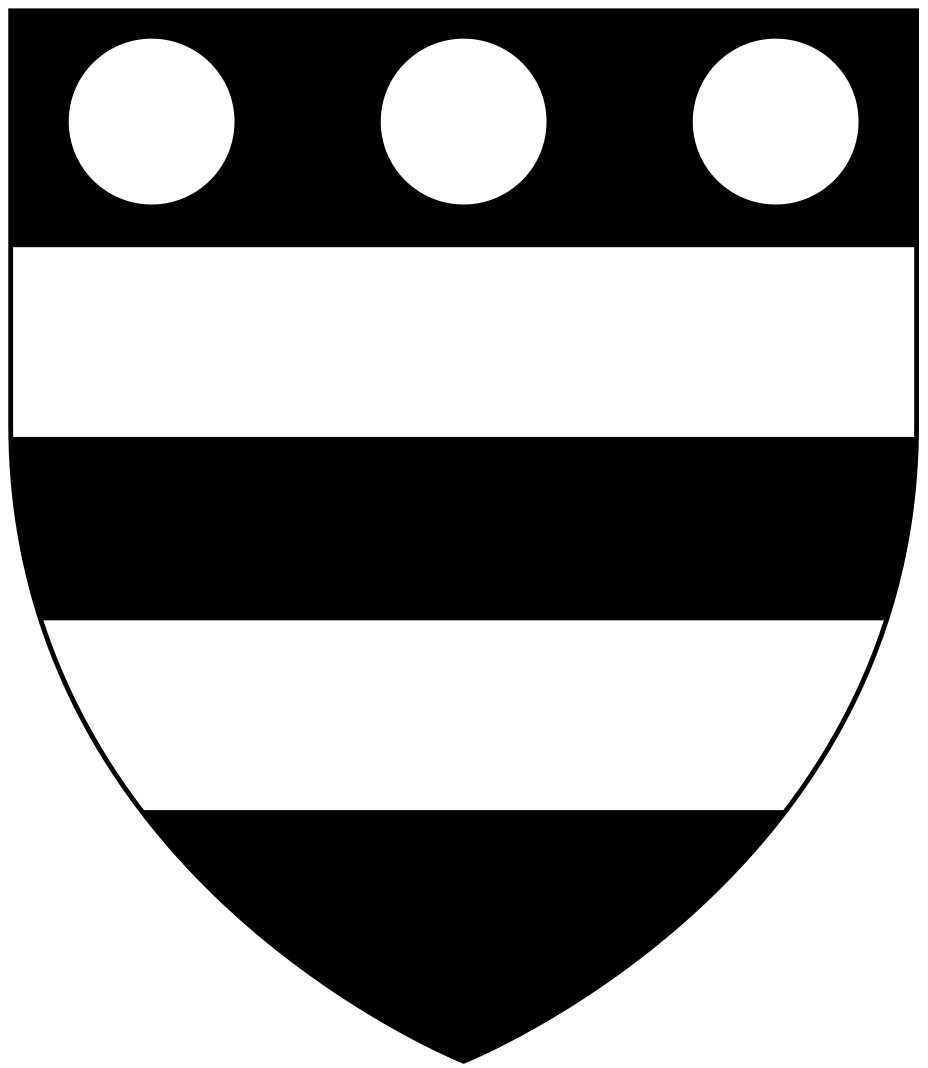
Arms of Hungerford: sable, two bars argent in chief three plates

Sir Anthony Hungerford (1567–1627) of Black Bourton in Oxfordshire, Deputy Lieutenant of Wiltshire until 1624, was a member of parliament and a religious controversialist.

== Origins ==
Hungerford was born in 1567 at Great Bedwyn in Wiltshire, the son of Anthony Hungerford (died 1589) of Down Ampney in Gloucestershire, a descendant of Sir Edmund Hungerford, second son of Walter Hungerford, 1st Baron Hungerford of Farleigh and Heytesbury. His mother was Bridget Shelley, daughter of John Shelley, and granddaughter of Sir William Shelley, Justice of the Common Pleas. His father was a Puritan, but his mother was a devout Roman Catholic, the religion in which Hungerford was raised.

== Career ==
On 12 April 1583 aged 16, Hungerford matriculated at St John's College, Oxford, which he left without taking a degree. (Note: It is not clear if he went down from Oxford because of family financial difficulties, or because of his admittance to the Roman Catholic church.) However, he was granted the degree of M.A. on 9 July 1594. After being uncertain regarding his religious beliefs and Catholic upbringing, in 1588 at the time of the Spanish Armada and the threat from Catholic Spain, Hungerford embraced the reformed religion. He was knighted on 15 February 1608, and served as a Deputy Lieutenant of Wiltshire until 1624, when he resigned the office in favour of his son Edward. He was elected Member of Parliament for Marlborough in Wiltshire, for Queen Elizabeth I's 8th Parliament in 1593, and sat for Great Bedwyn, Wiltshire, in the next three consecutive Parliaments, in 1597, 1601, and the first Parliament of King James I in 1604.

In 1624, he was brought to court for removing an ash tree from the common land at Black Bourton.

== Marriages and children ==
Hungerford married twice:

- Firstly to Lucy Hungerford, a daughter of Sir Walter Hungerford (died c.1596) of Farleigh Castle in Wiltshire, by whom he had children including: (Note: The sources vary as to the number of children. Henry Lancaster states in the ODNB (published in 2009) "The couple had one son, Edward Hungerford (1596–1648) and two daughters before Lucy died on 4 June 1598", but in The History of Parliament (published 2010) he states "Bridget, Hungerford’s only daughter from his first marriage, married Alexander Chocke".)
  - Sir Edward Hungerford (1596–1648), eldest son and heir, a Roundhead commander during the Civil War.
  - Bridget Hungerford, who married three times, firstly to Alexander Chocke (1594–1625) of Shalbourne, secondly to John Rudhale and thirdly to John Vaughan, of Herefordshire, a Roman Catholic.
- Secondly he married Sarah Crouch, daughter of John Crouch of the City of London, by whom he had several further children, including:
  - Anthony Hungerford, a Cavalier during the Civil War.
  - John Hungerford.
  - Giles Hungerford.

== Death and burial ==
He died in late June 1627 and was buried in Black Bourton Church. He left funds to support apprentices in his native town of Great Bedwyn.

== Writings ==
Some of his writings were published posthumously at Oxford in 1639 by his son Edward, including:

- "The advice of a son professing the religion established in the present church of England to his dear mother, a Roman catholic".
- "The memorial of a father to his dear children, containing an acknowledgement of God'? great mercy in bringing him to the profession of the true religion at this present established in the church of England", completed at Black Bourton in April 1627.
