= Thomas Blagrave =

English surveyor and Master of the Revels (died 1590)

Thomas Blagrave (died 18 June 1590) was Acting Master of the Revels (1573–1579) and Surveyor of the Queen's Works (1578–1590) under Queen Elizabeth I of England.

Thomas came from Uttoxeter in Staffordshire and had at least three siblings, William, John and Mary. Burke's Landed Gentry states, "John Blagrave, of Uttoxeter, County Stafford, was father, with a son Richard, who was father of Thomas Blagrave, Master of the Queen's Revels, who rf. 18 June 1590, leaving by his wife, Joane, daughter of William Bellame, a daughter Mary, married to William Lodge, son and heir of Sir Thomas Lodge, of London, and a son and heir, John, who married Joane Bodenham, of Gloucester." These Blagraves, distantly related, married into the family of Blagrave of Calcot Park, near Reading, Berkshire.

Thomas Blagrave started his career at court as assistant to Sir Thomas Cawarden, Master of the Revels, and in his will of 1559 he left Blagrave two geldings and a colt. Acting as Master of the Revels from 1573 to 1579 he was assisted by John Drawater, a servant of the Earl of Oxford, with whom he had a court battle in the early 1590s. He owned land at Great Bedwyn in Wiltshire, where he built the manor house.
