= Master of the Revels =

Position in the British royal household

- Revels Office
- Style: The Right Honourable
- Appointer: The British monarch
- Term length: No fixed term
- Inaugural holder: Walter Halliday
- Formation: 1347

The Master of the Revels was the holder of a position within the English, and later the British, royal household, heading the "Revels Office" or "Office of the Revels". The Master of the Revels was an executive officer under the Lord Chamberlain. Originally he was responsible for overseeing royal festivities, known as revels, and he later also became responsible for stage censorship, until this function was transferred to the Lord Chamberlain in 1624. However, Henry Herbert, the deputy Master of the Revels and later the Master, continued to perform the function on behalf of the Lord Chamberlain until the English Civil War in 1642, when stage plays were prohibited. The office continued almost until the end of the 18th century, although with rather reduced status.

== History ==
The Revels Office has an influential role in the history of the English stage. Among the expenses of the royal Wardrobe in 1347, there was provision for tunicae and viseres (shirts and hats) for the Christmas ludi (plays) of Edward III. During the reign of King Henry VII, payments are also recorded for various forms of court revels; and it became regular, apparently, to appoint a special functionary, called Master of the Revels, to superintend the royal festivities, quite distinct from the Lord of Misrule.

In Henry VIII's court, the post became more important, following the burgeoning of courtly shows, plays and masques. To support the increased demand for theatrical entertainment, an officer of the Wardrobe was permanently employed to act under the Master of the Revels. Under Elizabeth I the Office of the Revels was further increased and was subdivided into Toyles, Revels and Tents. With the patent given to John Farlyon in 1534 as Yeoman of the Revels, what may be considered as an independent office of the Revels (within the general sphere of the Lord Chamberlain) came into being. When Sir Thomas Cawarden received a 1544 patent as Master of the Revels and Tents he became the first to head an independent office. At this point the role of the Master of the Revels was focused on royal entertainment. One of the master's fundamental roles was to audition players and companies for performances before the monarch and court. The master was also charged with matters of public health and ensured that playing companies ceased performances during plague seasons, as well as religious matters, guaranteeing that theaters closed on Lent. Each Master of the Revels kept an official office book that served as a record of all business transactions; including purchases and preparations for each theatrical entertainment and after 1578 included fees taken after licensing plays for performance.

After the dissolution of the monasteries, priories became open spaces to house British royal household offices. Soon after Cawarden's appointment, the office and its stores were transferred to a dissolved Dominican monastery at Blackfriars. The office of the Revels had been previously housed at Warwick Inn in the city, the London Charterhouse, and then at the priory of St. John of Jerusalem in Clerkenwell, to which a return was made after Cawarden's death in 1559. Cawarden lived at Loseley Park, near Guildford, where his official papers were preserved. Sir Thomas Benger succeeded Cawarden, followed by Sir Thomas Blagrave (1573–79), and Edmund Tylney followed him (1579–1610). Under Tylney, the functions of Master of the Revels gradually became extended and the office acquired the legal power to censor and control playing across the entire country. This increase in theatrical control coincided with the appearance of permanent adult theatres in London. Every company and traveling troupe had to submit a play manuscript to the Office of the Revels. The master read the manuscript and sometimes even attended rehearsals. Once a play was approved, the master would sign the last page of the manuscript. The licensed manuscript attesting to the Master of the Revels' approval of a play was a treasured item for playing companies. When traveling and taking a play into the country troupes had to carry the licensed copy of the play manuscript. There was a licensing fee charged by the Office of the Revels for the approving of plays. Tylney charged seven shillings per play.

With the legal authority to censor came the power to punish dramatists, actors and companies that published or performed subversive material. The master had the authority to imprison, torture or even maim those associated with dissident or unapproved theatrical material. In 1640 William Beeston was imprisoned for supporting the performance of a play without the approval and censor of Sir Henry Herbert, the Master of the Revels.

At the height of the Master of the Revels’ power, the master had the licensing authority to approve and censor plays as well as any publication or printing of theatrical materials across the entire country. He also had the authority to issue royal patents for new playing companies and approve the erection of their playhouses. The master was able to collect fees not only from the approval of allowed books and plays, but also through annual allowances from playing companies for the continued approval of their playhouses.

Under Tylney, the functions of Master of the Revels gradually became extended to a general censorship of the stage. In 1624 the Office of the Revels was put directly in the hands of the Lord Chamberlain, thus leading to the Licensing Act 1737, when the role was taken over by the Examiner of the Stage, an official of the Lord Chamberlain. The function was abolished only in 1968. In addition, by the end of Tylney's tenure, the authority of the Revels Office (rather than the City of London) to license plays for performance within the city was clearly established. Tylney was succeeded by his relation by marriage, Sir George Buck. Buck was granted the reversion of the mastership in 1597, which led to much repining on the part of the dramatist John Lyly, who had expected to be appointed to the post. Sir John Astley followed Buck in the office, but he soon sold his right to license plays to his deputy, Henry Herbert, who became Master in 1641.

For the study of English Renaissance theatre, the accounts of the Revels Office provide one of the two crucial sources of reliable and specific information from the Tudor and Stuart eras (the other being the Register of the Stationers Company). Within the revels accounts scholars find facts, dates, and other data available nowhere else. A catalogue of the Folger Shakespeare Library collection based on the majority of surviving papers of Thomas Cawarden is available on-line. Other papers are available to study at the Public Record Office at Kew, or the Surrey Record Office.

With the outbreak of the English Civil War in 1642, stage plays were prohibited. Stage plays did not return to England until the Restoration in 1660.

== The Revels Office ==
In 1608, Edmund Tylney wrote a memorandum on the office that offers a vivid picture of its operation. He wrote that the office:

consisteth of a wardrobe and other several [i.e. separate] rooms for artificers to work in (viz. tailors, embroiderers, property makers, painters, wire-drawers and carpenters), together with a convenient place for the rehearsals and setting forth of plays and other shows ...

Tylney went on to note that the office also provided a house for the master and his family, and other residences for some of the office's personnel, if specified in the patents of their positions.

In the year of the Tylney document, the Revels Office had moved to the Whitefriars district outside the western city wall of London, though throughout its history it was located in several other places about the city, including the Blackfriars district.

According to Thomas Blount in his 1656 dictionary "Glossographia", the origin of the word "Revels" is the French word "reveiller", to wake from sleep. He goes on to define "Revels" as:

Sports of Dancing, Masking, Comedies, and such like, used formerly in the Kings House, the Inns of Court, or in the Houses of other great personages; And are so called, because they are most used by night, when otherwise men commonly sleep.

== Masters of the Revels ==
- Walter Halliday (1461–1483)
- Sir Thomas Cawarden (1544–1559)
- Sir Thomas Benger (1560–1572)
- Sir Thomas Blagrave (1573–1579)
- Sir Edmund Tylney (1579–1610)
- Sir George Buck (1610–1622)
- Sir John Astley (1622–1640)
- Sir Henry Herbert (1640–1673, de facto from 1623)
- Thomas Killigrew (1673–1677)
- Charles Killigrew (1677–1725)
- Francis Henry Fitzroy Lea, Esq. (1726–1730/1)
- Charles Lee, Esq. (1731-1744)
- Solomon Dayrolles, Esq. (1744–1786)
- John Charles Crowle, Esq. (1786-????)

== Master of the Revels (Ireland) ==
- John Ogilby (1637–) (first Irish Master of the Revels)
- Joseph Ashbury (1682–)
- Thomas Griffith (1721–1729)
- Edward Hopkins (1722–1736)

== See also ==
- Artists of the Tudor court
- Serjeant Painter
