= Down Ampney =

Village in Gloucestershire, England

Coordinates: 51°40′N 1°51′W

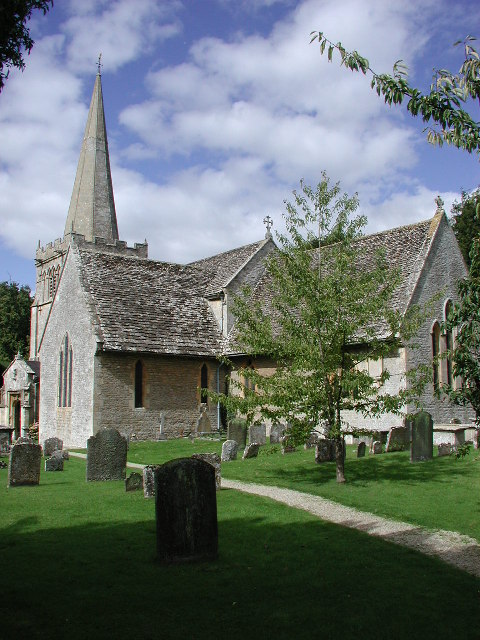
- All Saints Church, Down Ampney

- Location within Gloucestershire
- Population: 644 (2011 Census)
- District: Cotswold
- Shire county: Gloucestershire
- Region: South West
- Country: England
- Sovereign state: United Kingdom
- Post town: Cirencester
- Postcode district: GL7
- Police: Gloucestershire
- Fire: Gloucestershire
- Ambulance: South Western
- UK Parliament: South Cotswolds

Down Ampney (pronounced Amney) is a medium-sized village located in Cotswold district in Gloucestershire, in England. The population taken at the 2011 census was 644.

It is off the A417 which runs between Cirencester and Faringdon (in Oxfordshire) on the A420, and about 3 miles (4.8 km) north of Cricklade, which is on the A419 which runs from Cirencester to Swindon, Wiltshire.

== History ==
Down Ampney was notable in medieval times as one of the seats of the powerful Hungerford family, whose principal family seat was at Farleigh Hungerford, Somerset. The Down Ampney estate later passed from the Hungerford family to the Earls of St German (the Eliot Family).

=== Ralph Vaughan Williams ===
The Old Vicarage in Down Ampney was the birthplace in 1872 of composer Ralph Vaughan Williams, whose father, the Reverend Arthur Vaughan Williams (1834–1875), was vicar of All Saints. In 1906 the composer wrote a tune for the hymn "Come Down, O Love Divine" which he titled "Down Ampney" in honour of his birthplace.

=== RAF Down Ampney ===
During the Second World War, RAF Down Ampney airfield was a base for Dakota aircraft seeing active service in the war. The airfield played an important role in the Battle of Arnhem, 1944.

== Governance ==
Down Ampney has a Parish Council, currently with 7 members.

As of May 2015 the village became part of 'The Ampneys and Hampton Ward' on Cotswold District Council. The current District Councillor is Liberal Democrat Lisa Spivey who was elected in the 2019 United Kingdom local elections.

Ampney Crucis is part of the wider South Cerney electoral division for elections to Gloucestershire County Council, the current County Councillor is Conservative Shaun Parsons who was elected in the 2017 United Kingdom local elections.

== All Saints' Church ==
All Saints' Church is an ancient building that was founded by the Knights Hospitaller in 1265. It lies on the edge of the village; its peripheral location was brought about when the centre of the village shifted north due to the effects of the bubonic plague.

Its prominent spire dates from the 14th century, although much of the church fabric seen today is the product of Victorian restoration work carried out in 1863.

The church contains a number of elaborate monuments to the Hungerford family, including a 1637 Renaissance-style monument to Sir John and Sir Anthony Hungerford. Among the medieval memorials are two recumbent effigy tombs of Sir Nicholas de Valers (d.1300) and Lady Margaret de Valers (d.1320). The wooden fittings in the church, including the pulpit, reredos, and rood screen were designed in 1898 by Charles Ponting. Another screen in the north transept screen dates from 1900 and incorporating painted Jacobean panels displaying the coat of arms of Sir Anthony Hungerford. Today the church is a Grade I listed building. There is also a 20th-century stained-glass window in commemoration of 271 Sqn and the R.A.S.C who flew in the Dakota aircraft from the airfield for the Battle of Arnhem in 1944. The church holds an annual Arnhem Service in memory of the wartime operation. Another stained-glass is dedicated to the memory of Rev, Arthur Vaughan Williams who is buried in the churchyard.

The church featured in the 2017 Channel 4 television programme Penelope Keith's Hidden Villages.

== Amenities ==
In addition to the church and the airfield, the village has a school which is more than 150 years old, a multi-use games area for younger residents, a tennis club, a village hall and a small village shop.

The Down Ampney estate, comprising almost all of the farm land in the parish, is now owned by the Co-operative Group.

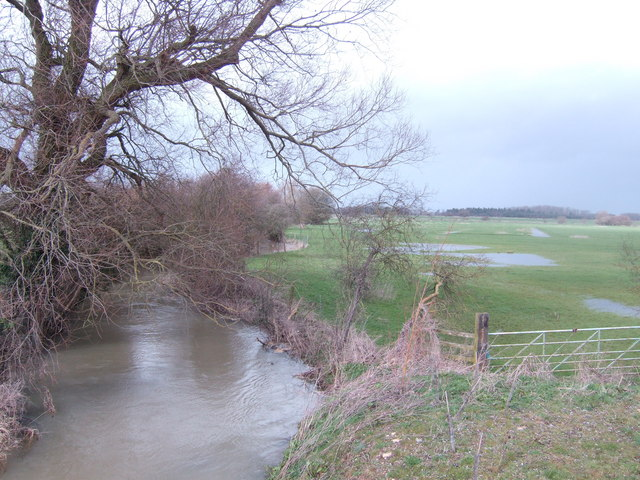
Ampney Brook

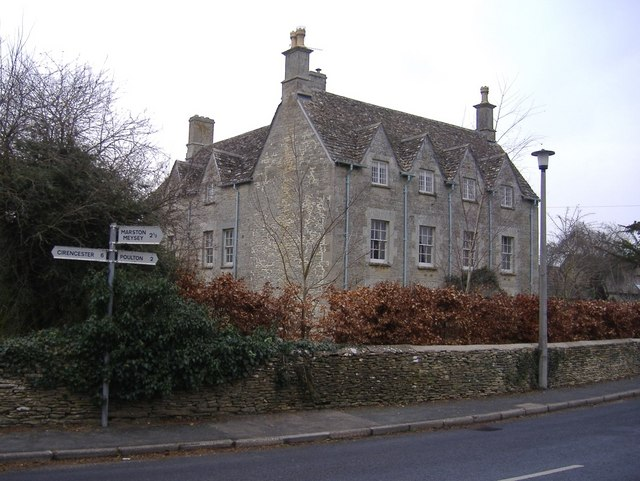
East House

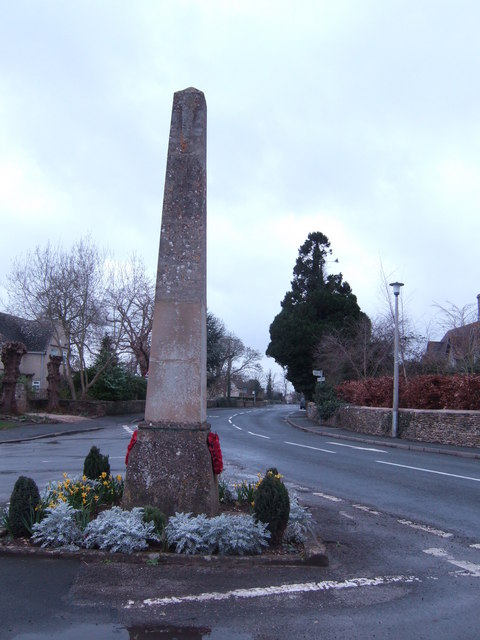
War memorial

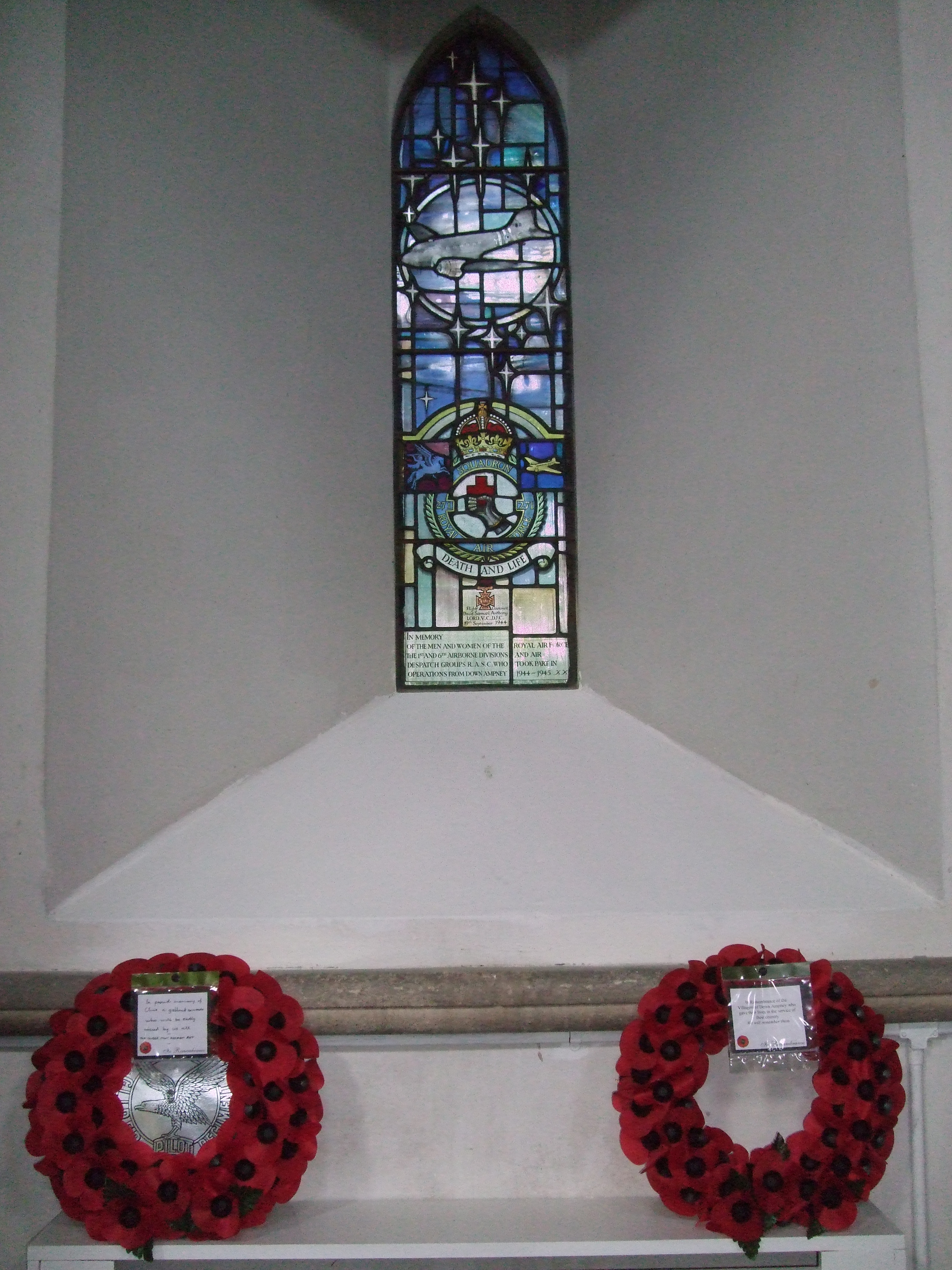
Arnhem memorial window, All Saints' Church

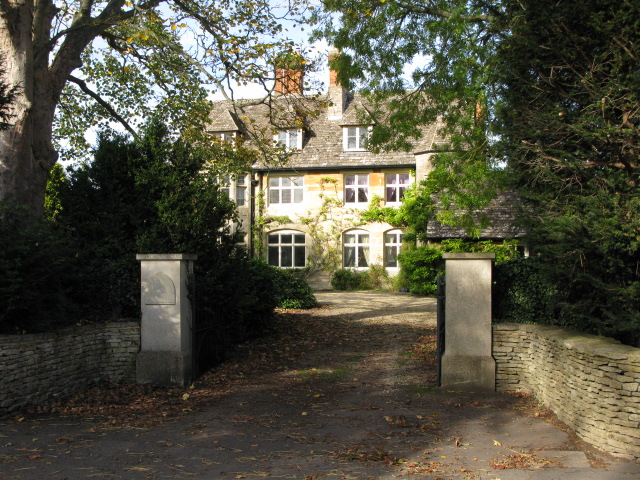
The Old Vicarage, birthplace of Ralph Vaughan Williams
