= Barn Church =

Barn Church may refer to:

- Barn church, architectural type of church

== United Kingdom ==
=== England ===
- The Barn Church, Kew, London
- Barn Chapel, Great Totham, Maldon, Essex
- The Barn, home of Bidford Baptist Church in Bidford-on-Avon, Warwickshire
- St Alban's, Cheam or Church of St Alban the Martyr, Cheam, London
- St Michael's Barn Church, Farley Green, Surrey

=== Scotland ===
- Barn Church, Culloden, Scotland

== United States ==
- The Barn Church, Dunlap, California
- Barn Church (Troy, Michigan)
- Old Barn Church; see Old Whaler's Church (Sag Harbor), New York
