= Baron Hamilton of Dalzell =

Title in the Peerage of the United Kingdom

Baron Hamilton of Dalzell, in the County of Lanark, is a title in the Peerage of the United Kingdom. It was created in 1886 (139 years ago) for the Liberal politician John Hamilton. He had previously represented Falkirk and Lanarkshire South in the House of Commons and after his elevation to the peerage served under William Ewart Gladstone as a Government Whip from 1892 to 1894. His eldest son, the second Baron, was a Government Whip from 1905 to 1911 in the Liberal administrations of Henry Campbell-Bannerman and H. H. Asquith and also served as Lord Lieutenant of Lanarkshire. His nephew, the third Baron, was Lord Lieutenant of Surrey. As of 2010 the title is held by the latter's grandson, the fifth Baron, who succeeded his father in 2006.

The territorial designation is pronounced /diːɛl/ as in the usual pronunciation of the Scottish surname. The ancient family seat, Dalzell House in Motherwell, Lanarkshire, was sold in 1952. The third Baron lived in Bramley, Surrey.

In 1980, James Hamilton, later to become the 4th Baron, inherited the Apley Hall estate of some 8,500 acres in Shropshire and the Betchworth estate in Surrey on the death of his cousin Major General E. H. Goulburn. The village hall at Betchworth is named the Hamilton Rooms after the family. As of 2004 the estate is divided into the land portion still owned by the current baron.

The Conservative politician Archie Hamilton, Baron Hamilton of Epsom (born 1941), is the second son of the third Baron Hamilton of Dalzell.

== Baron Hamilton of Dalzell (1886) ==
- John Glencairn Carter Hamilton, 1st Baron Hamilton of Dalzell (1829–1900)
- Gavin George Hamilton, 2nd Baron Hamilton of Dalzell (1872–1952)
- John d'Henin Hamilton, 3rd Baron Hamilton of Dalzell (1911–1990)
- James Leslie Hamilton, 4th Baron Hamilton of Dalzell (1938–2006)
- Gavin Goulburn Hamilton, 5th Baron Hamilton of Dalzell (born 1968)

The heir apparent is the present holder's son, the Hon. Francis Alexander James Goulburn Hamilton (born 2009).

=== Arms ===
Coat of arms of Baron Hamilton of Dalzell
Coronet A coronet of an Baron Crest An antelope proper, attired and hoofed or. Escutcheon Gules, an annulet or between three cinquefoils pierced ermine. Supporters Dexter: an antelope proper, ducally gorged and chained, the chain reflexed over the back or; Sinister: a wild man proper, wreathed about the temples and loins with laurel, and holding over the sinister shoulder a club or. Motto Quis Occursabit (Who will oppose)

=== Title succession chart ===
Title succession chart, Barons Hamilton of Dalzell

John Hamilton; 1st Baron Hamilton of Dalzell; 1829–1900
Archibald Hamilton; 1868–1870	Gavin Hamilton; 2nd Baron Hamilton of Dalzell; 1872–1952	Maj. Hon. Leslie Hamilton; 1873–1914
John Hamilton; 3rd Baron Hamilton of Dalzell; 1911–1990
James Hamilton; 4th Baron Hamilton of Dalzell; 1938–2006
Gavin Hamilton; 5th Baron Hamilton of Dalzell born 1968
Hon. Francis Hamilton born 2009
