= James Hamilton, 4th Baron Hamilton of Dalzell =

British Conservative Party hereditary peer

The Right Honourable The Lord Hamilton of Dalzell DL

Member of the House of Lords
- Lord Temporal
- as a hereditary peer 31 January 1990 – 11 November 1999
- Preceded by: The 3rd Baron Hamilton of Dalzell
- Succeeded by: Seat abolished (Note: Under the House of Lords Act 1999.)

Personal details
- Born: James Leslie Hamilton; 11 February 1938
- Died: 28 September 2006 (aged 68)
- Party: Conservative

James Leslie Hamilton, 4th Baron Hamilton of Dalzell, DL (11 February 1938 – 28 September 2006), was a British Conservative Party hereditary peer.

== Early life ==
Hamilton was the elder son (and second child) of John Hamilton, 3rd Baron Hamilton of Dalzell, a Lord-in-waiting to the Queen. The title was originally granted to Hamilton's great-grandfather, John Hamilton, 1st Baron Hamilton of Dalzell, who was a Liberal politician, and had been inherited by his second son, Gavin Hamilton, 2nd Baron Hamilton of Dalzell, also a Liberal politician, before passing his nephew, Hamilton's father. His mother, Rosemary Coke, was a daughter of Major Sir John Spencer Coke, son of Thomas Coke, 2nd Earl of Leicester; her maternal grandfather was Harry Lawson, 1st Viscount Burnham. His younger brother, Archie Hamilton, a former Armed Forces Minister, became a life peer in 2005, as Baron Hamilton of Epsom.

Hamilton followed his mother as a Christian Scientist, and attended Claremont Fan Court School and then Eton College. He did National Service in the Coldstream Guards from 1955 to 1958. His father had been wounded while serving with the same regiment in the Second World War. Hamilton then worked in the City of London as a gilts broker. He was a member of the London Stock Exchange from 1967 to 1980. He remained in the City for only a short period, leaving when he inherited two estates from his father's cousin. He married his wife, Corinna Dixon, in 1967, and they had four sons together. He succeeded his father as Baron Hamilton of Dalzell in 1990, inheriting land near and properties in the village of Betchworth in Surrey, and a Regency mansion.

== Political career ==
Hamilton made his maiden speech in the House of Lords in April 1992. He was an impassioned and tenacious debater, even if no one else shared his views. Although a Conservative, he opposed his party on many issues (his family's Latin motto was "Quis occursabit" - "Who will oppose?"). He was a strong Eurosceptic, opposing his party on issues relating to the Common Agricultural Policy and on the Maastricht Treaty. With three other peers, he presented a petition to the Queen in 2001 under clause 61 of Magna Carta, a provision that had not been invoked for more than 300 years, claiming that the Nice Treaty breached Magna Carta. Unusually, perhaps, he supported a written constitution, which he saw as a means to inhibit the gradual loss of power to Europe. He was a member of The Freedom Association, which published his Manifesto for Sovereign Britain in 2004.

He also objected to leasehold reform leading to the enfranchisement of leaseholders, and to family law reform. He strongly opposed reform of the House of Lords, to such an extent that he opposed the compromise that saw 92 hereditary peers retained in the reformed house. He refused to stand for one of the retained seats, and so was deprived of his seat after the passing of the House of Lords Act 1999.

He supported many charities, particularly Queen Elizabeth's Foundation for Disabled People for disabled people, of which he became a governor in 1978 and chairman in 1989, Rowton Houses, and The Henry Smith Charity. However, he argued against legislation to combat disability discrimination, believing that it was better to assist the disabled directly than impose obligations on businesses, since imposing those obligations would mean that the businesses were then unable to continue providing direct help.

He was appointed a Deputy Lieutenant of Surrey in 1993, and Lady Hamilton served as High Sheriff of Surrey for 1995.

== Later life ==
He inherited a passion for gardening from his father and had a notable garden at his home in Surrey. He was chairman of the National Council for the Conservation of Plants and Gardens (now Plant Heritage) from 1997 until his death. The database recording the 650 national plant collections run by the organisation was created under his chairmanship.

He died of cancer. He was survived by his wife, and the eldest of his four sons, Gavin, succeeded to the title.

== Arms ==
Coat of arms of James Hamilton, 4th Baron Hamilton of Dalzell
Coronet A coronet of an Baron Crest An antelope proper, attired and hoofed or. Escutcheon Gules, an annulet or between three cinquefoils pierced ermine. Supporters Dexter: an antelope proper, ducally gorged and chained, the chain reflexed over the back or; Sinister: a wild man proper, wreathed about the temples and loins with laurel, and holding over the sinister shoulder a club or. Motto Quis Occursabit (Who will oppose)

== Notes ==
Peerage of the United Kingdom
Preceded by John Hamilton	Baron Hamilton of Dalzell; 1990–2006; Member of the House of Lords (1990–1999)	Succeeded by Gavin Hamilton
