= Newbury Manor School =

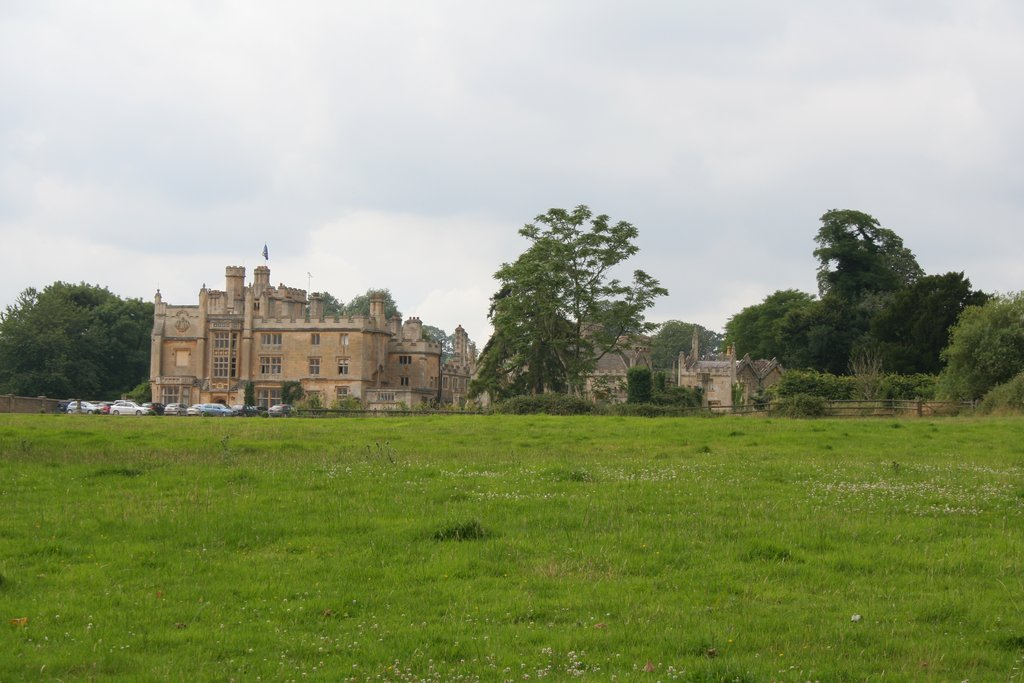
- The school's first home, at Farleigh Hungerford

Location
- Newbury Manor; Newbury; Frome, Somerset, BA11 3RG; England
- Coordinates: 51.2531°N 2.4321°W

Information
- Type: Private special school
- Department for Education URN: 131016 Tables
- Ofsted: Reports
- Gender: Coeducational
- Age: 7 to 19
- Enrolment: 41
- Website: www.aspriscs.co.uk/find-a-location/newbury-manor-school-frome

Newbury Manor School is a specialist education school for pupils with an autistic spectrum diagnosis, situated in Newbury, near Mells, seven miles from Frome, in the English county of Somerset.

The school is co-educational, approved by the Department for Education, and supports up to 65 students between the ages of six and 19. Newbury Manor School is run by Aspris Children’s Services.

== History ==
The school has its origins in Ravenscroft School, founded at Yelverton, Devon, in the 1930s and later moved to Beckington Castle and then to Farleigh House at Farleigh Hungerford, near Bath. This began as a prep school, but in the 1970s it found a new role as a special school specializing in teaching dyslexic children, and in 1996 it was re-organised as Farleigh College, a new institution which took over its staff, pupils, and premises. Farleigh College was launched in September 1996 with forty children, of whom thirty were dyslexic and ten had been diagnosed with Asperger's, and at the outset it had a five-year lease on Farleigh House.

The name of Farleigh College was kept after September 2000, when the school moved to Newbury House, near Mells, an 18th-century Grade II* listed country house. In 2013, the name of the secondary school was changed to Newbury Manor School, while the "Farleigh College" identity was kept for the later years.

== Farleigh Further Education College ==
Originally launched in September 2000 on the Farleigh House site to meet the needs of young people with Asperger's, a year later Farleigh Further Education College moved to Frome. It is still operated by the Priory Group as a Further Education College for students aged 16 to 19 (upon entry) with Asperger syndrome and associated disorders. This is registered with the Learning and Skills Council and is a full member of the National Association of Specialist Colleges of Further Education (NATSPEC). The main boarding house is North Parade; others are Tallowood, Maple, Ashleigh Grove, Sandusky Mews, Bridgwater and Delta Close. Students go to a mainstream college during the day, choosing their course during their enrolment before the start of year one. Most students go to Wiltshire College in Trowbridge, where there is a base room solely used by Farleigh Further Education College. Other college choices are Strode College and Bath College.

== See also ==
- Ravenscroft School
