= Ravenscroft School, Somerset =

Preparatory/special school in England

Ravenscroft School

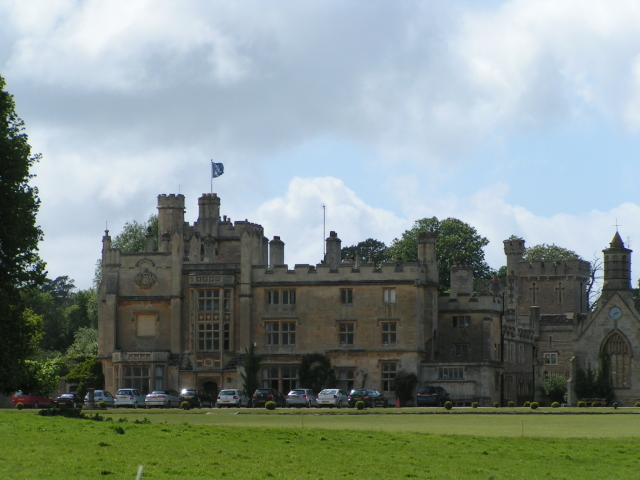
- Farleigh House

Location
- Beckington, later Farleigh Hungerford, Somerset; England; 51.3113°N 2.2917°W

Information
- Type: Preparatory/Special
- Motto: Audi et Aude (Learn and dare!)
- Established: 1930s
- Closed: 1996
- Gender: Boys, from 1964 co-educational
- Houses: Scots and Picts
- Colours: Black, brown and green

Ravenscroft School (founded 1931 at Yelverton, Devon, and until 1978 known as Ravenscroft Preparatory School) was an independent day and boarding school, initially for boys only, but from 1964 co-educational. From 1945 onwards its premises were in Somerset, England. It closed in July 1996, when most staff and pupils transferred to the new Farleigh College.

== History ==
Ravenscroft was founded by Henry F. Bailey as a preparatory school for boys at Yelverton, Devon, in 1931. In the course of its existence, it had at least three different homes.

Its first home was a house at Yelverton called Ravenscroft House, on the edge of Yelverton Common, with views over Dartmoor. This was previously known as 'Hayesleigh' and is now the Ravenscroft Care Home. In 1941, during the Second World War, a new but temporary Royal Air Force airfield called RAF Harrowbeer was constructed on part of Roborough Down close to Yelverton, and Ravenscroft House was requisitioned to become the officers' mess. The school closed at Yelverton, and Bailey left to teach temporarily at the Junior School section of Monkton Combe School from 1942 to 1944.

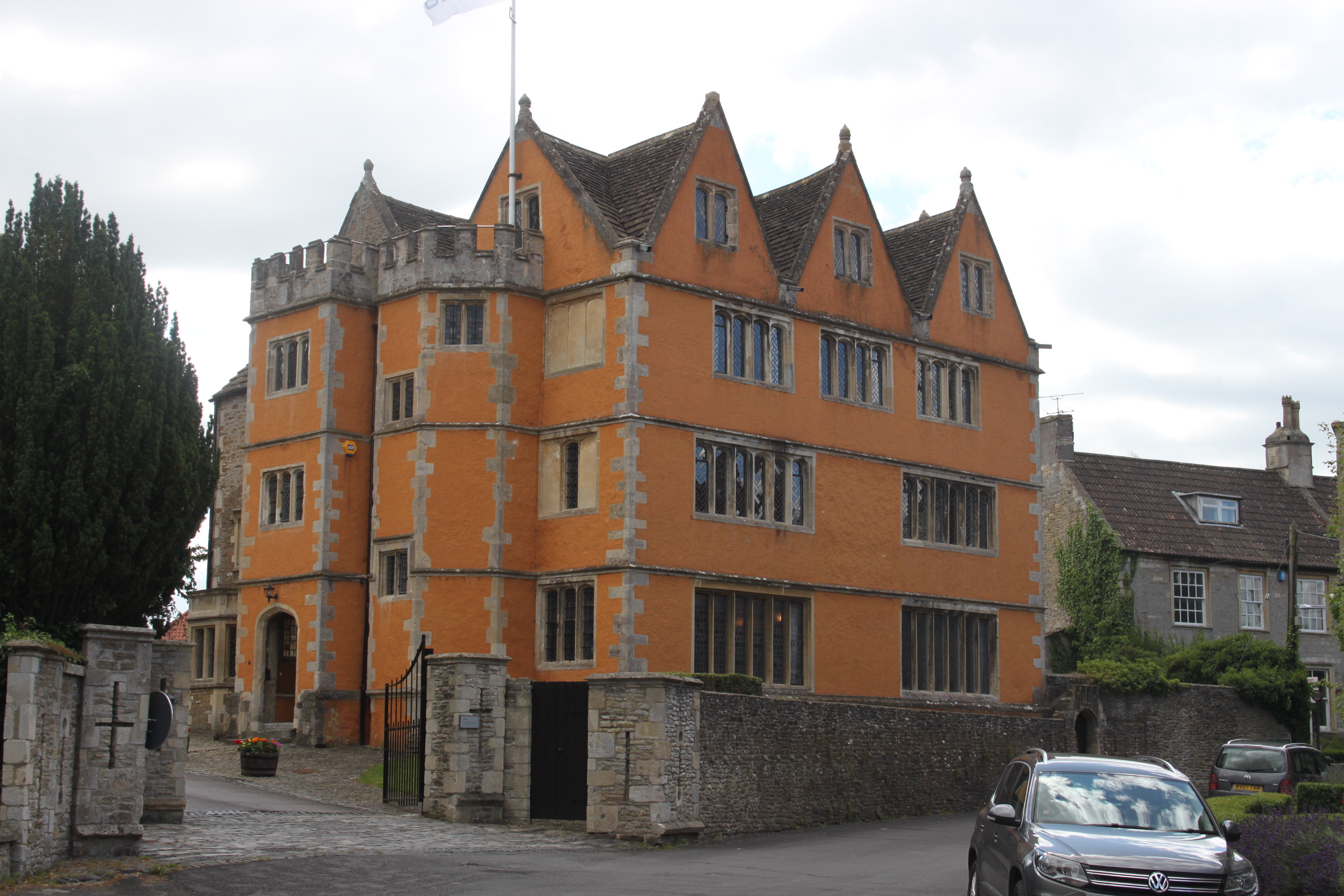
Beckington Castle pictured in 2015

In 1945, with his wife Mary, Bailey re-established his own school, at Beckington Castle in the village of Beckington, Somerset. This had previously been the home of Captain John Hamilton, Coldstream Guards, later 3rd Baron Hamilton of Dalzell, and it was the birthplace of his second son the politician Archie Hamilton, Baron Hamilton of Epsom. From 1951 to 1957, the deputy headmaster was the Rev. Edmund E. Bromwich, who was also Rector of Wanstrow.

About 1961, Bailey sold the school to Grantham Hill, and in January 1963 it was taken over by J. F. R. Gillam and his wife. By May of that year they had announced that they had opened a Kindergarten, as well as preparing older boys for the Common Entrance Examination.

In February 1966, a major fire began in the Castle's boiler room and parts of the interior were destroyed. The school closed for a week, then continued to operate in its outbuildings while the extensive damage was made good.

An old boy, Olympic rower Hugh Wardell-Yerburgh, visited the school in 1968, and Edward Henderson, Bishop of Bath and Wells, spoke warmly of it as guest speaker at its prize day in June of that year.

In 1970, growing numbers of pupils led to a move to a larger country house called Farleigh House, near the village of Farleigh Hungerford. It had previously been owned by Earl Cairns and members of the Hely-Hutchinson family, a branch of the Earls of Donoughmore.

In the late 1960s, while still at Beckington, the school had established a specialist unit which taught children who were dyslexic, and during the 1970s this unit increased in size until by 1980 the school was reclassified as a special school for children with dyslexia and other learning difficulties.

During the 1980s, the age range of children taught changed. As a preparatory school, the range had been from five to thirteen, at which point children proceeded to secondary schools. As a special school, 'O' Level courses (later GCSE) were introduced, and children stayed at Ravenscroft until the age of sixteen or seventeen.

By the year 1995, the school's age range was from eleven to seventeen. The number of pupils was then 66, of whom 11 were girls, and expenditure per pupil was £21,609, with a pupil:teacher ratio of 3.4 to one. All children were boarders, and lived either at the main school or at Houlton Hall, or two houses owned by the school in the neighbouring town of Trowbridge. There was a Duke of Edinburgh Award scheme, and some pupils attended courses at Trowbridge College.

In July 1996, Ravenscroft School was closed, and most of its pupils and staff transferred to a new educational institution on the same site called Farleigh College. In September 2000, this moved to Newbury House near Mells, Somerset, and for the next year the Farleigh Hungerford site was operated as the "Farleigh Further Education College", which continued the education of some of the older students at Farleigh House until a five-year lease on it expired in September 2001. This further education college, Newbury Manor School, then moved to Frome where it specialises in the support and education of up to 35 young people aged 7 to 19 years who have an autistic spectrum diagnosis and complex needs, with on-site residential care for up to eight students.

== Heads of Ravenscroft ==
=== Headmasters ===
- 1931–1960: Henry F. Bailey
- 1960–1962: B. W. Grantham-Hill
- 1963–1988: J. F. R. Gillam, M.A. (Dublin) (previously a master at Hawtreys)

=== Head Teachers ===
- 1988–1994: Anne-Marie Gillam, M.A., BEd
- 1994–1996: S. Bradshaw, BEd

== School Badge ==
The badge (which until the 1970s was worn on the school's blazers and caps) was a black raven facing to the left.

== School Motto ==
The Latin motto 'Audi et aude' means 'Learn and dare'.

== Notable former pupils ==
Notable Ravenscroft students, known as Old Ravens include:

- Guy Hands, financier and investor
- Christopher Newbury, Council of Europe
- Hugh Wardell-Yerburgh, Olympic rower
