= Dalzell House =

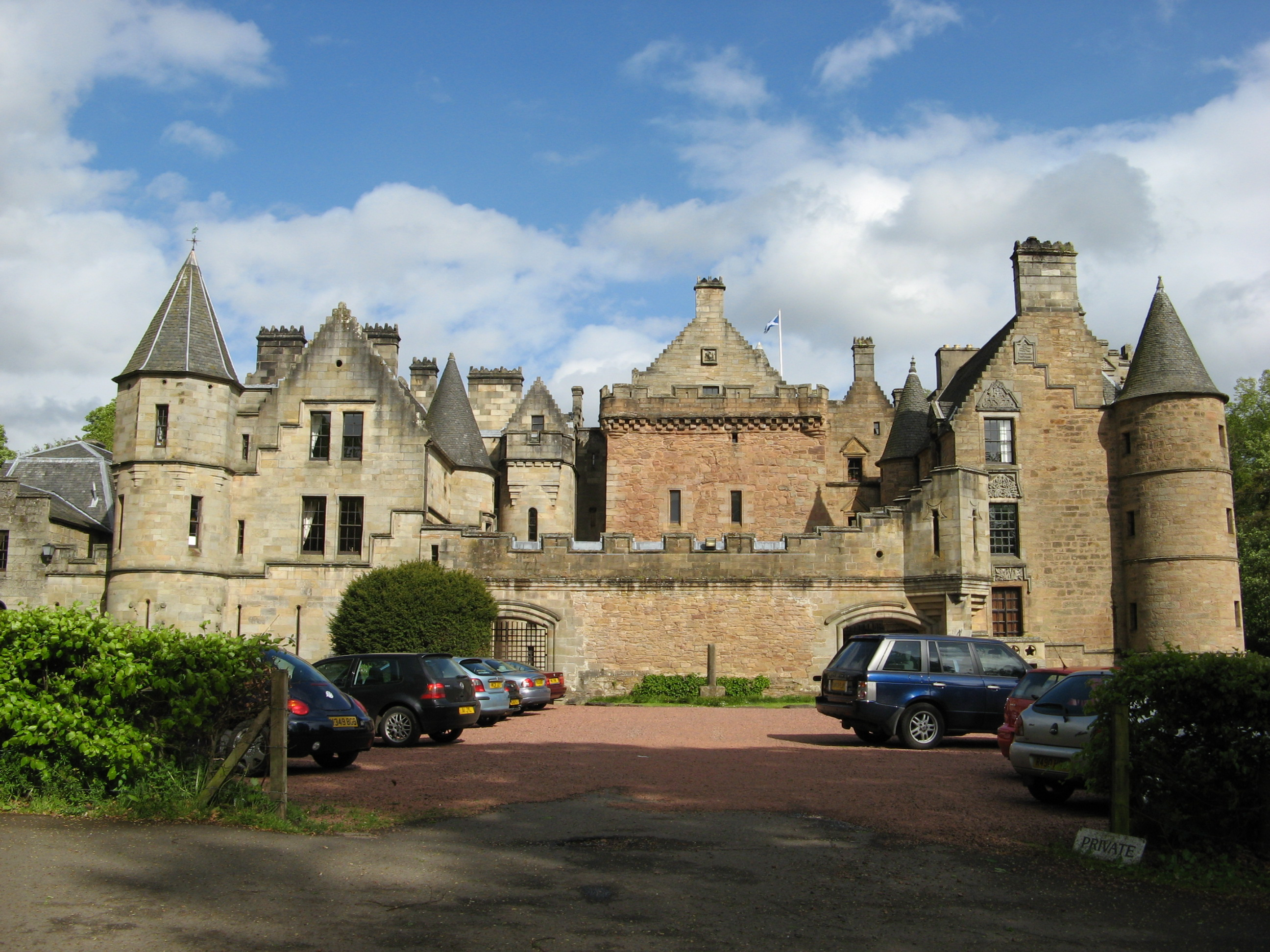
- Dalzell House: the tower house is in the centre, with the 17th-century south range on the right, and the 19th-century north range on the left

- Location within North Lanarkshire
- 55.7725°N 3.978056°W
- Location: Motherwell, North Lanarkshire, Scotland

History
- Built: c. 15th century c. 1649; 1857–1859
- Built for: Dalzell family James Hamilton of Boggs; John Hamilton, 1st Baron Hamilton of Dalzell

Site notes
- Architect: R. W. Billings
- Restored: late 1980s
- Restored by: Classical House

Listed Building – Category A
- Designated: 28 January 1971
- Reference no.: LB38238

Inventory of Gardens and Designed Landscapes in Scotland
- Official name: Dalzell House
- Designated: 1 July 1987
- Reference no.: GDL00132

Dalzell House (/diˈɛl/ dee-EL) is a historic house in Motherwell, North Lanarkshire, Scotland. It is located to the south of the town, on the north bank of the River Clyde. At its core is a 15th-century tower house, with extensive additions built during the 17th and 19th centuries. In the 1980s the house was restored and divided for sale as eighteen private apartments, while the surrounding Dalzell estate is now owned by North Lanarkshire Council. The house is protected as a Category A listed building, and the grounds are listed on the Inventory of Gardens and Designed Landscapes in Scotland.

== History ==
The 15th- or early 16th-century tower house was built by the Dalzell family, who acquired these lands in the 13th century. Thomas de Dalzell fought at the Battle of Bannockburn in 1314. Sir Robert Dalzell forfeited the lands around 1342, for residing in England without the King's consent, but they were restored through marriage in the 15th century. Another Sir Robert Dalzell was created Lord Dalzell in 1628, and his son was further elevated as Earl of Carnwath in 1639.

In 1645 the Earl of Carnwath granted the Dalzell estate to his nephew James Hamilton of Boggs, who built the first major extensions to the tower house, adding the south wing around 1649. By 1750, avenues of trees had been laid out in the grounds, probably the work of Archibald Hamilton, 4th of Dalzell. The 7th Hamilton laird, another Archibald Hamilton, entered a venture with the reformer Robert Owen. An attempt was made to build a model settlement at the Hamiltons' nearby property of Orbiston, but this proved an expensive failure.

In the 19th century, the family's fortunes were enhanced by the Lanarkshire coal mining boom, and in the 1850s John Hamilton (1829–1900), a Liberal politician later ennobled as Baron Hamilton of Dalzell, commissioned a major remodelling of the house. Architect Robert William Billings carried out extensive restorations to the earlier buildings, and added a new north wing. Billings had recently published The Baronial and Ecclesiastical Antiquities of Scotland (1852), four volumes of engravings of Scottish architecture, and he drew heavily on this source material in his work at Dalzell. He lived at Dalzell for three years while overseeing the works. Andrew Cassels, a local man, undertook work on the gardens and grounds, possibly supervised by Billings. The south wing was also restored in 1869, following a fire. Lord Hamilton served in the government of William Gladstone, who visited Dalzell on several occasions, and the Prince and Princess of Wales visited in 1888.

On the death of the 2nd Baron in 1952, the property was sold out of the Hamilton family. Part of it was used as Gresham House Boys' Boarding school from 1954 until 1967, when it was purchased by Motherwell and Wishaw Town Council. The house then stood empty until the 1980s when developer Classical House renovated the property as a series of 18 private apartments. The interiors retain Billings' Jacobean detailing.

== See also ==
- List of Category A listed buildings in North Lanarkshire
- List of listed buildings in Motherwell And Wishaw, North Lanarkshire
