= John Hamilton, 3rd Baron Hamilton of Dalzell =

British peer and courtier (1911–1990)

The Right Honourable The Lord Hamilton of Dalzell GCVO MC

Member of the House of Lords
- Lord Temporal
- In office 23 June 1952 – 31 January 1990
- Preceded by: The 2nd Baron Hamilton of Dalzell
- Succeeded by: The 4th Baron Hamilton of Dalzell

Personal details
- Born: John d'Henin Hamilton; 1 May 1911
- Died: 31 January 1990 (aged 78)

John d'Henin Hamilton, 3rd Baron Hamilton of Dalzell (1 May 1911 – 31 January 1990), was a British peer and courtier. He served with the Coldstream Guards during the Second World War, and after succeeding his uncle in the peerage in 1952, became a Lord-in-Waiting and Lord Lieutenant of Surrey.

== Early life and education ==
Hamilton was the only son of Major Leslie d'Henin Hamilton and his wife Amy Ricardo. Major Hamilton was a younger son of John Hamilton, 1st Baron Hamilton of Dalzell. He was educated at Eton College and the Royal Military College, Sandhurst.

== Military career ==
Hamilton was commissioned into the Coldstream Guards as a second lieutenant on 29 January 1931. He was promoted to lieutenant on 29 January 1934. On 12 September 1937, he became a lieutenant in the Coldstream Guards reserve of officers.

During the Second World War, Hamilton saw active service with his regiment's 5th Battalion, which formed part of the Guards Armoured Division, in the Battle of Normandy, and was injured there on 18 July 1944. Hamilton was awarded the Military Cross on 30 June 1945 "in recognition of gallant and distinguished services in North West Europe". He was promoted to a substantive captaincy in the reserve of the Coldstream Guards on 1 January 1949.

== Later life ==
After the end of the war, he sold his house at Beckington to H. F. Bailey, who re-established Ravenscroft School there, and moved to Snowdenham House, Bramley, near Guildford. Hamilton succeeded his uncle, Gavin Hamilton, 2nd Baron Hamilton of Dalzell, in his peerage in 1952. He was appointed a deputy lieutenant of Surrey on 16 October 1957.

In the 1960s, Hamilton was President of the National Association of Probation Officers. In 1961, he was with Queen Elizabeth II at Kingston on Thames as Vice Lord Lieutenant for Surrey. Lord Hamilton was appointed a Lord-in-Waiting on 17 September 1968. In 1973, he was appointed Lord Lieutenant of Surrey. Hamilton retired as a Lord-in-Waiting on 1 July 1981, and was made a Knight Commander of the Royal Victorian Order (KCVO) the following day. He retired from the Lord-Lieutenancy in 1986, and was promoted to Knight Grand Cross of the Royal Victorian Order (GCVO) in the 1987 New Year Honours.

== Personal life ==
In 1935 he married Rosemary Coke and acquired Beckington Castle, Somerset. Their children included James Leslie Hamilton (1938–2006), later the fourth Baron, and Archibald Gavin ("Archie"), born at Beckington in 1941, later a Conservative politician and life peer.

Lady Hamilton's sister Celia was the grandmother of Jack Brooksbank, who married the Queen's granddaughter Princess Eugenie in 2018.

== Arms ==
Coat of arms of John Hamilton, 3rd Baron Hamilton of Dalzell
| Coronet A coronet of an Baron Crest An antelope proper, attired and hoofed or. Escutcheon Gules, an annulet or between three cinquefoils pierced ermine. Supporters Dexter: an antelope proper, ducally gorged and chained, the chain reflexed over the back or; Sinister: a wild man proper, wreathed about the temples and loins with laurel, and holding over the sinister shoulder a club or. Motto Quis Occursabit (Who will oppose) |

Honorary titles
| Preceded by The Earl of Munster | Lord-Lieutenant of Surrey; 1973–1986 | Succeeded by Richard Thornton |
Peerage of the United Kingdom
| Preceded by Gavin Hamilton | Baron Hamilton of Dalzell; 1952–1990; Member of the House of Lords (1952–1990) | Succeeded by James Hamilton |
