= Farleigh House =

Country house in Farleigh Hungerford, Somerset, England

Coordinates: 51.31715°N 2.28836°W

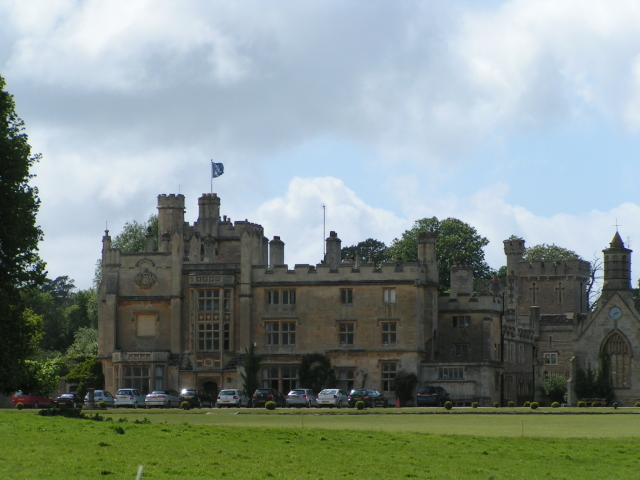
- Interactive map of the Farleigh House area

General information
- Architectural style: Gothic Revival
- Location: Farleigh Hungerford, England
- Completed: 1820
- Cost: £40,000
- Client: Joseph Houlton

Farleigh House, or Farleigh Castle, sometimes called Farleigh New Castle, is a large English country house in the county of Somerset, formerly the centre of the Farleigh Hungerford estate. Much of the stone to build it came from the nearby Farleigh Hungerford Castle and the house is now a Grade II listed building.

Farleigh House was built and extended during the 18th and 19th centuries and until 1970 served as the centre of a country estate owned by the Houlton family until 1899, then by others. In 1970 it was sold to be used as a prep school called Ravenscroft School. After this closed in 1996, the house was leased from the last owners of the school by the new Farleigh College until 2001, and it was then sold to Inspecs, a manufacturer of optical instruments. In 2010 a 99-year lease was acquired by Bath Rugby Club, which now occupies it as its headquarters and training centre.

== Houlton family ==
The house was largely built with stone taken from the ruins of the medieval Farleigh Castle. A Trowbridge clothier, Joseph Houlton, bought the Farleigh Hungerford estate in 1702, and his son, Joseph Houlton the Younger, lived at Church Farm on the estate. He completely rebuilt and turned an old gabled house into Farleigh House, a modest gentleman's residence complete with a 120-acre (49 ha) deer park. In 1806, Colonel John Houlton inherited the estate. He enlarged and altered the house in the fashionable Gothic Revival style, spending £40,000 - several million in today's values — on extensions to the main house, a chapel, hot houses, conservatories, stables and six lodges. Most of the present house dates from that period. One of the lodges was called the Castle Lodge and was known as the Bath Lodge Castle Hotel until its closure in June 2022.

The Houlton family remained at Farleigh Hungerford until 1899, when Sir Edward Houlton died with no male heir.

== Later owners ==
The estate was sold in 1906 to Lord Cairns and later passed through several hands. In the 1950s and 1960s, Farleigh House and its estate were owned by the Hely-Hutchinson family, a cadet branch of the Earls of Donoughmore.

== Ravenscroft School ==
In 1970, the main house and a number of cottages were sold to Mr John F. R. Gillam, the Headmaster and owner of Ravenscroft School, which had previously been based in nearby Beckington Castle. In about 1980, John Gillam also bought much of the Farleigh Hungerford estate. In July 1996, Ravenscroft School was closed and the house was leased to Farleigh College, a Special Needs school educating children with autism spectrum disorders and dyslexia, but which subsequently moved to new premises near Mells. The Gillam family continued to own the house until 2002, when it was sold to an optical company called Inspecs to serve as the firm's headquarters.

== Inspecs ==
In 2002, the London-based company Inspecs, owned by Robin Totterman and Chris Smith, purchased the house and grounds and reinstated the old name of 'Farleigh House'. They spent eight years and significant amounts of money bringing the house back to its former glory. A complete refurbishment was carried out during this time, including the replacement of most of the flat lead roof. A medieval fortified tower to the west of Farleigh House, known as 'Drakes' and now called the Tower House or Castle Court, was saved from ruin through an extensive restoration project. Estate Manager David Reed (the brother of actor Oliver Reed) also carried out significant groundworks to reinstate the traditional formal gardens.

== Bath Rugby Club ==
In April 2010, it was announced that Bruce Craig, a local businessman, had bought a 99-year lease of Farleigh House to use it as Bath Rugby Club's new administrative headquarters and training ground, following his acquisition of the Club. The house is now Bath Rugby's training centre. The property now has two rugby pitches as well as an all weather playing surface.
