= Church of St Leonard, Farleigh Hungerford =

Church in Somerset, England

Church of St Leonard
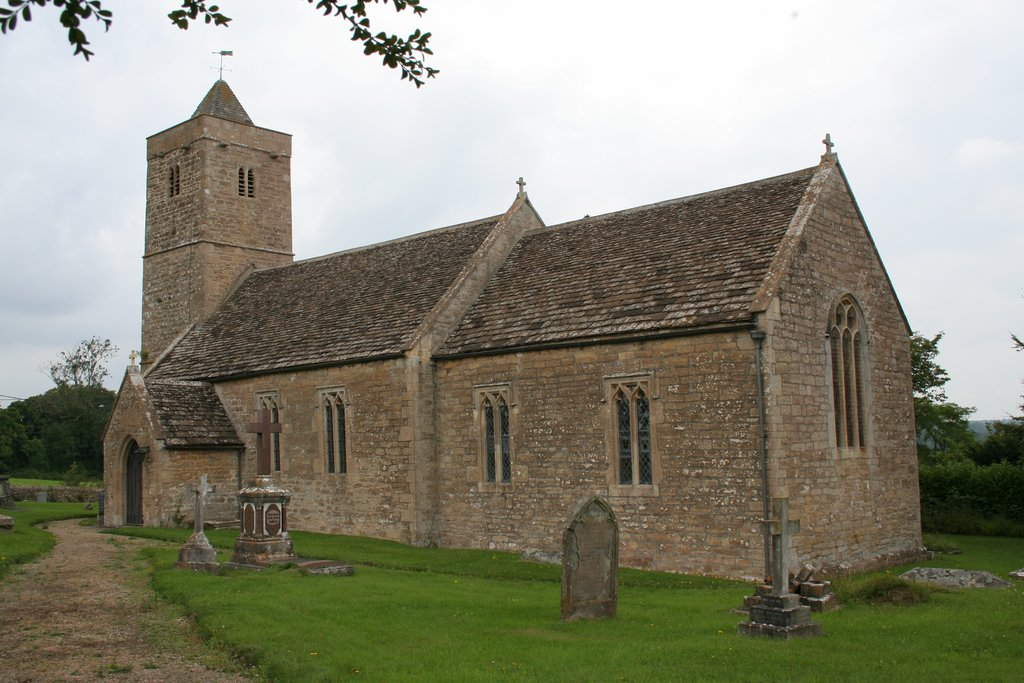

- Location within Somerset
- 51°18′56″N 2°17′18″W
- Location: Farleigh Hungerford, Somerset, England

History
- Built: 1443

Listed Building – Grade II*
- Designated: 11 March 1968
- Reference no.: 1174661

The Anglican Church of St Leonard in Farleigh Hungerford, within the English county of Somerset, was consecrated in 1443. It is a Grade II* listed building.

It was once within the outer walls of Farleigh Hungerford Castle but is now separated from it by the main road. Thomas Hungerford did not want the local peasants entering the chapel within the castle, and wanted to use it as his chantry, and as a result organised the construction of the new church.

The church has a perpendicular style West Tower in three stages, with a pair of stone gargoyles on each face. There are the remains of some 14th-century stained glass in the north window of the nave and in the east Chancel window which are of Flemish origin. The church also contains a 17th-century wooden altar rail carved with open work scrolls and figures. The pulpit dates from the early 18th century and is carved with eagles and angels.

The church underwent Victorian restoration in 1856.

The parish is part of the benefice of Hardington Vale within the Diocese of Bath and Wells.
