= Archie Hamilton =

British politician

The Right Honourable The Lord Hamilton of Epsom PC
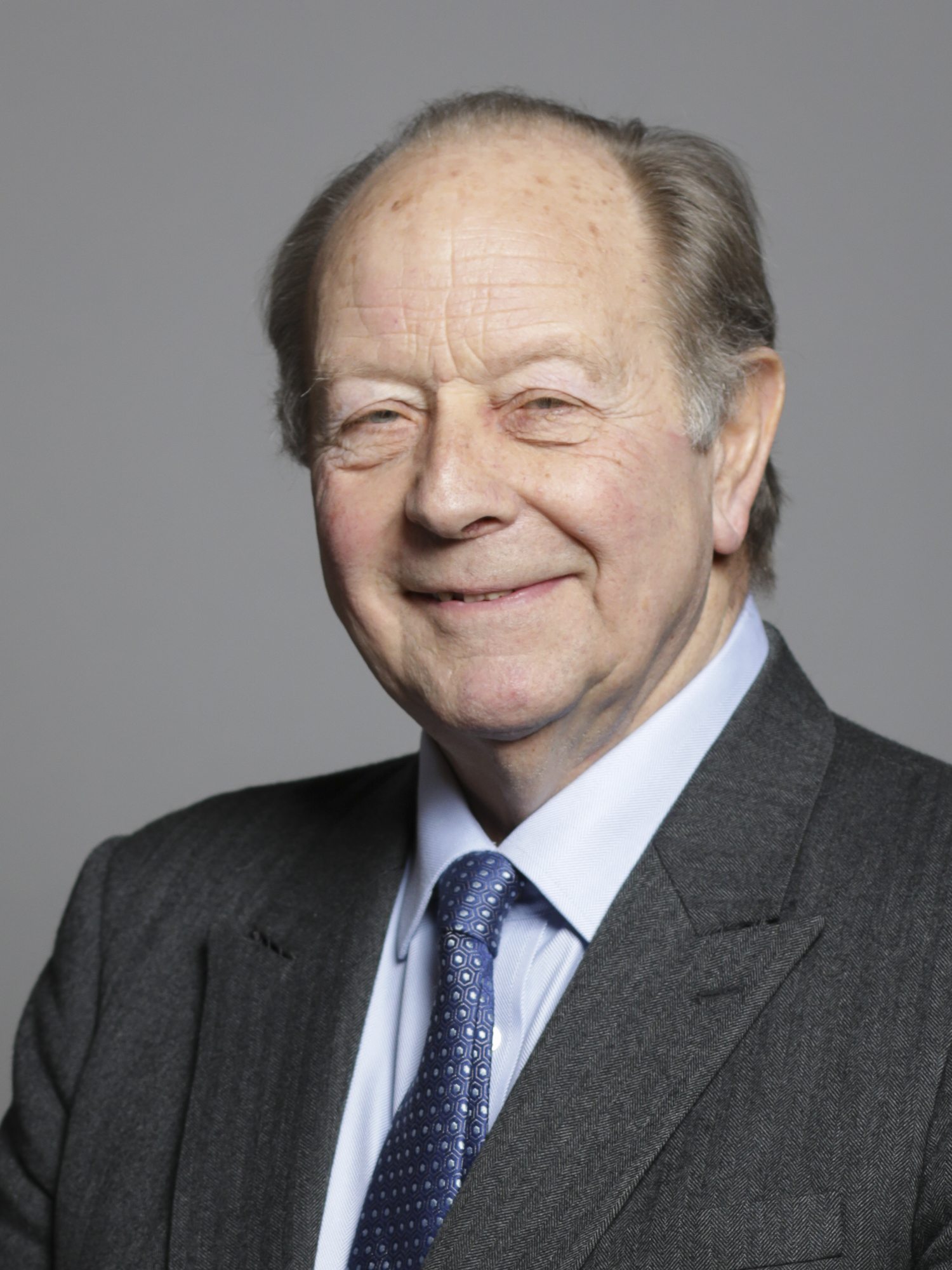
- Official portrait, 2020

Minister of State for the Armed Forces
- In office 25 July 1988 – 27 May 1993
- Prime Minister: Margaret Thatcher; John Major
- Preceded by: Ian Stewart
- Succeeded by: Jeremy Hanley

Member of Parliament for Epsom and Ewell
- In office 27 April 1978 – 14 May 2001
- Preceded by: Peter Rawlinson
- Succeeded by: Chris Grayling

Member of the House of Lords
- Lord Temporal
- Life peerage 17 June 2005

Personal details
- Born: 30 December 1941 (age 84)
- Party: Conservative
- Portfolio: Trustee of Supporting Wounded Veterans, President of the Lest We Forget Association

Archibald Gavin Hamilton, Baron Hamilton of Epsom, PC (born 30 December 1941) is a British Conservative Party politician. A member of the House of Lords, he served as Minister of State for the Armed Forces under John Major.

== Background and education ==
Hamilton is the second son of the 3rd Baron Hamilton of Dalzell, a Lord-in-waiting to Elizabeth II. The title was created for Hamilton's great-grandfather, John Hamilton, 1st Baron Hamilton of Dalzell, who was a Liberal politician, and was inherited by his second son, Gavin Hamilton, 2nd Baron Hamilton of Dalzell, also a Liberal politician, before passing to his nephew, Hamilton's father. His mother, Rosemary Coke, was a daughter of Major Sir John Spencer Coke, son of Thomas Coke, 2nd Earl of Leicester; her maternal grandfather was Harry Lawson, 1st Viscount Burnham. Hamilton is the younger brother of the 4th Baron Hamilton of Dalzell, and was born at Beckington Castle, Beckington, Somerset, which was then his parents' country house. He was educated at Eton College.

== Political career ==
Hamilton was a Conservative councillor in Kensington and Chelsea from 1968 to 1971. He initially attempted to enter Parliament for Dagenham at the February and October 1974 elections, but was defeated by Labour's veteran incumbent, John Parker. He won the seat of Epsom and Ewell at a 1978 by-election. He held it until his retirement from Parliament in 2001.

During his parliamentary career, Hamilton served as Parliamentary Private Secretary (PPS) to the Secretary of State for Energy (1979–81) and Transport (1981–82). From 1982 to 1984, he was Assistant Conservative Whip. In 1984 he became Lord Commissioner to HM Treasury, a position he held until 1986. From 1986 to 1987, Hamilton was Parliamentary Under-Secretary of State at the Ministry of Defence.

Hamilton served as PPS to Prime Minister Margaret Thatcher (1987–88), Minister of State, Ministry of Defence (Armed Forces Minister, 1988–93) and was created a Privy Councillor in 1991. He was Chairman of the 1922 Committee from 1997 to 2001. Whilst an MP, he sat on the Standards and Privileges Committee (regarding Ethics of the Lords and Commons) in 1996. From 1994 to 1997, he also served on the Intelligence and Security Committee.

Hamilton was knighted in 1994. On 13 May 2005 it was announced that he would be created a life peer, and the peerage was gazetted on 17 June 2005 as Baron Hamilton of Epsom, of West Anstey in the County of Devon. Since 2015, he has sat on the Joint Committee for the National Security Strategy. In March 2025, Hamilton made remarks during a House of Lords debate on the Holocaust Memorial and Learning Centre Bill, which drew criticism; he later withdrew the comments and apologised.

== Personal life ==
Hamilton is a bridge player. He is a member of the Lords bridge team and the All Party Parliamentary Bridge Group. In 1968, he married Anne Catherine Napier (born 1940), daughter of the late Commander Trevylyan Michael Napier DSC, RN. (1901–30 August 1940) and poet and author Priscilla Hayter (1908–98), who produced books about Napier ancestors, poetry and an autobiography, A Late Beginner. Anne is a sculptor and painter. The couple have three daughters and several grandchildren. In 2006, their youngest daughter Alice Rose Alethea Hamilton married Dominic Johnson, financier, hedge fund manager, and government minister. Hamilton sits in the House of Lords, and is a trustee of Supporting Wounded Veterans, as well as being the president of the Lest We Forget Association.

== Arms ==
Coat of arms of Archie Hamilton
Coronet Coronet of a baron Crest An antelope Proper armed and unguled Or. Escutcheon Gules an annulet Or between three cinquefoils Ermine pierced of the field a bordure of the second. Supporters Dexter a wildman Proper wreathed about the head and waist with laurel Proper and holding over the dexter shoulder a club Or sinister an antelope as matriculated in June 2008 in Scotland Proper armed unguled and gorged with a coronet attached thereto a chain reflexed over the back Or. Motto Modo Ludos

Parliament of the United Kingdom
Preceded by Peter Rawlinson	Member of Parliament for Epsom and Ewell; 1978–2001	Succeeded by Chris Grayling
Government offices
Preceded by Michael Alison	Parliamentary Private Secretary to the Prime Minister; 1987–1988	Succeeded by Mark Lennox-Boyd
Political offices
Preceded by John Lee	Parliamentary Under-Secretary of State for Defence Procurement; 1986–1987	Succeeded by Tim Sainsbury
Preceded by Ian Stewart	Minister of State for the Armed Forces; 1988–1993	Succeeded by Jeremy Hanley
Preceded by Marcus Fox	Chairman of the 1922 Committee; 1997–2001	Succeeded by Michael Spicer
Orders of precedence in the United Kingdom
Preceded by The Lord Foulkes of Cumnock	Gentlemen; Baron Hamilton of Epsom	Followed by The Lord Jones of Cheltenham
