= Barn Church (Troy, Michigan) =

Church in Michigan

Coordinates: 42°34′50.9″N 83°08′52.4″W

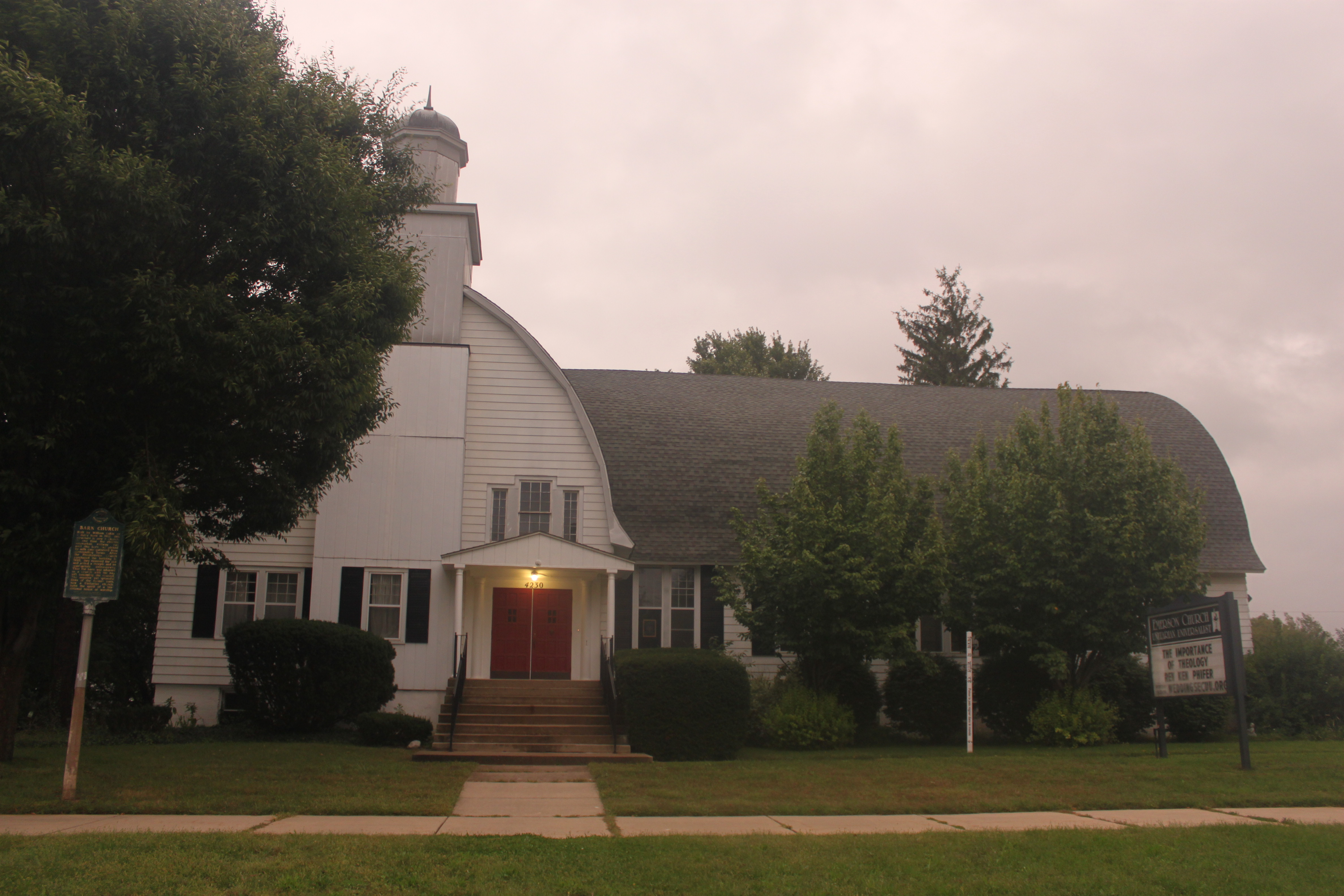
The church in September 2014

The Barn Church was built by William Lakie in Troy in Oakland County, Michigan in 1912 and was converted to a church when it stopped being used for its original function as a dairy barn. It is now a Michigan State Historic Site.

Prior to its purchase by the Presbyterian Church in 1928, electric interurban cars would stop at the barn to pick up milk to take to market. The Presbyterians made some modifications to the barn to convert it for use as a house of worship. This included removing the silo, adding a steeple and a new entrance, and transforming the hay loft into the chancel.

In 1970 the church was sold by the Presbyterians to a growing Unitarian Universalist congregation from the nearby community of Clawson. Emerson Church Unitarian Universalist called the "Barn Church" home until 2015 when they, and the neighboring Paint Creek Unitarian Universalist church of Rochester, decided to merge to form Beacon Unitarian Universalist Congregation.

== See also ==
- Barn Church (disambiguation)
- First Methodist Episcopal Church of Pokagon
- Barn Church, Culloden, Scotland
- St Alban's Church, Cheam, London, England
- The Barn Church, Kew, London, England
- List of Michigan State Historic Sites
