= St Swithun's Church, Martyr Worthy =

Coordinates: 51.091993°N 1.265033°W

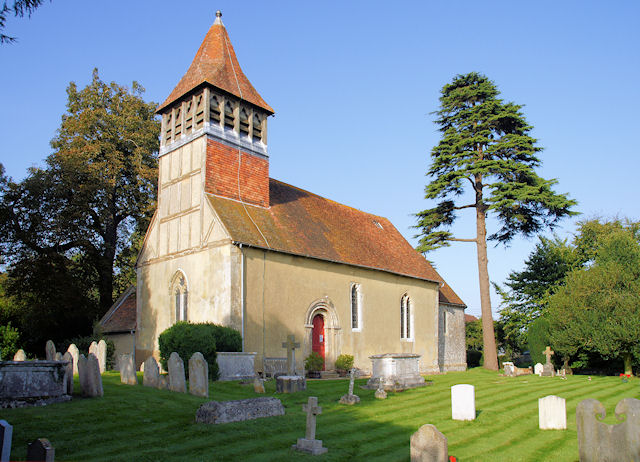
- St Swithun's Church, Martyr Worthy
- OS grid reference: SU 51568 32777
- Country: England
- Denomination: Church of England

Architecture
- Years built: 12th century

Administration
- Diocese: Winchester
- Deanery: Alresford

St Swithun's Church, Martyr Worthy is a Church of England parish church in Martyr Worthy, Hampshire, England.

The church, parts of which date from the 12th century, is a Grade II* listed building. The broach spire at The Barn Church in Kew, London is modelled on that of St Swithun's.
