= First Methodist Episcopal Church of Pokagon =

Historic church in Michigan, United States

- U.S. National Register of Historic Places
- Michigan State Historic Site
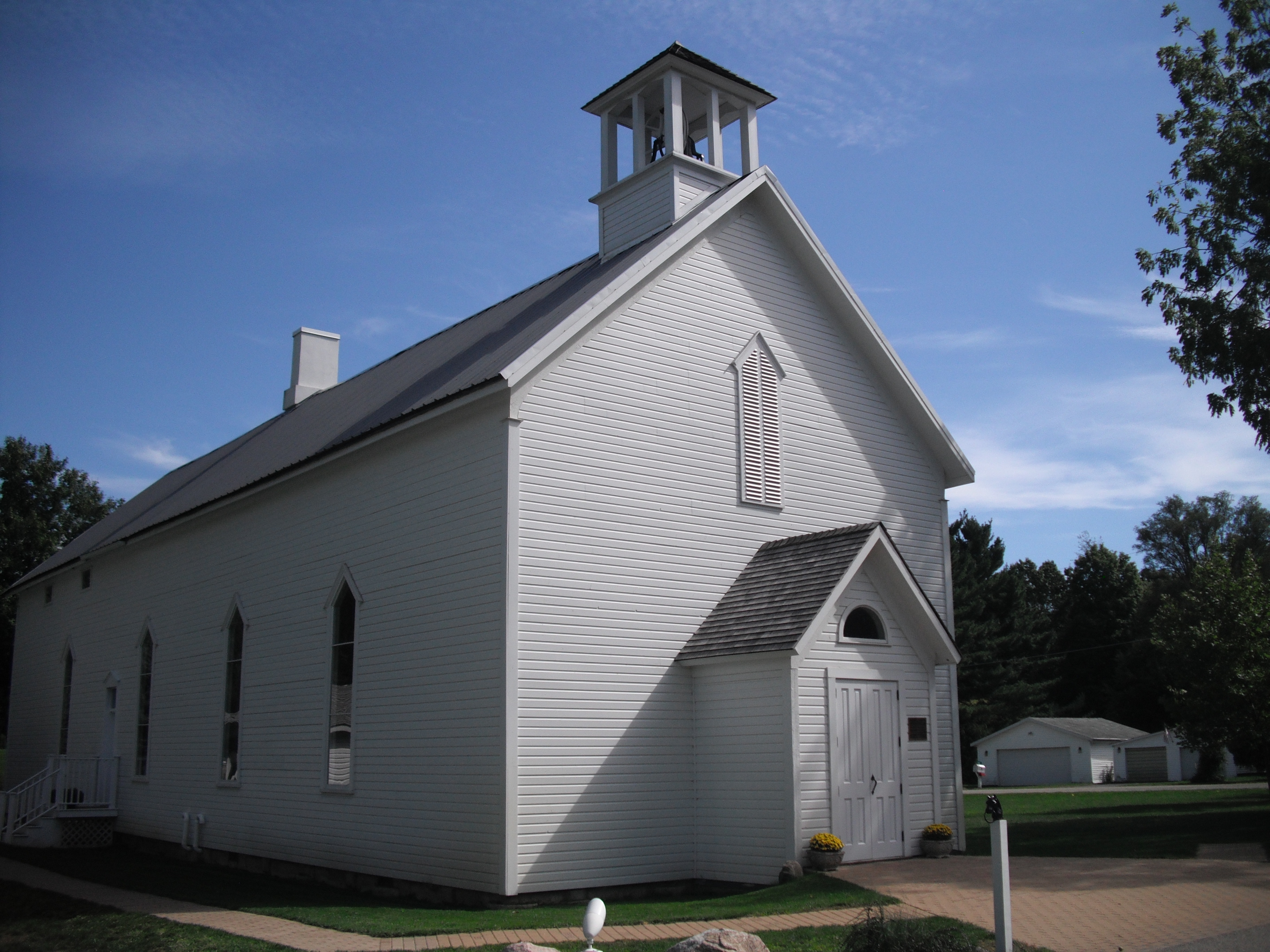

- Location within Michigan Location within the United States
- Interactive map
- Location: 61041 Vermont St., Pokagon Township, Michigan
- Coordinates: 41°54′43″N 86°10′26″W
- Area: less than one acre
- Built: 1862
- Architectural style: Late Victorian
- NRHP reference No.: 02000295

Significant dates
- Added to NRHP: April 1, 2002
- Designated MSHS: January 20, 2000

The First Methodist Episcopal Church of Pokagon (also known as the Old Rugged Cross Church) is a historic church at 61041 Vermont Street in Pokagon Township, Michigan. It is the location of the first performance of the hymn "The Old Rugged Cross." The church was listed as a Michigan State Historic Site in 2000 and added to the National Register of Historic Places in 2002.

== History ==
Methodist circuit-riders began holding religious services in Pokagon Township in the 1830s. In 1840, a class was organized in Sumnerville. Eventually, the First Methodist Episcopal Church of Pokagon was organized.

In approximately 1862, this building was constructed as a hop barn. In 1876, the First Methodist Episcopal Church of Pokagon purchased the building and enlarged and remodeled it into a church. A belfry (later removed) was added, as were pointed-head windows, stained glass, and interior pews.

In 1913, the church's pastor Rev. Leroy Bostwick invited his friend. the Rev. George Bennard, to Pokagon to assist in a series of revival meetings at the church. At the meeting, the church choir performed Bennard's newly penned hymn, "The Old Rugged Cross;" it was the first time the hymn was performed in public. Afterward, the Reverend and Mrs. Bostwick financed the first printing of the "Old Rugged Cross," and it quickly became one of the most popular hymns in the United States.

In 1914, the congregation purchased the nearby Baptist church, selling this church to John Phillips, who used it as a storage barn. He removed the floor, and the building slowly fell into disrepair.

In 1998, the church was purchased for restoration. As of 2013, the restoration was 85% complete, with over $800,000 spent. The same year, the church received a Governor's Award for Historic Preservation. The restoration was finished in 2021.

== Description ==
The First Methodist Episcopal Church of Pokagon is a rectangular, two-story vernacular building measuring 90 feet (27 m) by 28 feet (8.5 m). It has a gable roof and horizontal bevel-edge siding. A gabled entryway projects from the front facade, and pointed-head windows line the sides. Inside, a flat-ceilinged sanctuary takes up most of the space, with a kitchen at the rear. A Sunday school area is located above the kitchen.

== See also ==
- Barn Church (Troy, Michigan)
- National Register of Historic Places listings in Cass County, Michigan
