= Bruce Craig =

British businessperson and owner of Bath Rugby club (born 1962)

Bruce Craig (born December 1962) is a businessperson, entrepreneur and owner of Bath Rugby club.

As of 2017, Craig has a net worth of £300 million, according to The Sunday Times Rich List.

== Early life ==
Born in Bristol, Craig's father John Craig an English businessman worked for British American Tobacco.

Craig was educated at St Brendan's College while it was still a grammar school and captained the school's rugby 1st XV. At the age of eighteen he was selected to play rugby union for the south of England schools, but missed the trial for the England Under 19 final due to a fractured leg. Craig then studied Sport and Business management at Loughborough University, achieving a Bachelor of Science degree.

Between 1987 and 1993, Craig played rugby for French team Racing Club de France.

== Career ==
Craig joined Marken, a logistics business founded in 1980, as a graduate.

In 1997 Marken was acquired for £2.5m by Ocean Group (later to become Exel Logistics and merge into Deutsche Post).

In 1999 Craig was appointed CEO of the company, and from that point Craig led a number of successful management buyouts over a period of 10 years.

The first transaction in 2003 saw 3I venture capital enter into the shareholding of Marken for a price of £210m. 3i then exited the business for £420m after 2 years making £100m profit from the transaction. In 2005, Craig led a secondary management buyout with the backing of ICG. Craig and the management now owned a significant majority stake in the new business.

By this stage Marken had become a pharmaceutical support services company, specialising in transporting pharmaceutical products between clinical trials, research companies and biotechnology laboratories. It also distributed vaccines, clinical trial kits, and investigational drugs. It was growing revenues at more than 20 per cent a year.

In 2009, the company was bought by Apax Partners for £975 million. Apax aimed to finance the company's continued expansion into emerging markets, such as Asia, South America, and central and eastern Europe. (This was the first major private equity transaction in the world after the collapse of Lehman Brothers and the financial crash of 2008). Apax was understood to own some two-thirds of the business and the management team much of the remainder. Craig continued to hold a minority stake. Craig stood back from the business as non-executive chairman to concentrate on other activities.

== Rugby ==
In 2010, Craig acquired 100% of Bath Rugby and moved the club's administrative headquarters into Farleigh House, where the new training facilities were situated. In 2014, he advocated for an integrated global rugby season. In 2018, he also announced plans to build a new 18,000-capacity stadium for the club. Between 2010 and 2018 Craig is believed to have put £18m into Bath Rugby. In June 2024, he claimed he had no idea how many millions he had put into Bath but that it had all been worth it. In the same interview he described the 2023–24 Premiership Rugby as his favourite season yet under his tenure as owner, despite losing the final to Northampton Saints, but outlined his vision for Bath to be at the top of both the Premiership and Champions Cup for the next 10 years and beyond.

In April 2025, he voiced his support for Premiership Rugby to re-launch through an IPL-style licensing system while also scrapping relegation to help bring investment and stability to the competition.

== Personal life ==
Craig's wife Catherine is French, and they have two sons. They have homes in Bath and Aix en Provence in the South of France. He has a private jet.
