= Sarah Goad =

British public official

Dame Sarah Jane Frances Goad, DCVO (née Lambert; born 1940) is a British public official.

Goad was born in 1940; her parents were Uvedale Henry Hoare Lambert and Diana Mary Lambert. Diana was killed by a German flying bomb at the family home in Bletchingley, Surrey in 1944. Uvedale married Melanie after the war, who was from the USA. She worked for the publishers Faber and Faber from 1959 until 1970, when she became a partner in Lambert Farmers (she had been a director of Tilburstow Farms Co. for seven years prior to this). She continued as a partner until 1994.

In the meantime, Goad became increasingly involved in public life; she was appointed a magistrate for Surrey in 1974, and was Deputy Chair of the bench's Family Panel from 1992 to 1997. She sat on a range of other local organisations and chaired Southwark Cathedral Council from 2000 to 2008.

In 1997, Goad became Lord Lieutenant of Surrey and in 2012 was appointed a Dame Commander of the Royal Victorian Order for her service in that office; she retired three years later.

Honorary titles
Preceded by Richard Thornton	Lord-Lieutenant of Surrey; 1997–2015	Succeeded by Michael More-Molyneux

== Sources ==
McCleave, David John (2nd edition, 2024). Bletchingley and The Grange, A Pictorial and Social History of a Quintessentially English Village, p 273. Crediton, Devon: Shakspeare Editorial
