= St Alban's, Cheam =

Coordinates: 51.3680°N 0.2066°W

- Cheam, St Alban the Martyr
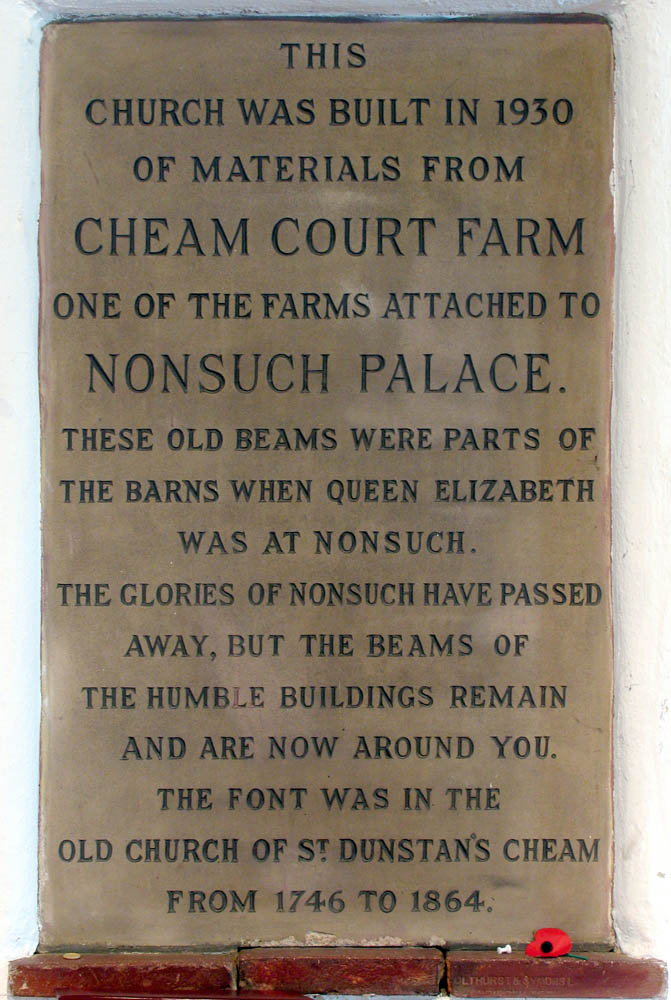
- Foundation stone
- St Alban's, Cheam
- Location: Elmbrook Road, Cheam, London Borough of Sutton
- Country: England
- Denomination: Church of England
- Website: www.cheamparish.org.uk (Cheam parish)

Architecture
- Architect(s): Charles J Marshall and Edward Swan
- Years built: 1930

Specifications
- Materials: brick, timber

Administration
- Division: Croydon Archdeanery
- Diocese: SOUTHWARK
- Parish: Cheam

Clergy
- Priest: Rev Nick Peacock (Team Rector)

St Alban's, Cheam, also known as the Church of St Alban the Martyr, is one of three Church of England churches in the parish of Cheam in the London Borough of Sutton.

It was founded in 1930 and, inspired by the building of a barn church in North Sheen (now incorporated into Kew), was constructed using materials from the farmhouse, barns and other outbuildings at Cheam Court Farm, which may have been connected with Henry VIII's Nonsuch Palace. Edward Swan, the Barn Church's architect, was also commissioned as one of the architects for the new church at Cheam.

The church has a service of worship on Sundays at 10.30 am and a weekday Eucharist at 10:00 am on Wednesdays. Evensong is at 6:00 pm on the 1st Sunday of the month.

The parish publishes a newsletter.

== See also ==
- The Barn Church, Kew
- Barn Church, Culloden
- Barn Church (Michigan)

== Gallery ==
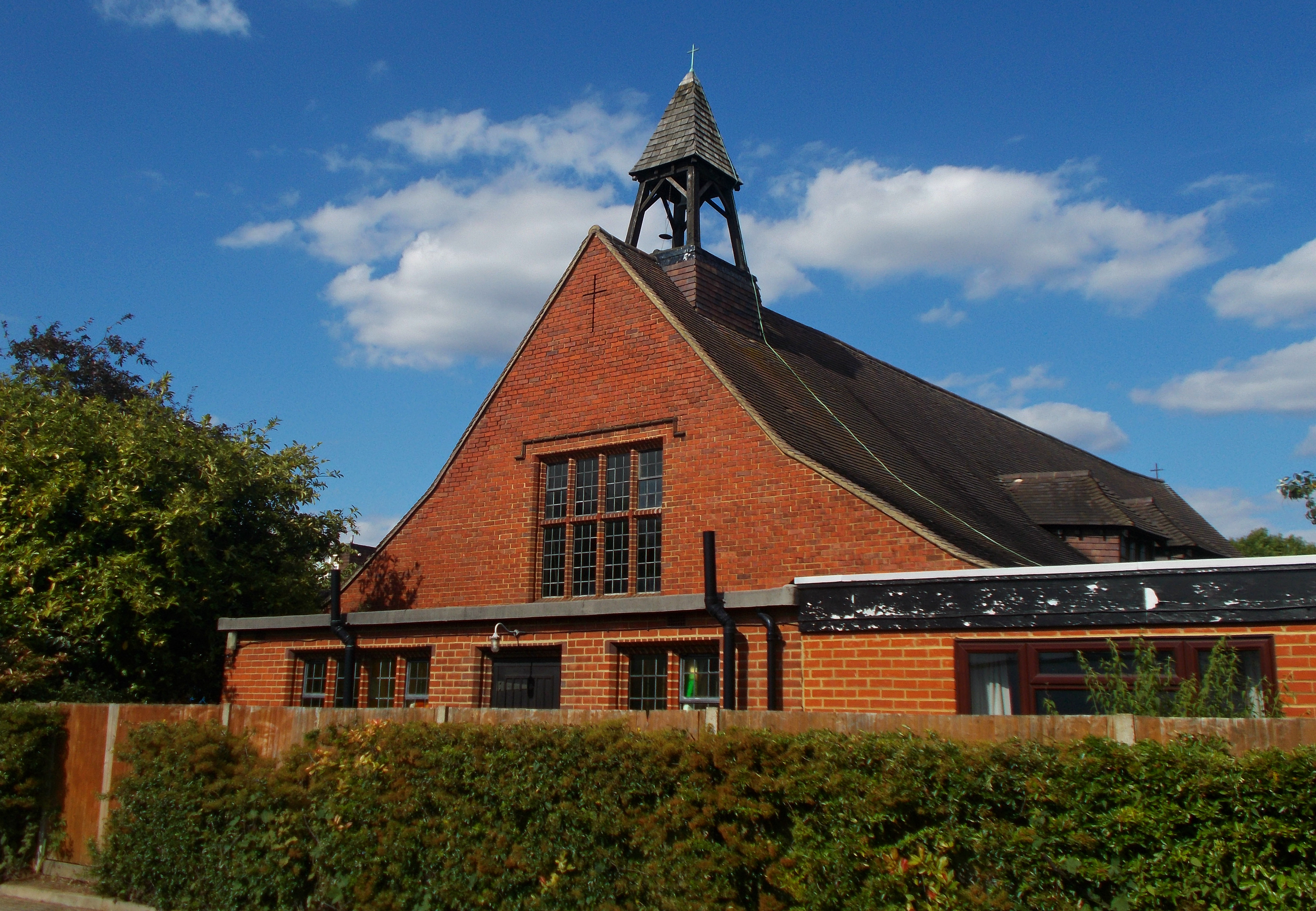
St Alban's Church

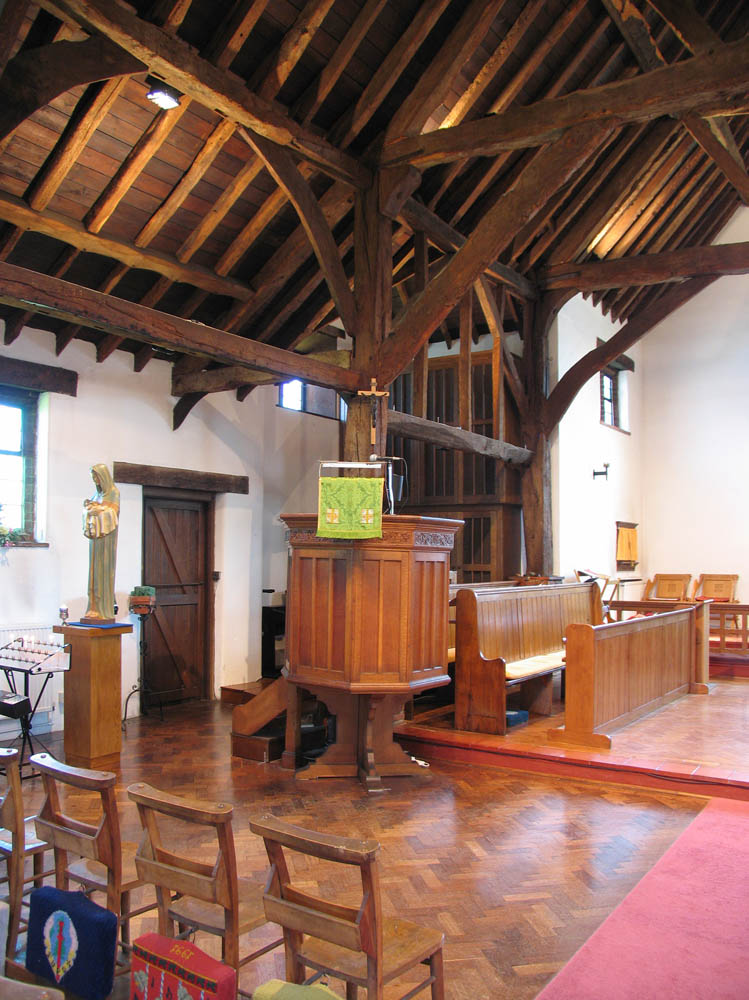
The pulpit

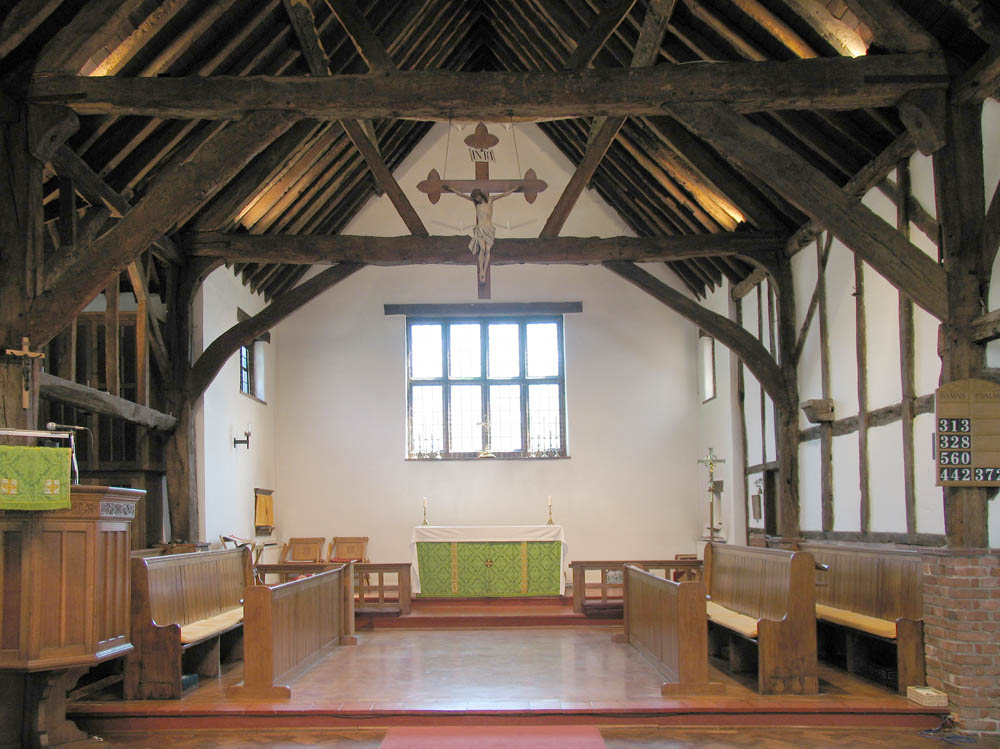
The chancel
