= Richard Thornton (landowner) =

English landowner (1922–2014)

Sir Richard Eustace Thornton KCVO OBE (10 October 1922 – 7 January 2014) was Lord Lieutenant of Surrey from 2 May 1986 until 29 October 1997.

He was the son of Eustace Edward Thornton of Seale, Surrey, and his wife Myrtle Estelle Bellamy, and was educated at Eton College and Trinity College, Cambridge. He married in 1964 Gabrielle Elizabeth Sharpe, daughter of William Henry Sharpe; the couple had four daughters.

Honorary titles
Preceded by The Lord Hamilton of Dalzell	Lord-Lieutenant of Surrey; 1986–1997	Succeeded by Dame Sarah Goad
