= Uvedale Lambert =

English local historian and antiquarian

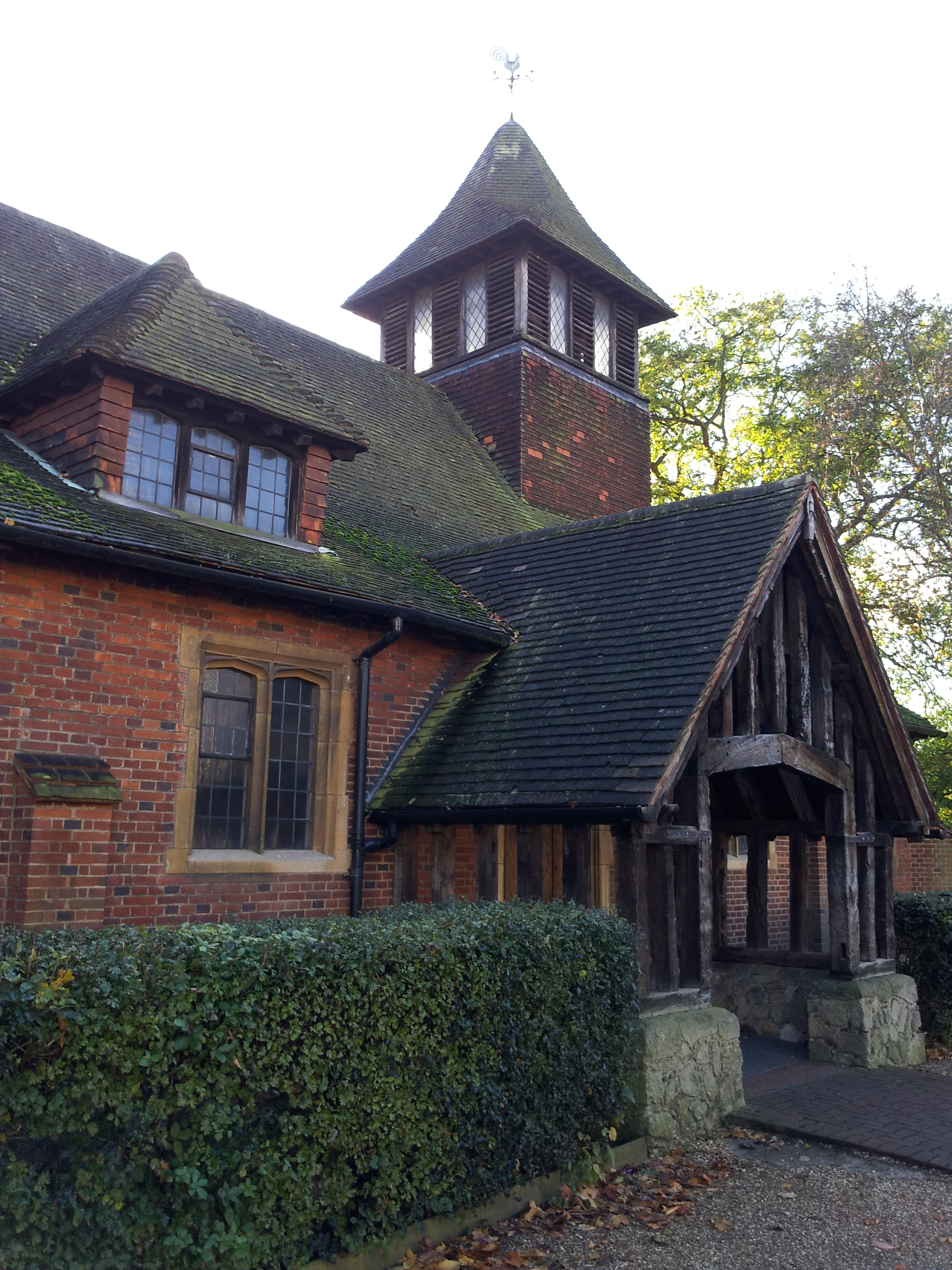
The Barn Church, Kew

Alfred Uvedale Miller Lambert FSA (1870–1928) was an English local historian and antiquarian. He and his wife Cecily (Jane Frances Cecily, née Hoare) lived at South Park, Bletchingley, Surrey.

His parents were Henry Thomas Lambert and Georgina Emily Lambert (née Miller), who bought South Park in 1875.

In 1926 Lambert and his wife offered a barn (and also the adjoining stables) which they owned at Stonehall Farm, Hurst Green, Oxted, Surrey as one of the 25 new churches wanted in the Diocese of Southwark. The barn was moved to North Sheen (now incorporated into Kew), where it was reconstructed as a church, St Philip and All Saints, now known as The Barn Church, Kew. Lambert died before its completion, and the church is dedicated in his memory. The lady chapel at The Barn Church was furnished in memory of Uvedale and Cecily Lambert by their son Uvedale Lambert and was dedicated by The Venerable Charles Lambert on All Saints' Day, 2 November 1933.

Lambert's papers were donated to Surrey History Centre in Woking by his granddaughter, Sarah Goad.

== Family ==
The Lamberts had one child, a son, Uvedale Henry Hoare Lambert (1909–1983), who inherited South Park and, like his father, was also a local historian.

== Works ==
- Bletchingley: a parish history, together with some account of the family of De Clere chiefly in the south of England (1921), Mitchell Hughes and Clark
- Godstone: a parish history (1929). Printed for private circulation, 1929. Published online by Cambridge University Press, 2012
