= 1978 Epsom and Ewell by-election =

UK parliamentary by-election

The 1978 Epsom and Ewell by-election of 27 April 1978 was held after Conservative Member of Parliament (MP) Peter Rawlinson was made a Life peer. The Conservatives held on to the seat in the by-election. Amongst the candidates for the by-election was pop music impresario Jonathan King, who stood as a Royalist candidate.

== Result ==
Epsom and Ewell by-election 1978
Party	Candidate	Votes	%	±%
Conservative	Archie Hamilton	28,242	63.61	+9.55
Labour	Anthony Mooney	7,314	16.47	−2.84
Liberal	Michael Anderson	5,673	12.78	−13.85
Royalist	Jonathan King	2,350	5.29	New
National Front	James Sawyer	823	1.85	New
Majority		20,928	47.14	+19.72
Turnout		44,402		
Conservative hold		Swing		
