= Lord Lieutenant of Surrey =

Civil post in Surrey, England

This is a list of people who have served as Lord Lieutenant of Surrey. Since 1737, all Lords Lieutenant have also been Custos Rotulorum of Surrey.

== Lord Lieutenants of Surrey ==
- William Parr, 1st Marquess of Northampton 1551–1553?
- William Howard, 1st Baron Howard of Effingham 1559–1573
- Charles Howard, 1st Earl of Nottingham 3 July 1585 – 14 December 1624 jointly with
- Charles Howard, 2nd Earl of Nottingham 27 July 1621 – 1642 jointly with
- John Ramsay, 1st Earl of Holderness 5 June 1624 – February 1626 and
- Edward Cecil, 1st Viscount Wimbledon 5 January 1627 – 16 November 1638 and
- Thomas Howard, 21st Earl of Arundel 23 July 1635 – 1642 and
- Henry Howard, Lord Maltravers 2 June 1636 – 1642
- Interregnum
- John Mordaunt, 1st Viscount Mordaunt 16 July 1660 – 5 June 1675
- Prince Rupert of the Rhine 24 June 1675 – 29 November 1682
- Henry Howard, 7th Duke of Norfolk 16 December 1682 – 2 April 1701
- Charles Berkeley, 2nd Earl of Berkeley 7 June 1702 – 24 September 1710
- George FitzRoy, 1st Duke of Northumberland 9 October 1710 – 24 December 1714
- Charles Montagu, 1st Earl of Halifax 24 December 1714 – 19 May 1715
- John Campbell, 2nd Duke of Argyll 16 July 1715 – 6 July 1716
- Richard Onslow, 1st Baron Onslow 6 July 1716 – 5 December 1717
- Thomas Onslow, 2nd Baron Onslow 9 December 1717 – 5 June 1740
- Richard Onslow, 3rd Baron Onslow 13 November 1740 – 8 October 1776
- George Onslow, 1st Earl of Onslow 20 November 1776 – 17 May 1814
- George Brodrick, 4th Viscount Midleton 15 June 1814 – 27 September 1830
- Charles George Perceval, 2nd Baron Arden 27 September 1830 – 5 July 1840
- William King-Noel, 1st Earl of Lovelace 17 July 1840 – 29 December 1893
- Admiral Francis Egerton 25 September 1893 – 15 December 1895
- William Brodrick, 8th Viscount Midleton 29 January 1896 – 19 December 1905
- Henry Cubitt, 2nd Baron Ashcombe 19 December 1905 – 6 June 1939
- Sir John Malcolm Fraser, 1st Baronet 6 June 1939 – 4 May 1949
- Gen. Sir Robert Haining 2 August 1949 – 6 August 1957
- Geoffrey FitzClarence, 5th Earl of Munster 6 August 1957 – 12 March 1973
- John Hamilton, 3rd Baron Hamilton of Dalzell 12 March 1973 – 2 May 1986
- Sir Richard Thornton 2 May 1986 – 29 October 1997
- Dame Sarah Goad 29 October 1997 – 23 August 2015
- Michael More-Molyneux 24 August 2015 – 3 September 2026
- Neelam Dharni 3 September 2026

== Deputy lieutenants ==
A deputy lieutenant of Surrey is commissioned by the Lord Lieutenant of Surrey. Deputy lieutenants support the work of the lord-lieutenant. There can be several deputy lieutenants at any time, depending on the population of the county. Their appointment does not terminate with the changing of the lord-lieutenant, but they usually retire at age 75.

=== 19th Century ===
- 18 July 1848: James William Freshfield
- August 1852: Henry Gosse
