= The Barn Church, Kew =

Coordinates: 51.4721°N 0.2822°W

- St. Philip and All Saints
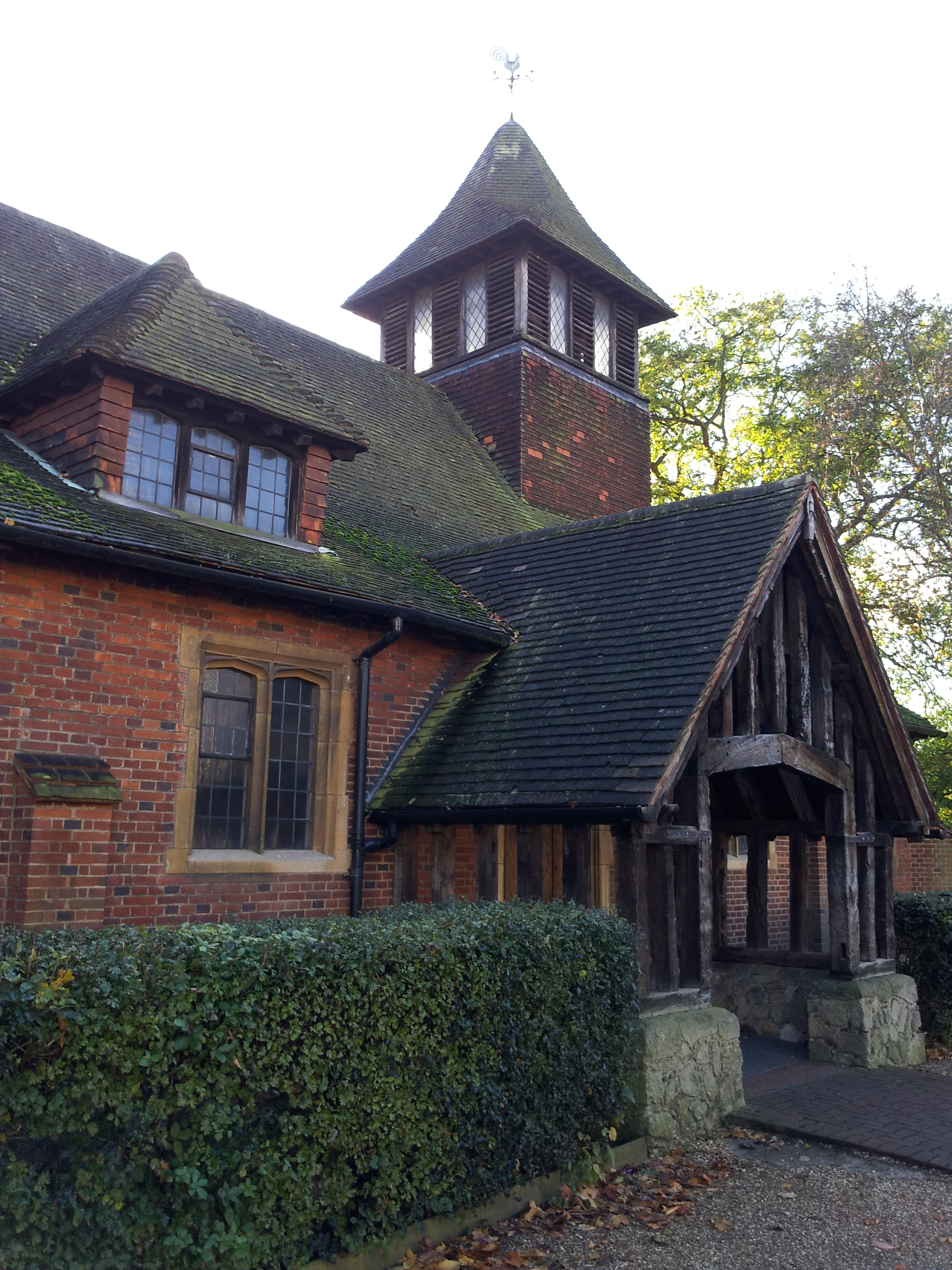
- The Barn Church, Kew
- The Barn Church, Kew
- OS grid reference: TQ 19404 76191
- Location: Atwood Avenue, Kew, Richmond TW9 4HF
- Country: England
- Denomination: Church of England
- Website: barnchurchkew.uk

History
- Founded: 1929
- Dedication: St Philip
- Dedicated: 4 February 1929
- Consecrated: 1 May 1928

Architecture
- Architect: Edward Swan
- Years built: 1928

Specifications
- Materials: brick, timber

Administration
- Division: Wandsworth Archdeanery
- Diocese: SOUTHWARK
- Parish: Kew, St Philip & All Saints

Clergy
- Vicar: Rev Dr Melanie Harrington

The Barn Church, Kew, formally known as St Philip and All Saints, is the first barn church to be consecrated in England. The building, which is not listed, is on the corner of Atwood Avenue and Marksbury Avenue, in an area previously known as North Sheen and now in Kew, in the London Borough of Richmond upon Thames. It was constructed in 1929 from a 17th (or possibly 16th) century barn from Oxted in Surrey. The west end was converted in 2002 into a large parish room with a gallery above looking down the length of the building. The sanctuary was refurbished and remodelled in 1998.

St Philip and All Saints is part of a joint parish with St Luke's Church, Kew, under the same vicar, Rev Dr Melanie Harrington, who took up the role in June 2021. It is a member of the Anglican Communion and Church of England and, locally, is part of Churches Together in Kew. The parish is almost entirely residential and many of the residents work in central London.

== Activities ==
The church has a service of worship on Sundays at 9.30 a.m. The church and adjacent hall (built in 1967) are a hub for the local neighbourhood as there are few other community facilities in the area. A number of children's activities, including a nursery school, are held there.

== History ==
Before St Philip and All Saints was built, local Anglicans worshipped at St Peter's, a hall erected in 1910 on the corner of Marksbury Avenue and Chilton Road. The hall was demolished in the 1990s and a block of sheltered housing (St Philip's Court) now stands on the site.

The new church was constructed from timbers taken from a barn (and also the adjoining stables) which stood at Stonehall Farm, Hurst Green, Oxted, Surrey. The original barn was an L-shaped building dating from the 17th or possibly the 16th century. Some of the beams may have been originally ships' timbers. In 1926 the owners, local historian Uvedale Lambert and his wife Cecily (née Hoare) of South Park, Bletchingley, Surrey, in conjunction with members of the Hoare family, who gave generous financial assistance, offered the barn as one of the 25 new churches wanted in the Diocese of Southwark. It was decided to move the barn to North Sheen (now incorporated into Kew), where the generosity of Hugh Leyborne Popham had already provided a site. Edward Swan of Oxted was the architect, and Mr J J Fuller of Chiswick the contractor. The church cost only £5,000 to build (exclusive of fittings), of which the diocese paid about half. It may therefore claim to be probably the cheapest church of its size ever built.

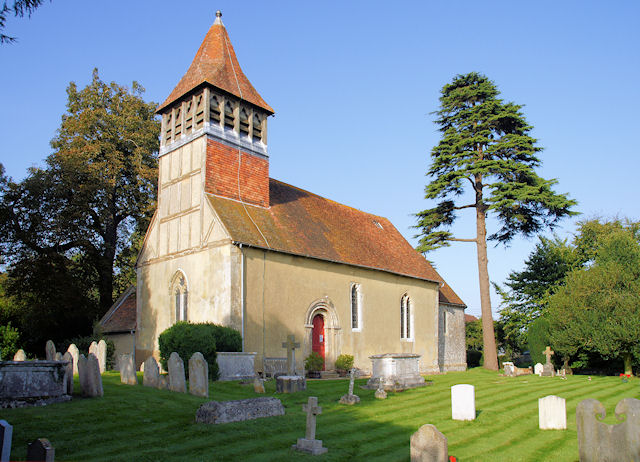
The Barn Church's broach spire is copied from the spire at this church near Winchester in Hampshire – St Swithun's Church, Martyr Worthy.

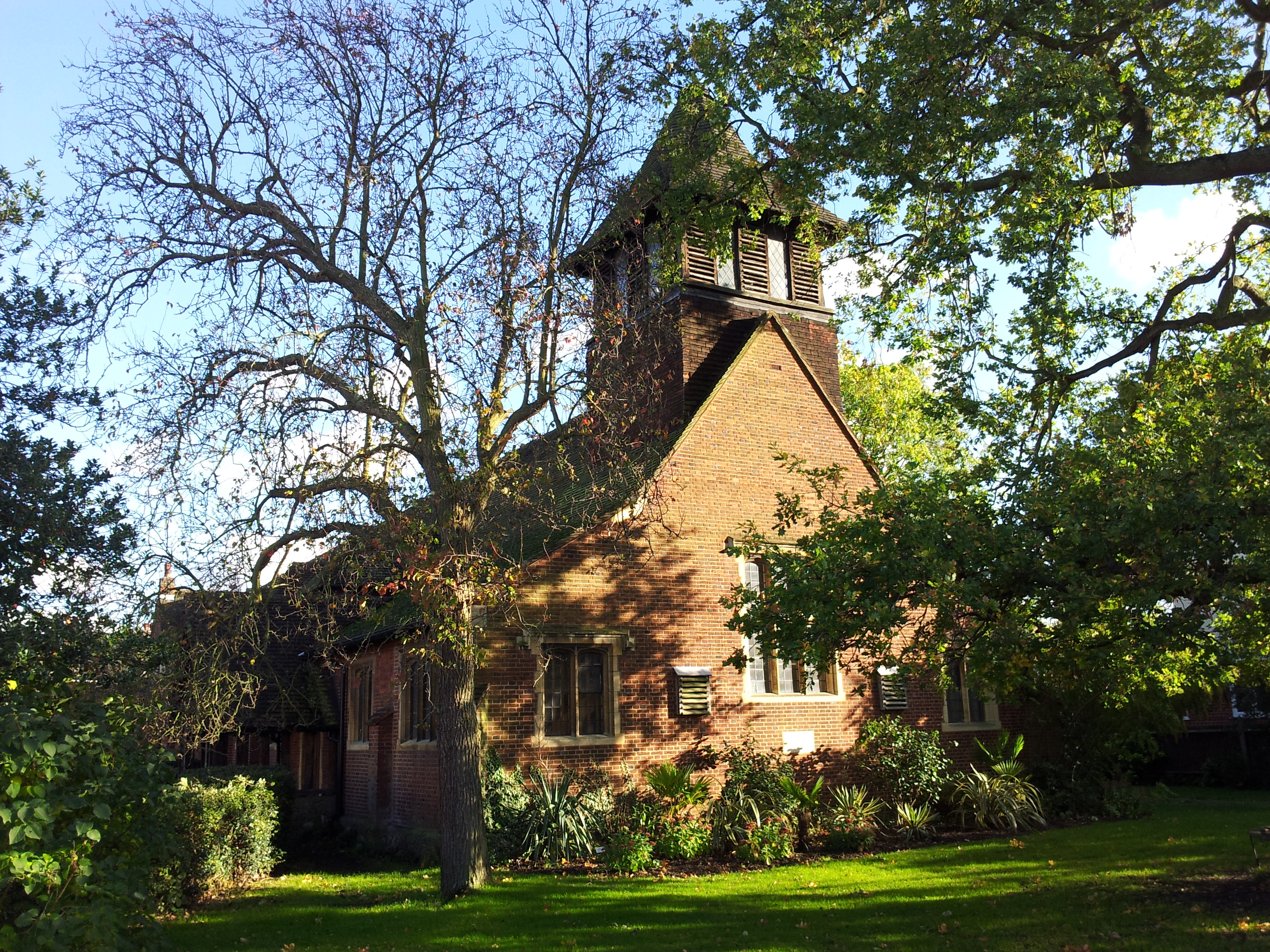
The Barn Church, from the west

The barn was given to the diocese by the Lambert family, with major contributions from their Hoare relations, one of whom – Walter Hoare of Basingstoke – supplied specially baked tiles and two-inch bricks of 17th-century style to match the timbers. The bricks are of the two-inch type which were used at the time the barn was built. The slate slabs in the porches are the original threshing floor of the barn. The mullioned windows are copied from Compton Wynyates in Warwickshire. The tower-frame, copied from Tandridge Church near Oxted, was made from timber cut at South Park, Bletchingley. The bell was given by Holy Trinity, Wandsworth. The broach spire was copied from St Swithun's Church, Martyr Worthy near Winchester.

In 1928 the barn was pulled down at Stonehall, each beam carefully numbered, loaded on to lorries and carted to North Sheen where it was re-erected. (The numbers can still be seen on the beams.) As few alterations were made as possible. The roof was "hipped" to give greater width to the aisles, and brick walls substituted for weatherboards, but the stone "plinth" is original.

=== Dedication ===
The foundation stone was laid by Mrs Philip Hoare and consecrated by the Bishop of Woolwich (Dr William Hough) on 1 May 1928 (1 May is St. Philip's day in the Anglican Communion's calendar). The building was dedicated by the Bishop of Southwark (Dr Cyril Garbett; later to become Archbishop of York) on 4 February 1929.

The church was built in memory of Henry Gerard Hoare of Stansted House, Godstone, who died in 1896, and Jane Frances his wife who died in 1913; of their eldest son Henry Gerard Philip Hoare who died in 1918; of Gerard Croft Hoare who died in 1918 of wounds received on active service during World War I; of his mother Joyce who died in 1925, the first wife of Geoffrey Hoare; and of Uvedale Lambert (1870–1928) who died before the dedication of the church. A tablet at the west end records their names.

=== Internal fittings ===
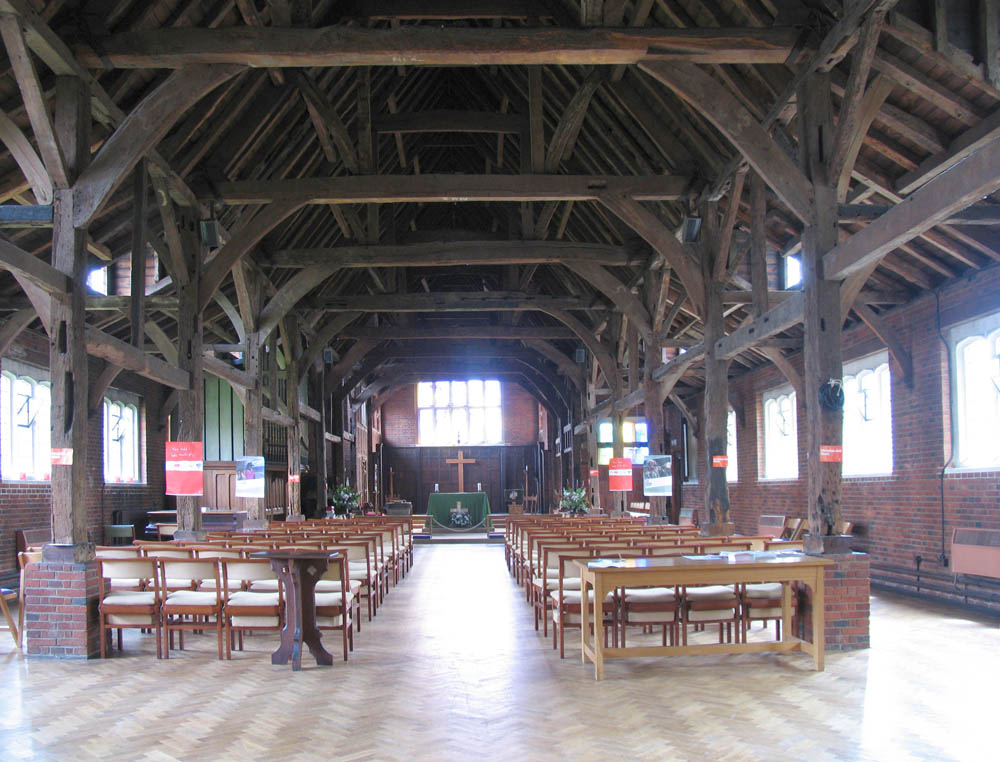
Interior of the Barn Church

The lady chapel was furnished in memory of Uvedale and Cecily Lambert by their son Uvedale Lambert. The work was designed by Hugh Ray Easton of Cambridge, executed by Mr C Hammond of Kew and dedicated by The Venerable Charles Lambert on All Saints' Day, 2 November 1933. The cedar wood used was given by the Rev Gerard Hoare, Rector of Godstone, and came from one large tree blown down in the churchyard there in 1927. The sanctuary chairs are also made from it. The stained glass window in the lady chapel is a memorial to Peter Flint, churchwarden at the Barn Church for 20 years. It was designed in 1999 by his daughter, Christine Flint Sato.

The pulpit, carved by Geoffrey Hoare, is a copy of that in Hereford Cathedral from which Herbert Croft, Bishop of Hereford, denounced the Puritan soldiers for misusing the cathedral in Oliver Cromwell's time.

The plain poppy-heads of the choir-stalls came from St. Dunstan-in-the-West, Fleet Street. Discarded during renovations carried out there in about 1860, they were bought by Henry Gerard Hoare and presented by Hoare's Bank whose Fleet Street premises were almost opposite the church.

The Jacobean altar rails came from Writtle Church, Essex. The font is a copy of that at Aldenham, Hertfordshire, and is cut in "Surrey" marble dug at South Park, Bletchingley.

=== Organ ===
An original 1894 Forster and Andrews two-manual organ was installed in the church in memory of Father John Alban, the Barn Church's first vicar. The manuals are tracker action and there are 13 speaking stops.

=== Church hall and redesign of the Church's west end ===
In 1967 a hall was built on part of the vicarage garden and land adjoining the east end of the church. The architect was George E Cassidy and the main contractors were Martin & Thorpe.

The west end of the Barn Church was redesigned in 2002 by Keith Murray. The long nave was divided into an area for worship and a parish room, with facilities for community use and a gallery above. Oak was employed in the constructional work, to ensure consistency with the original interior.

=== People ===
Former Liberal Party chairman Timothy Beaumont, Baron Beaumont of Whitley, was priest-in-charge from 1986 to 1991. David Frayne, dean of Blackburn Cathedral from 1992 to 2001, was previously vicar at the Barn.

== Architectural impact ==
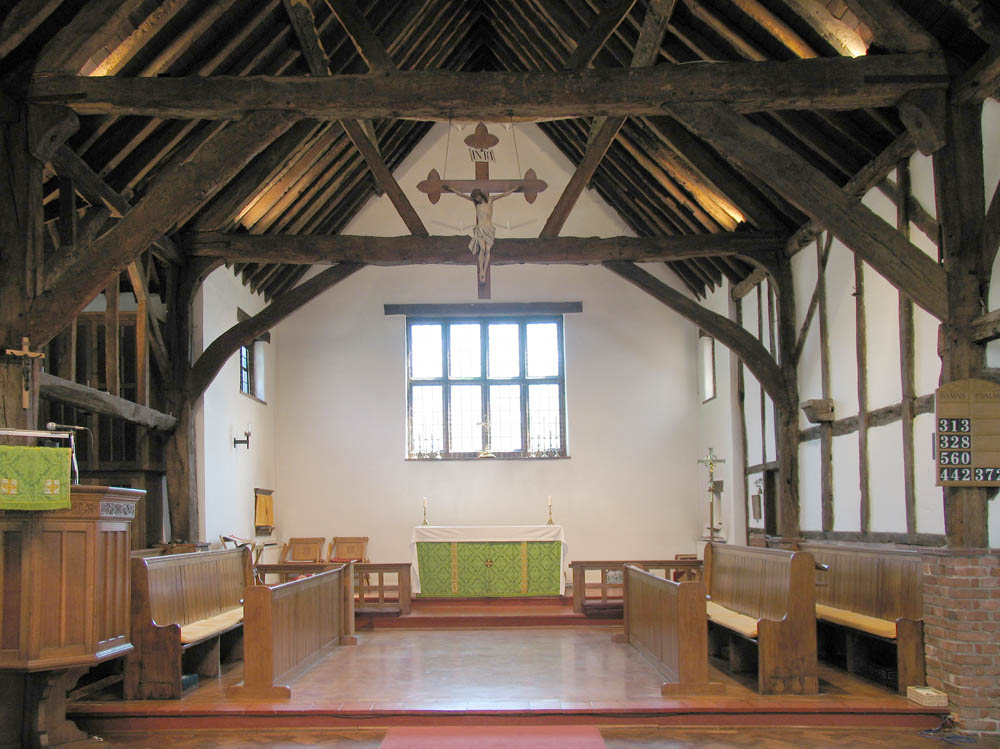
The chancel at St Alban's, Cheam, whose building was inspired by the Barn Church at Kew

The story of the Barn Church at Kew inspired the building, in 1930, of St Alban's, Cheam, constructed out of the old barns and materials of Cheam Court Farm, which may have been connected with Nonsuch Palace, the Tudor royal palace built by Henry VIII. Edward Swan, the Barn Church's architect, was also commissioned as one of the architects for the project.

== See also ==
- Barn Church, Culloden, Scotland
- Barn Church (Troy, Michigan)
- St Alban's, Cheam
- St Anne's Church, Kew
- St Luke's Church, Kew
- Uvedale Lambert
