= Farleigh Hungerford =

Village in Somerset, England

Coordinates: 51.3160°N 2.2872°W

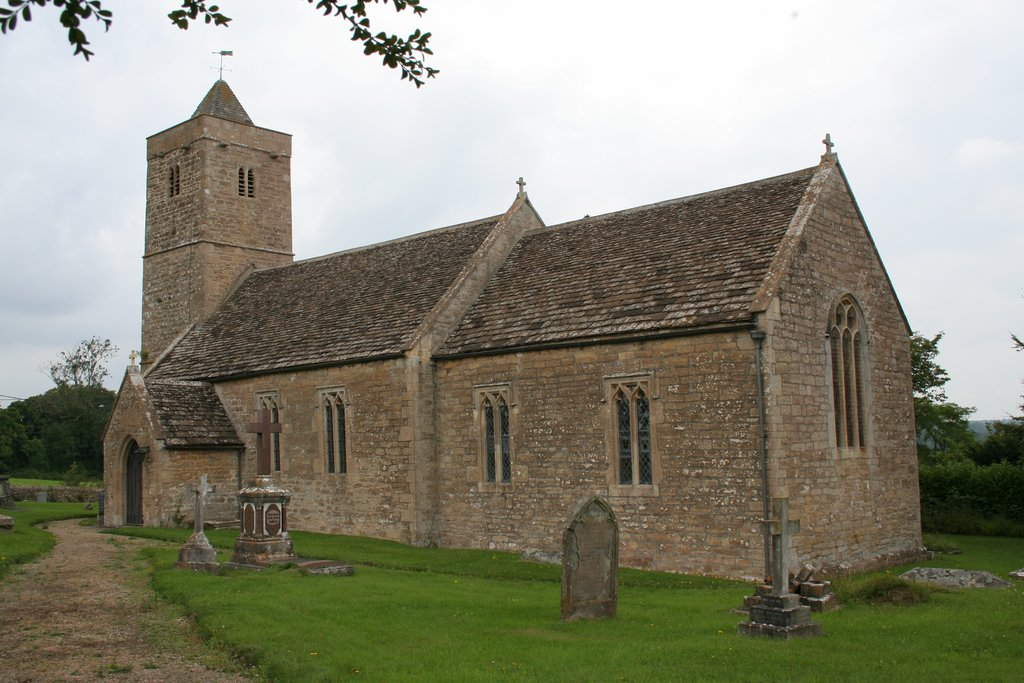
- St Leonards Church

- Location within Somerset
- OS grid reference: ST800574
- Civil parish: Norton St Philip
- Unitary authority: Somerset
- Ceremonial county: Somerset
- Region: South West
- Country: England
- Sovereign state: United Kingdom
- Post town: BATH
- Postcode district: BA2
- Dialling code: 01225
- Police: Avon and Somerset
- Fire: Devon and Somerset
- Ambulance: South Western
- UK Parliament: Frome and East Somerset

Farleigh Hungerford (grid reference ST800576) is a village and former civil parish, now in the parish of Norton St Philip, in the Somerset district, in the ceremonial county of Somerset, England, 9 miles southeast of Bath, 3½ miles west of Trowbridge on A366, between Trowbridge and Radstock in the valley of the River Frome. In 1931 the parish had a population of 98.

Within this small village are the notable ruins of Farleigh Hungerford Castle, which played a significant part in the English Civil War. Evidence has also been found of occupation during Roman times; the foundations of a villa were excavated in a field just north west of the castle in 1822.

From 1985 to 2010 the village was the venue for the annual Trowbridge Village Pump Festival.

== History ==
The manor was called Farleigh Montfort from just after the conquest when it was owned by a Norman family, the Montforts, until the fourteenth century. Then Reginald de Montfort sold the estate to one of Edward III’s soldiers whose family held it only for about a quarter of a century. In 1369 AD Sir Thomas de Hungerford bought the house from the childless daughter of the recently deceased squire, and the house later came to be known as Farleigh Hungerford. The parish of Farleigh Hungerford was part of the Wellow Hundred.

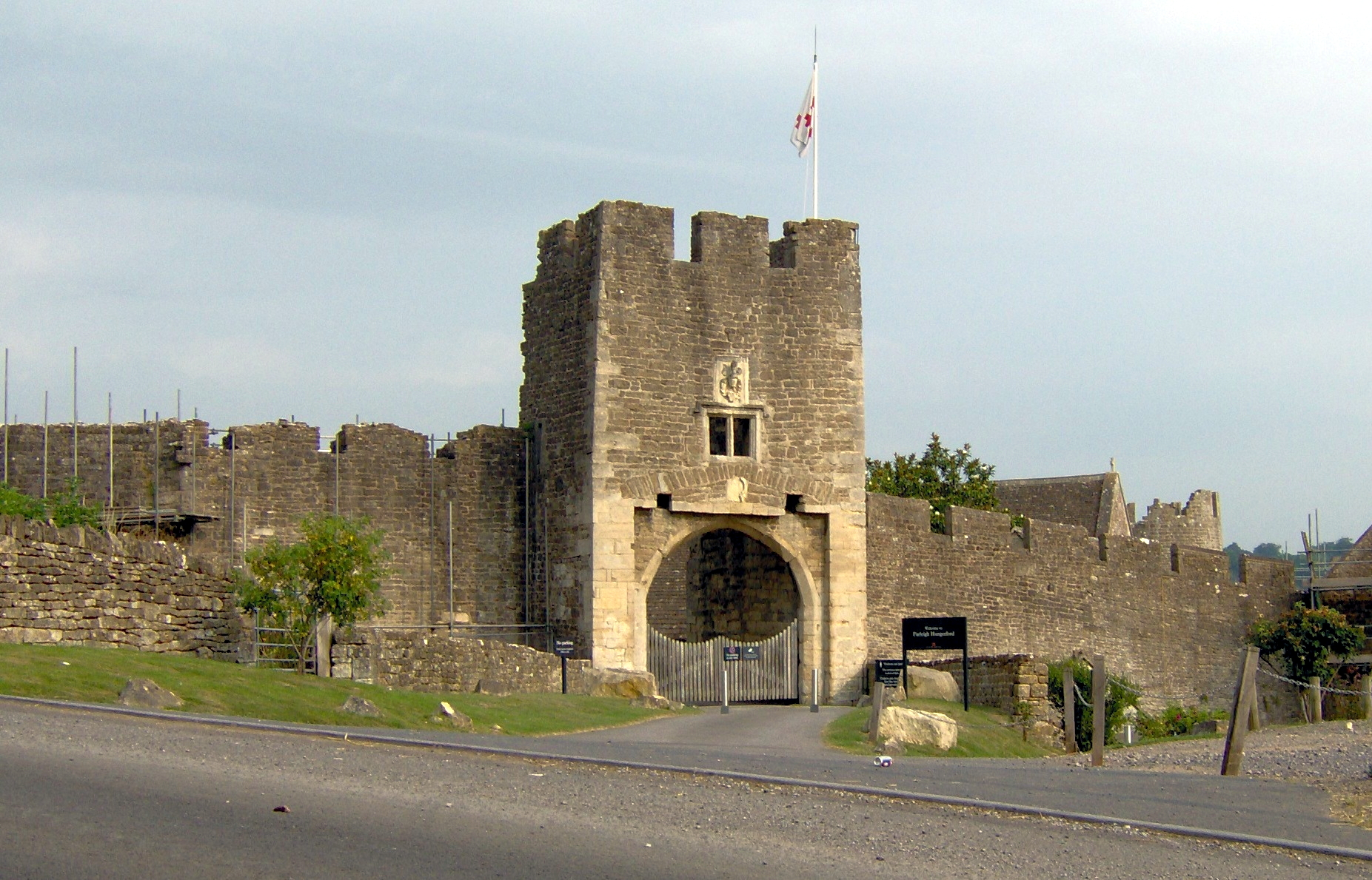
Farleigh Hungerford Castle gateway

It is the location of Farleigh Hungerford Castle, built around 1370 and owned by English Heritage and the former home of Sir Thomas Hungerford, Speaker of the House of Commons. In the early 15th century, his son, Sir Walter Hungerford, enlarged the castle by adding the outer court that enclosed the parish church, St Leonard's, which he used as his chapel. It is thought that he built the present parish church nearby to replace it.

In the Civil War, Sir Edward Hungerford (1596–1648) commanded the Parliamentary forces of Wiltshire briefly. His half-brother, Col John Hungerford, was a Royalist and was given the command of the garrison of Farleigh in 1644. However he surrendered to Sir Edward without fighting in 1645. A later Sir Edward Hungerford (1632–1711), who had been MP for Chippenham during Richard Cromwell's brief reign, entertained Charles II of England at Farleigh in about 1675. After the discovery of the Rye House Plot in 1683, the castle was raided by the government and weapons were seized. The spendthrift Sir Edward was the last male of his family, but by the time of his death he had already sold the castle (in 1686) to Henry Bayntun for £56,000.

Enclosed by a curtain wall with a cylindrical tower at each corner, the squarish inner bailey contained a selection of domestic buildings. Today only two of the towers and some sections of the curtain wall survive. The south west tower stands almost to its full height of five storeys in places, but the south east tower exists only a little more than its third floor. It is a grade I listed building.

On 1 April 1933 the parish was abolished and merged with Norton St Philip.

== Farleigh House ==
Farleigh House is a large country house, previously the centre of the Farleigh Hungerford estate, and has sometimes been called Farleigh New Castle. The present building was started in the 18th century but is mainly an early 19th-century Gothic Revival building. In 2010 it was converted to be used as the offices and training centre of Bath Rugby.

== Church of St Leonard ==
The Anglican parish Church of St Leonard was consecrated in 1443, and remodelled in 1856. It was once within the outer walls of the castle but is now separated from it by the main road. The church, which is a grade II* listed building, has a perpendicular style West Tower in 3 stages, with a pair of stone gargoyles on each face. There are the remains of some 14th-century stained glass in the north window of the nave and in the east Chancel window which are of Flemish origin.

The church also contains a 17th-century wooden altar rail carved with open work scrolls and figures. The pulpit dates from the early 18th century and is carved with eagles and angels.

== Village amenities ==
There is a spot on the river Frome which is used by what is claimed to be the only river swimming club still active in Britain.
