= Beckington Castle =

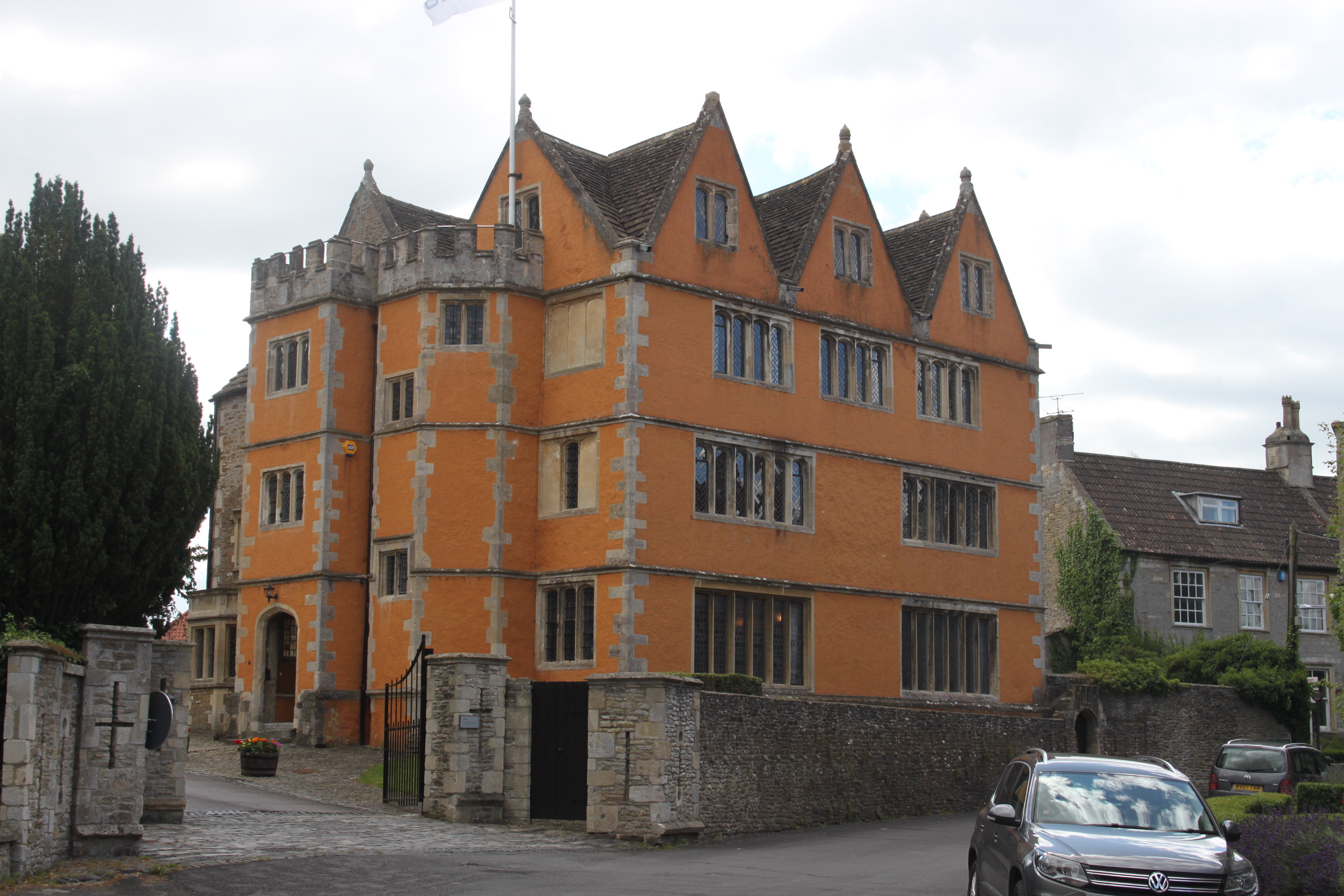
- Beckington Castle in 2015

- Location within Somerset
- 51°15′44″N 2°17′18″W
- Location: Beckington, Somerset, England

History
- Built: 17th century

Listed Building – Grade II*
- Official name: The Castle
- Designated: 11 March 1968
- Reference no.: 1296202

Beckington Castle is a historic house in the village of Beckington, Somerset, England. It is a Grade II* listed building.

It was built in the early 17th century on the site of a medieval building. It has been home to various nobility and local businessmen, also serving as a hotel and school. It is now used as offices.

== History ==
It was originally built in the early 17th century, on the site of an earlier medieval building by William Long (c.1498-1558), a clothier and patron of Beckington Church. In 1569 William's son Thomas lived there. At some time before 1616 it was sold to James Ley, 1st Earl of Marlborough who was Lord Chief Justice of the King's Bench in Ireland and then in England; he was an English Member of Parliament and was Lord High Treasurer from 1624 to 1628. He was also a founder member of the Society of Antiquaries.

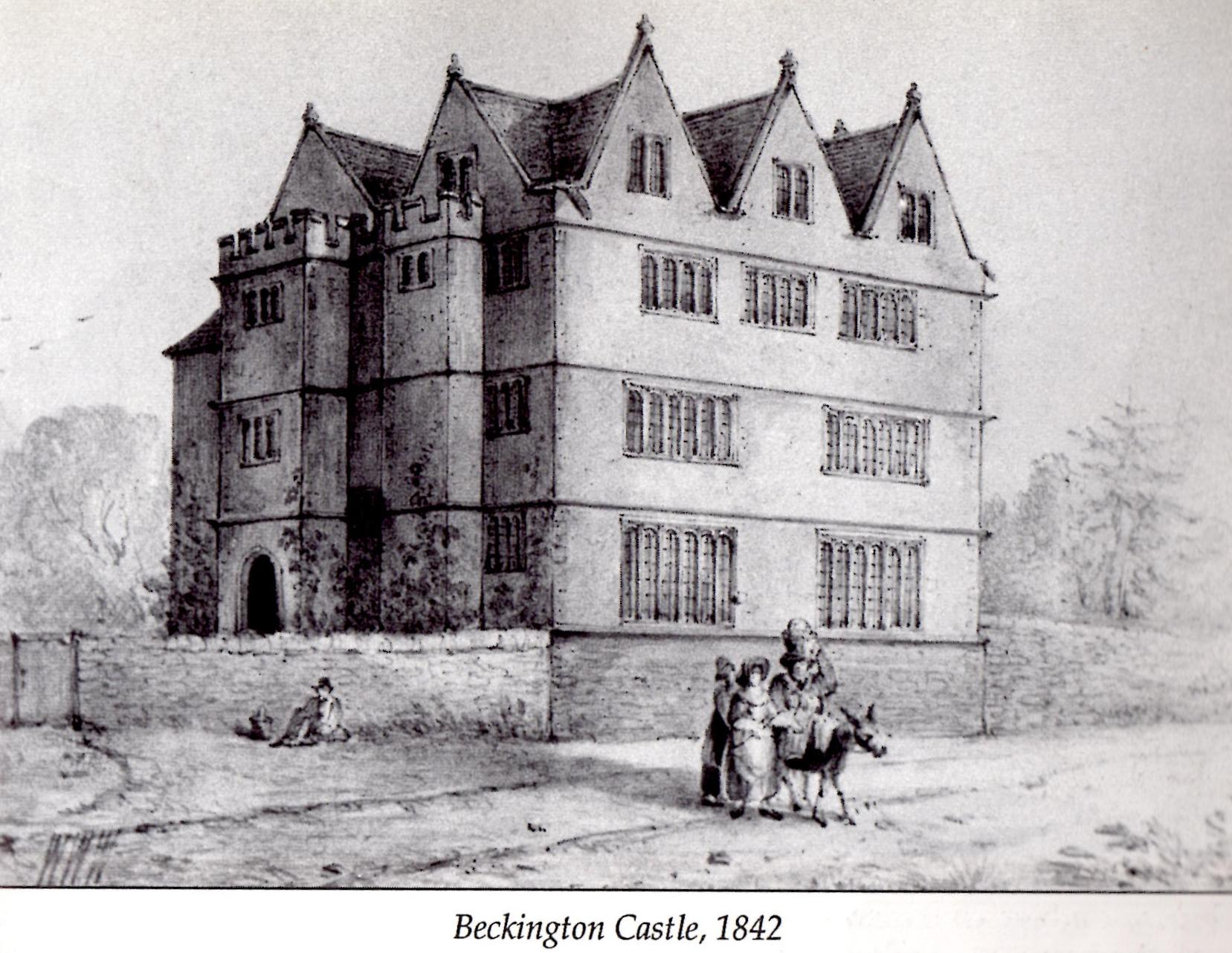
Beckington Castle in 1842

Several local merchants owned the building in the 18th century including Christopher Brewer, Samuel Love, and Nathaniel Mortimer. In the 1780s, Beckington Castle came into the hands of the Chislett family who owned it until 1870. It wasn't until 1839, that the name 'Castle House' was applied to the building. This later evolved into 'The Castle' and later 'Beckington Castle'. In 1870 George Esdaile bought the Castle for £450, the next owner was Colonel Augustus Hill who held it from 1896 until 1901.

Edward Milles Nelson was owner from 1902 to 1926. He was President of the Royal Microscopical Society and author of 'The Cult of Circle Builders'. It was then the home of Captain John Hamilton of the Coldstream Guards, who later became the 3rd Baron Hamilton of Dalzell, and in 1942 it was the birthplace of his second son the politician Archie Hamilton, Baron Hamilton of Epsom.

It has also served as a hotel, and an antiques showroom. From 1945 to 1970, the Ravenscroft School occupied the building. In February, 1966, a fire began in the Castle's boiler room and some of the interior was destroyed. Ravenscroft closed for a week, then continued to operate in its outbuildings while the extensive damage was made good.

The building is reputedly haunted and it may have been the first building in England which was described in an advertisement for sale as being more desirable because it was haunted.

== Current use ==
In 1989, the Castle, which was in poor condition, and grounds were purchased by Systems Engineering & Assessment Ltd (SEA), which provides technical and procurement support to the Ministry of Defence. Between 1995 and 1996 Beckington Castle was restored by SEA as their headquarters, in co-operation with Mendip Council and English Heritage.

== Architecture ==
The three-storey building has three tall gables with copings and finials along the front with two similar gables on each side. The three-storey projection next to the entrance porch contains a wooden spiral staircase.
