= Barn Church, Culloden =

Coordinates: 57°29′14″N 4°8′19″W

Barn Church
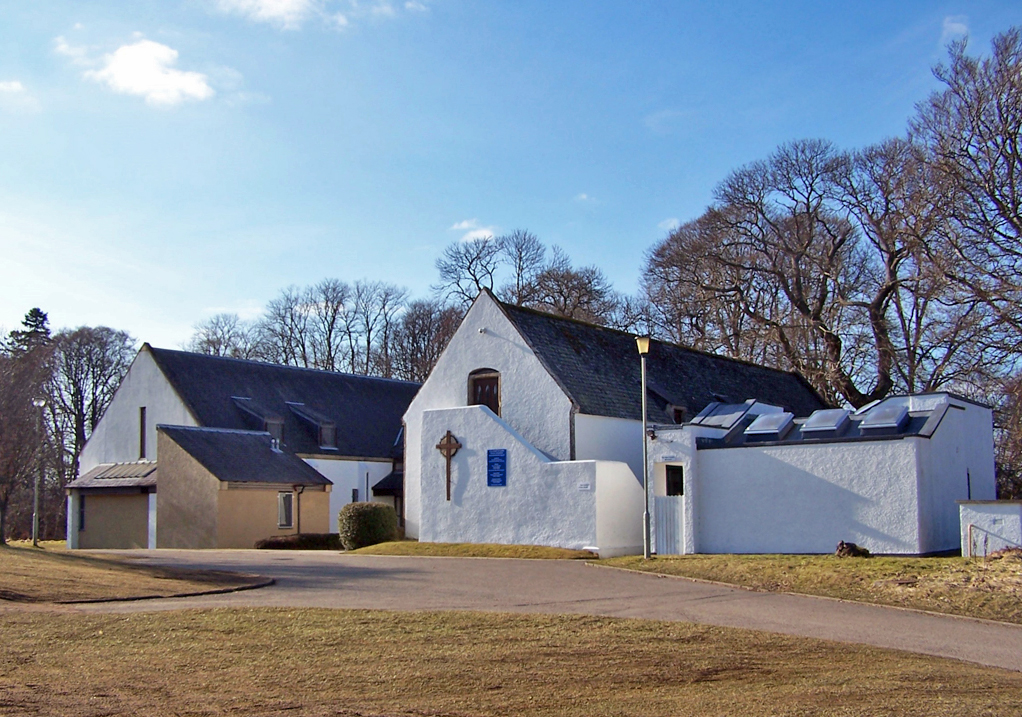
- Barn Church
- Denomination: Church of Scotland
- Website: Barn Church

Administration
- Parish: Culloden and Ardersier

The Barn Church is a parish church of the Church of Scotland at Culloden, in the Presbytery of Clèir Eilean Í. Although the congregation is relatively young, and only received full status as a parish church in its own right in the late 1980s, the building is of considerable historical interest. It was originally built as a tithe barn for the estate of Culloden House, and in 1746 it was used by the Jacobite army as accommodation on the night before the Battle of Culloden. During the 19th century it was used as a blacksmith's workshop, before being taken over by the East Church of Inverness as a mission station in the early 20th century. When it was granted the status of a church extension charge in the 1970s, the congregation erected a new church called "the New Barn" (designed with architectural "barn metaphors") which is joined to the old building; the historic building (the "Old Barn") today serves as the church hall. Interesting architectural features of the Old Barn include the slit windows for defensive purposes and the parallel doors which can create a wind tunnel required for winnowing.

In August 2023, a union of 3 churches (the Barn Church, Ardersier Church, and Petty Church) was formed, creating the new Culloden and Ardersier parish Church.

On 14th November 2014, Rev. Mike Robertson, was ordained and inducted as minister of the Barn Church. The previous minister, the Rev. Jim Robertson, had served for about 20 years. On the 14th June 2024 the Rev. Pamela Kennedy was inducted as the new minister of the recently united Culloden and Ardersier parish Church

== See also ==
- List of Church of Scotland parishes
- Barn Church in Kew, London, England
- Barn Church in Michigan, United States
