= John Hamilton, 1st Baron Hamilton of Dalzell =

Scottish soldier and politician

John Hamilton
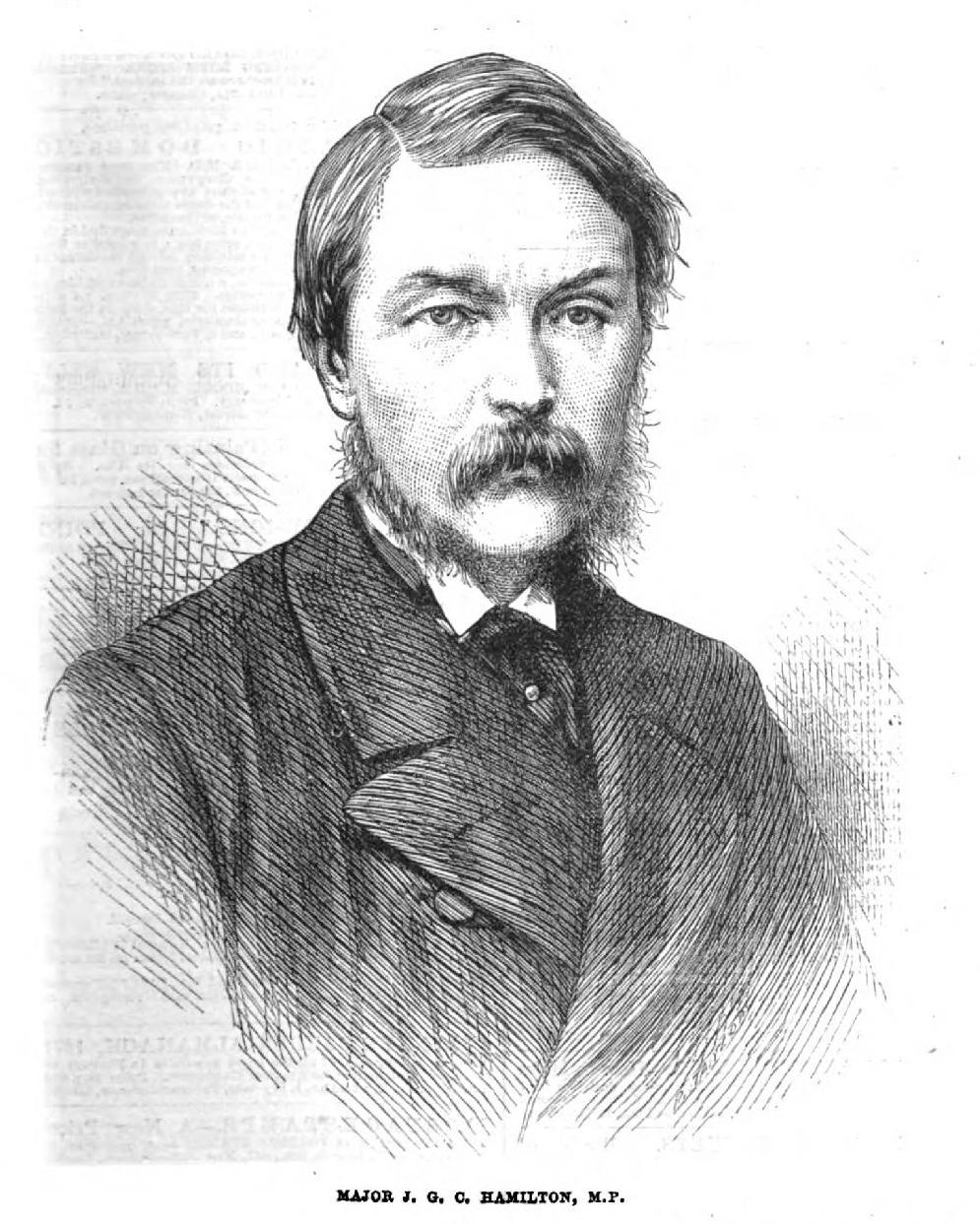

1st Baron Hamilton of Dalzell
- In office 1886–1900

Member of the British Parliament for Falkirk Burghs
- In office 1857–1859

Member of the British Parliament for Lanarkshire South
- In office 1868–1874
- In office 1880–1886

Personal details
- Born: 16 November 1829
- Died: 15 October 1900 (aged 70)
- Spouse: Emily Leslie-Melville
- Children: 4, including Gavin George Hamilton
- Parent: Archibald James Hamilton (father)

Military service
- Unit: Queen's Own Royal Glasgow and Lower Ward of Lanarkshire Yeomanry Cavalry; 2nd Life Guards

John Glencairn Carter Hamilton, 1st Baron Hamilton of Dalzell (16 November 1829 – 15 October 1900), was a Scottish soldier and politician.

Hamilton was born in Marseille, France, the only son of Archibald James Hamilton, 12th of Orbiston (1793–1834), and was educated at Eton College. He served in the 2nd Life Guards, rising to the rank of commissioned cornet in 1847, lieutenant in 1849 and captain in 1854. In 1856 he was appointed major in the Queen's Own Royal Glasgow and Lower Ward of Lanarkshire Yeomanry Cavalry. Although retiring from the regular Army in 1860, he continued to serve in the Yeomanry until 1885.

He began his political career in 1857 as Whig Member of Parliament (MP) for Falkirk Burghs, serving for two years. He later sat as a Liberal for Lanarkshire South in 1868–74 and 1880–86. He also served as a justice of the peace, and as deputy lieutenant and vice-lord lieutenant for Lanarkshire.

In 1886, Hamilton was raised to the peerage as Baron Hamilton of Dalzell. He served in William Ewart Gladstone's government as a Lord-in-waiting from 1892 to 1894.

The Hamiltons made large amounts of money in the nineteenth century, as the lands they held in Lanarkshire were sold for coal exploitation. In the late 1850s and 1860s Hamilton was able to greatly extend his home of Dalzell House, a former tower house outside Motherwell, laying out landscaped grounds at the same time.

On 29 March 1864 he married Lady Emily Leslie-Melville (died 1882), daughter of David Leslie-Melville, 8th Earl of Leven, and had issue:

1. Archibald John Hamilton (1868–1870)
2. Gavin George Hamilton (1872– 1952), later 2nd baron
3. Leslie d'Henin Hamilton (1873–1914)
4. John David Hamilton (1878–1900)

== Arms ==
Coat of arms of John Hamilton, 1st Baron Hamilton of Dalzell
Coronet A coronet of an Baron Crest An antelope proper, attired and hoofed or. Escutcheon Gules, an annulet or between three cinquefoils pierced ermine. Supporters Dexter: an antelope proper, ducally gorged and chained, the chain reflexed over the back or; Sinister: a wild man proper, wreathed about the temples and loins with laurel, and holding over the sinister shoulder a club or. Motto Quis Occursabit (Who will oppose)

Parliament of the United Kingdom
Preceded by James Merry	Member of Parliament for Falkirk Burghs; 1857–1859	Succeeded by James Merry
New constituency	Member of Parliament for Lanarkshire South; 1868–1874	Succeeded by Sir Windham Carmichael-Anstruther
Preceded by Sir Windham Carmichael-Anstruther	Member of Parliament for Lanarkshire South; 1880–1886	Succeeded by James Hozier
Political offices
Preceded by New government	Lord-in-waiting; 1892–1894	Succeeded by The Lord Hawkesbury
Peerage of the United Kingdom
New creation	Baron Hamilton of Dalzell; 1886–1900	Succeeded by Gavin George Hamilton
