= Gavin Hamilton, 2nd Baron Hamilton of Dalzell =

Scottish Liberal politician

The Right Honourable The Lord Hamilton of Dalzell KT CVO MC
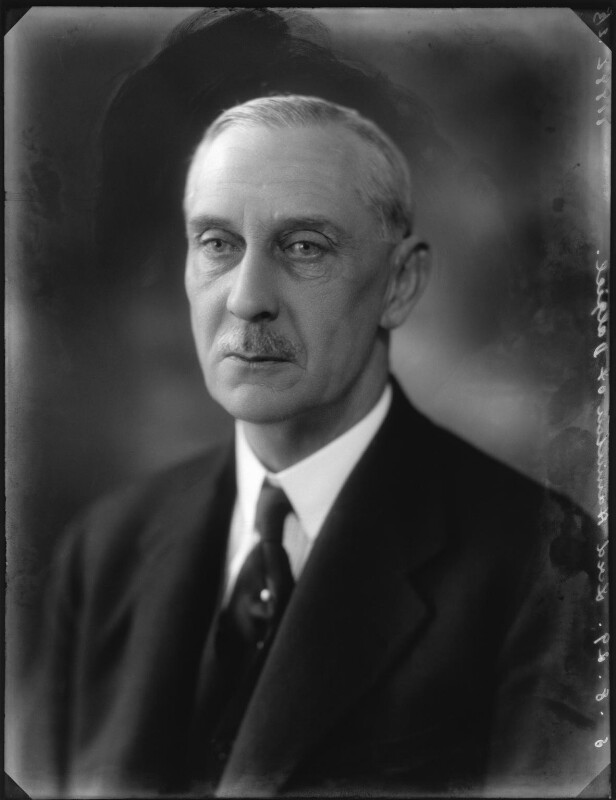
- Lord Hamilton

Member of the House of Lords
- Lord Temporal
- In office 15 October 1900 – 23 June 1952
- Preceded by: The 1st Baron Hamilton of Dalzell
- Succeeded by: The 3rd Baron Hamilton of Dalzell

Personal details
- Born: Gavin George Hamilton; 29 June 1872
- Died: 23 June 1952 (aged 79)
- Party: Liberal Party

Gavin George Hamilton, 2nd Baron Hamilton of Dalzell, KT, CVO, MC (29 June 1872 – 23 June 1952), was a Scottish Liberal politician.

Hamilton was the second but eldest surviving son of John Hamilton, 1st Baron Hamilton of Dalzell, and his wife Lady Emily Eleanor, daughter of Alexander Leslie-Melville, 10th Earl of Leven. He was educated at Eton College and later pursued a career in the military. He was commissioned a second lieutenant in the Scots Guards on 30 March 1892, and promoted to lieutenant on 20 March 1897, but resigned and was appointed to the Reserve in January 1900 with the rank of captain. He volunteered for service in the Second Boer War in South Africa the following month, and was appointed a lieutenant in the 4th Battalion Imperial Yeomanry on 17 February 1900. Attached to the 28th (Bedfordshire) company, he left Albert Docks in the SS Kent in early February 1900, and arrived at South Africa the following month, where he was Lord-in-waiting to the Prince Arthur, Duke of Connaught and Strathearn. He also became Lord-in-waiting to Edward VII between 1905 and 1910, and George V, 1910–1911.

He succeeded his father in the barony in 1900 and took his seat on the Liberal benches in the House of Lords. From 1905 to 1911 he served under Sir Henry Campbell-Bannerman and later H. H. Asquith as a Lord-in-waiting (government whip in the House of Lords).

He was appointed a Deputy Lieutenant of Lanarkshire in September 1901, and served as Lord-Lieutenant of Lanarkshire between 1938 and 1952. In 1909 he was made a Knight of the Thistle. He also received foreign awards: the Order of Alexander Nevsky from Russia, the Order of Saints Maurice and Lazarus from Italy, the Norwegian Order of St. Olav, and the Legion of Honour.

Lord Hamilton of Dalzell married Sybil Mary Marshall, daughter of Lieutenant-General Sir Frederick Marshall, in 1912. She died in 1933. Hamilton survived her by nineteen years and died in June 1952, aged 79. He was succeeded in the barony by his nephew John (1911–1990).

== Arms ==
Coat of arms of Gavin Hamilton, 2nd Baron Hamilton of Dalzell
| Coronet A coronet of an Baron Crest An antelope proper, attired and hoofed or. Escutcheon Gules, an annulet or between three cinquefoils pierced ermine. Supporters Dexter: an antelope proper, ducally gorged and chained, the chain reflexed over the back or; Sinister: a wild man proper, wreathed about the temples and loins with laurel, and holding over the sinister shoulder a club or. Motto Quis Occursabit (Who will oppose) |

Court offices
| Preceded by The Viscount Churchill | Her Majesty's Representative at Ascot; 1934–1945 | Succeeded by The Duke of Norfolk |
Honorary titles
| Preceded by Sir James Knox | Lord-Lieutenant of Lanarkshire; 1938–1952 | Succeeded by The Lord Clydesmuir |
Peerage of the United Kingdom
| Preceded by John Glencairn Carter Hamilton | Baron Hamilton of Dalzell; 1900–1952; Member of the House of Lords (1900–1952) | Succeeded by John d'Henin Hamilton |
