= Farleigh Hungerford Castle =

Medieval castle in Somerset, England

- Somerset, England
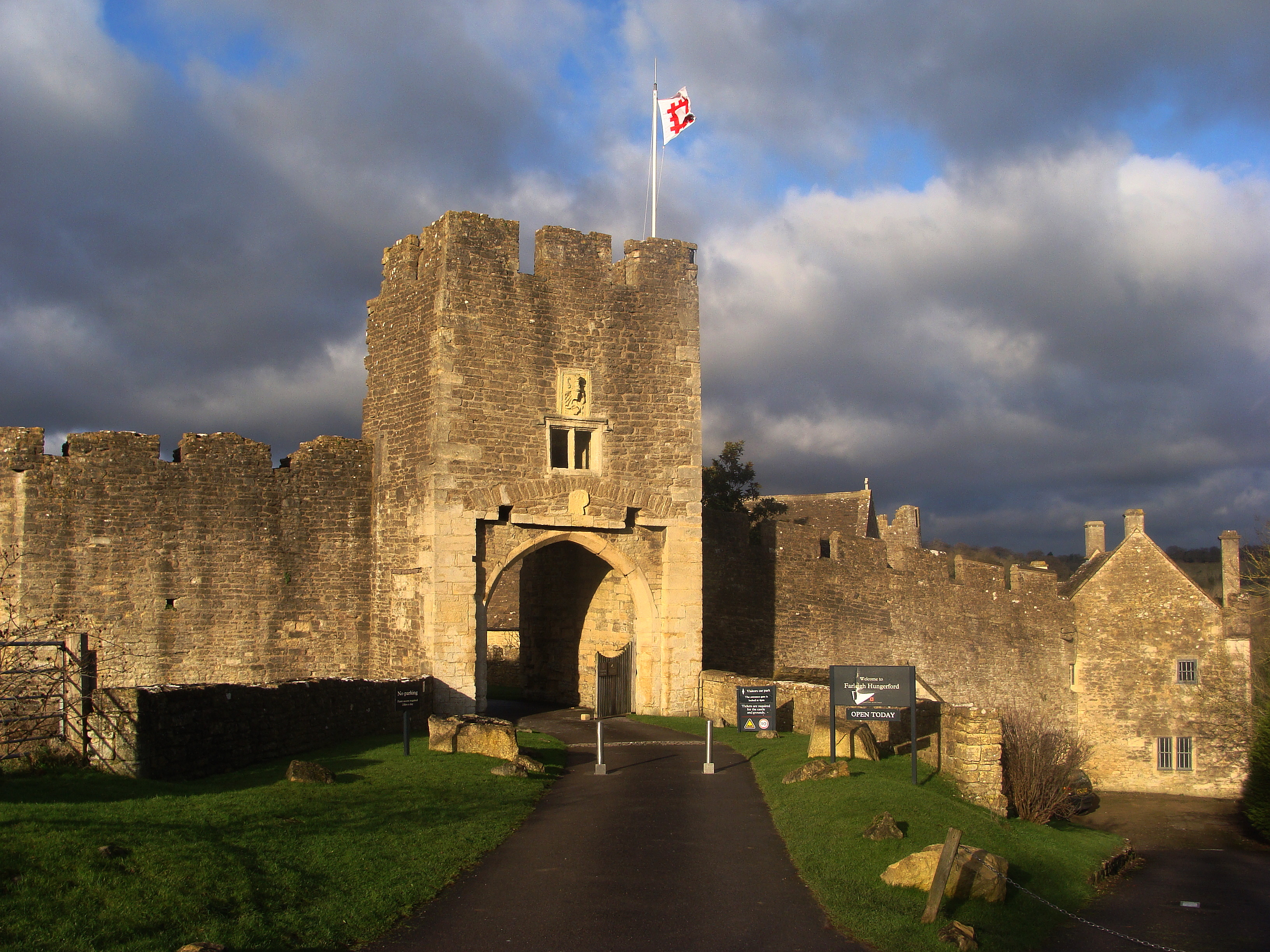
- Eastern gatehouse of Farleigh Hungerford Castle

Site information
- Type: Quadrangular
- Owner: English Heritage
- Open to the public: Yes
- Condition: Ruined

Location
- Shown within Somerset
- Location within Somerset
- Coordinates: 51.3167°N 2.287°W
- Grid reference: grid reference ST80225763

Site history
- Materials: Stone
- Events: English Civil War

Farleigh Hungerford Castle, sometimes called Farleigh Castle or Farley Castle, is a medieval castle in Farleigh Hungerford, Somerset, England. The castle was built in two phases: the inner court was constructed between 1377 and 1383 by Sir Thomas Hungerford, who made his fortune as steward to John of Gaunt. The castle was built to a quadrangular design, already slightly old-fashioned, on the site of an existing manor house overlooking the River Frome. A deer park was attached to the castle, requiring the destruction of the nearby village. Sir Thomas's son, Sir Walter Hungerford, a knight and leading courtier to Henry V, became rich during the Hundred Years War with France and extended the castle with an additional, outer court, enclosing the parish church in the process. By Walter's death in 1449, the substantial castle was richly appointed, and its chapel decorated with murals.

The castle largely remained in the hands of the Hungerford family over the next two centuries, despite periods during the War of the Roses in which it was held by the Crown following the attainder and execution of members of the family. At the outbreak of the English Civil War in 1642, the castle, modernized to the latest Tudor and Stuart fashions, was held by Sir Edward Hungerford. Edward declared his support for Parliament, becoming a leader of the Roundheads in Wiltshire. Farleigh Hungerford was seized by Royalist forces in 1643, but recaptured by Parliament without a fight near the end of the conflict in 1645. As a result, it escaped slighting following the war, unlike many other castles in the south-west of England.

The last member of the Hungerford family to hold the castle, Sir Edward Hungerford, inherited it in 1657, but his gambling and extravagance forced him to sell the property in 1686. By the 18th century, the castle was no longer lived in by its owners and fell into disrepair; in 1730 it was bought by the Houlton family, Trowbridge clothiers, when much of it was broken up for salvage. Antiquarian and tourist interest in the now ruined castle increased through the 18th and 19th centuries. The castle chapel was repaired in 1779 and became a museum of curiosities, complete with the murals rediscovered on its walls in 1844 and a number of rare lead anthropomorphic coffins from the mid-17th century. In 1915 Farleigh Hungerford Castle was sold to the Office of Works and a controversial restoration programme began. It is now owned by English Heritage, who operate it as a tourist attraction, and the castle is a Grade I listed building and a scheduled monument.

== History ==
=== 11th – 14th centuries ===
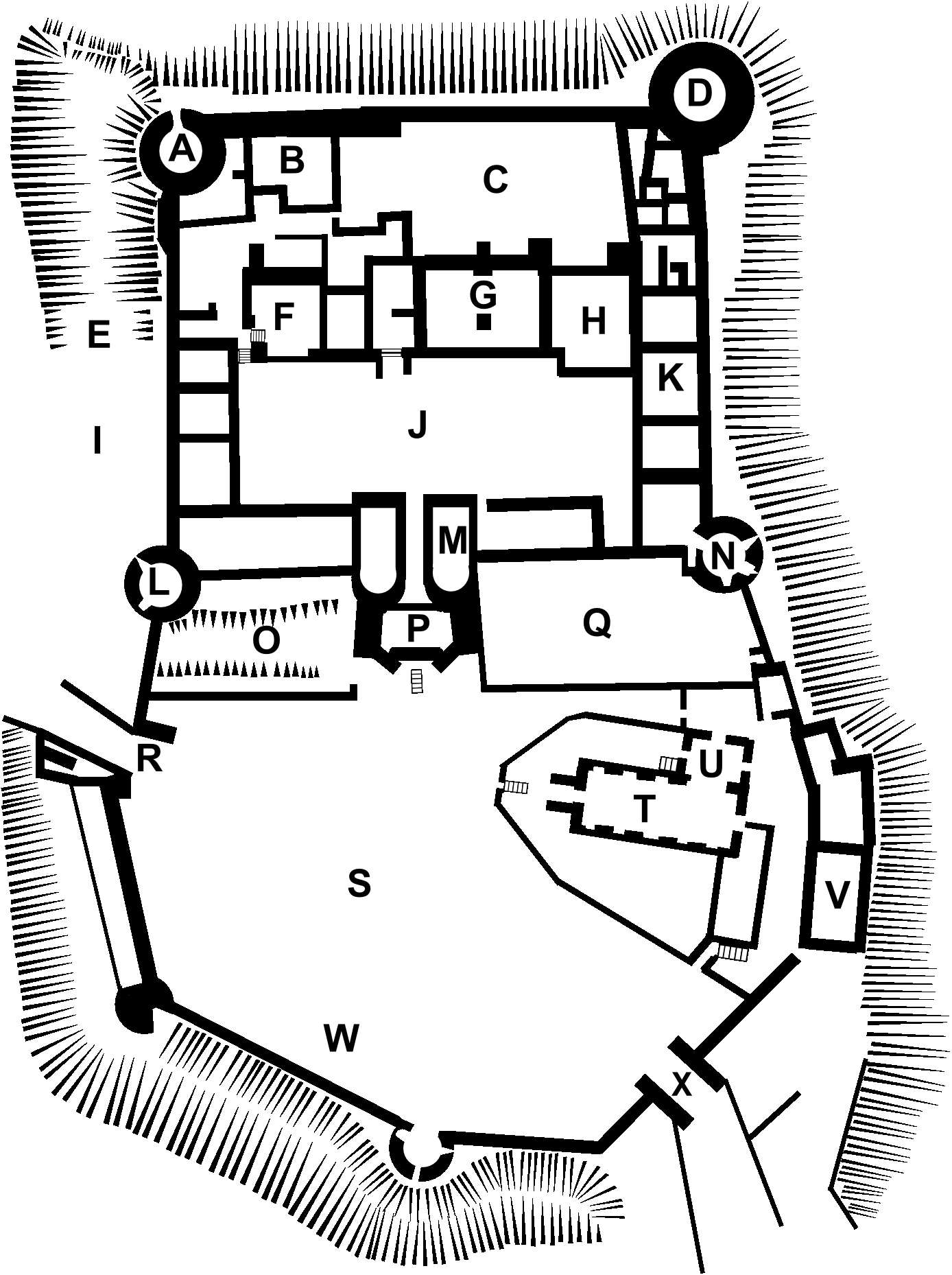
A plan of Farleigh Hungerford Castle today; A – north-west tower; B – bakehouse; C – courtyard/garden; D – north-east tower; E – dam; F – kitchens; G – great hall; H – great chamber; I – western moat; J – inner courtyard; K – east range; L – south-west tower; M – inner gatehouse; N – south-east tower; O – moat; P – barbican; Q – infilled moat; R – western gate; S – outer court; T – St Leonard's Chapel; U – St Anne's Chapel, north transept chapel; V – priest's house; W – stables; X – east gatehouse

After the Norman Conquest of England, the manor of Ferlege in Somerset was granted by William the Conqueror to Roger de Courcelles. Ferlege evolved from the Anglo-Saxon name faern-laega, meaning "the ferny pasture", and itself later evolved into Farleigh. William Rufus gave the manor to Hugh de Montfort, who renamed it Farleigh Montfort. The manor passed from the Montfort family to Bartholomew de Bunghersh in the early years of the reign of Edward III.

Sir Thomas Hungerford bought the property from the Bunghersh family in 1369 for £733. (Note: It is impossible to accurately compare 14th century and modern prices or incomes. For comparison, £733 represents rather more than the yearly income of a typical nobleman such as Richard le Scrope, whose lands brought in around £600 a year.) By 1385 the manor was known as Farley Hungerford, after its new owner. Sir Thomas Hungerford was a knight and courtier, who became rich as the Chief Steward to the powerful John of Gaunt and then the first recorded Speaker of the House of Commons. Thomas decided to make Farleigh Hungerford his principal home and, between 1377 and 1383, built a castle on the site; unfortunately he did not acquire the appropriate licence to crenellate from the king before commencing building, and Thomas had to acquire a royal pardon in 1383.

Thomas's new castle adapted the existing manor complex overlooking the head of the River Frome. Although the castle sat on a low spur it was overlooked by higher ground from the west and the north and was not ideally placed from a purely defensive perspective. Contemporary castle designs included the construction of huge, palatial tower keeps and apartments for the most powerful nobles, such as Kenilworth, expanded by Thomas's patron, John of Gaunt; or the construction of smaller, French influenced castles such as that seen at nearby Nunney Castle, built by one of Thomas's fellow nouveau riche landowners. By contrast, Farleigh Hungerford drew on the tradition of quadrangular castles that had begun in France during the early 13th century, in which the traditional buildings of an unfortified manor were enclosed by a four-sided outer wall and protected with corner towers. The style was well established by the late 14th century, even slightly old fashioned.

The castle was formed around a court, later called the inner court, enclosed by a curtain wall with a circular tower on each corner and a gatehouse at the front; the north-east tower was larger than the others, perhaps to provide additional defences. Over time the towers acquired their own names: the north-west tower was called the Hazelwell Tower; the north-east the Redcap Tower and the south-west the Lady Tower. (Note: The Hazelwell Tower's name results from a nearby spring of water; the Redcap from rumours of an evil spirit or possibly from the colour of its original roof; the "Lady" from the mistaken belief that Elizabeth Hungerford was kept there in the 1530s.) The ground fell away sharply on most sides of the castle, but its south and west sides were protected with a wet moat, using a dam fed from a nearby spring using a pipe. The gatehouse had twin towers and a drawbridge.

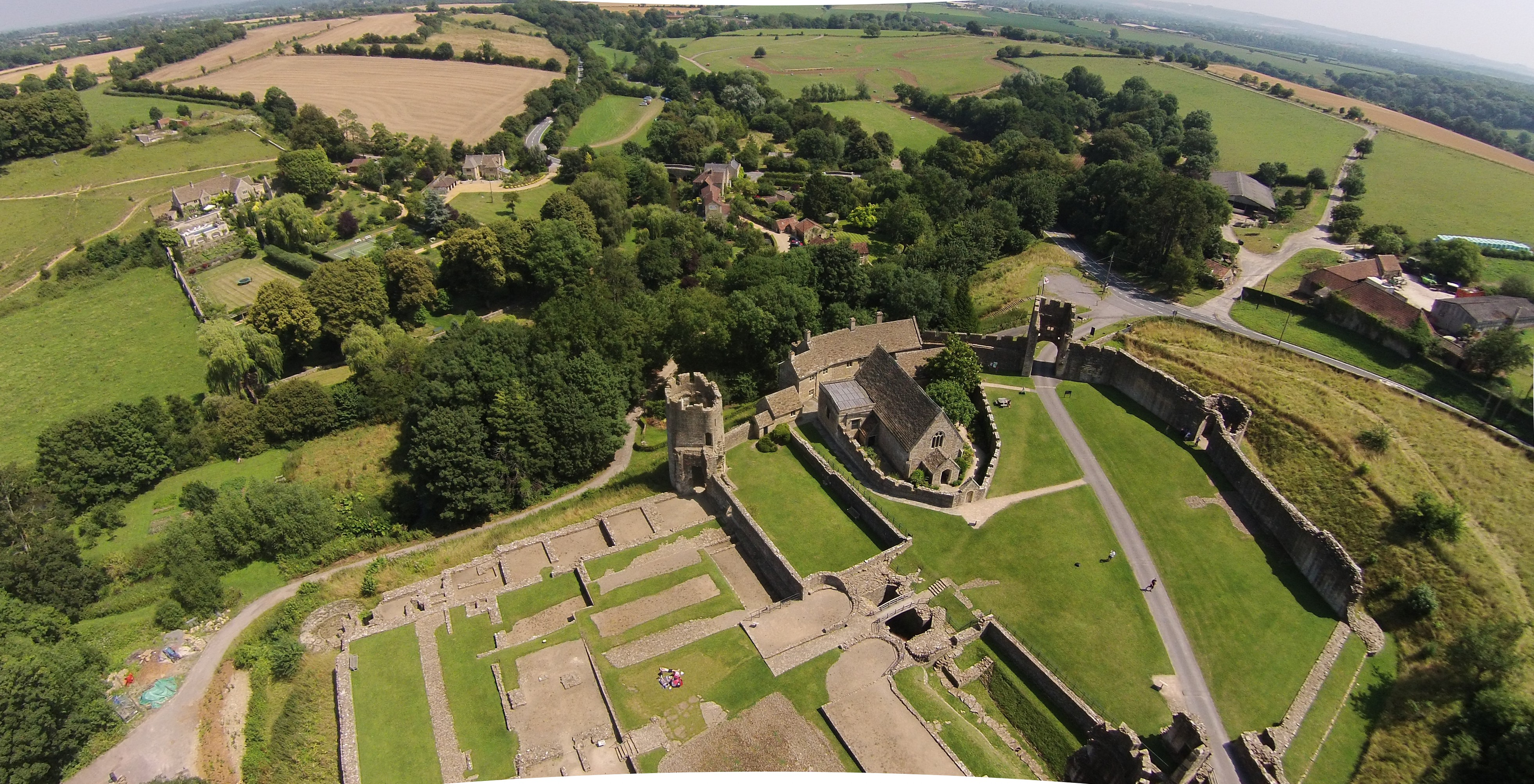
The south-east side of the castle, showing the Chapel of St Leonard (centre)

Opposite the entrance, and running across the middle of the court, was the great hall of the castle, with a grand porch and steps leading up to the first floor, where prestigious guests would have been entertained amongst carved wall-panels and murals. The design of the hall may have emulated Gaunt's hall at Kenilworth; at the very least, it was a powerful symbol of Thomas's authority and status. The west side of the inner court included the castle kitchen, bakery, well and other service facilities; on the east side was the lord's great chamber and a range of other accommodation for other guests. Behind the great hall was a smaller courtyard or garden. Thomas appears to have built up his new castle in stages, with the curtain wall being built first, with the corner towers added afterwards.

A park was established next to the castle; a park was highly prestigious and it enabled Thomas to engage in hunting, provided the castle with a supply of venison as well as generating income. Most of the village of Wittenham had to be destroyed to make way for the park and the site eventually became a deserted village. A new parish church, St Leonard's Chapel, was built by Thomas just outside the castle, after he had demolished the earlier, simpler 12th-century church during the construction of the inner court. Thomas died in 1397 and was buried in the newly built St Anne's Chapel, forming the north transept of St Leonard's Chapel.

=== 15th century ===
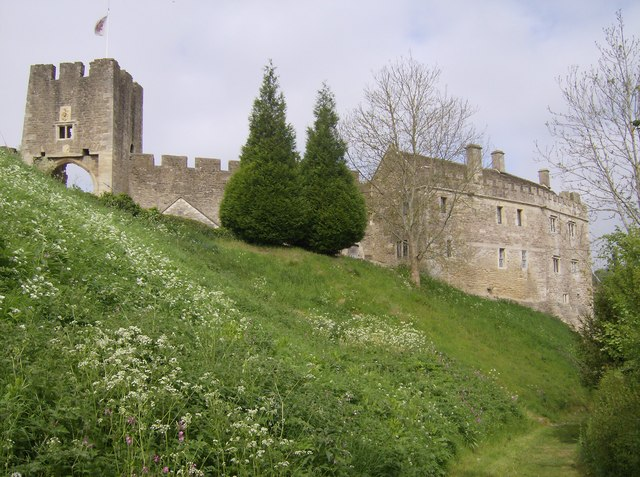
The castle from the south-east, showing the eastern gatehouse (l) and the priest's house (r)

Sir Walter Hungerford inherited Farleigh Hungerford castle upon the death of his mother, Joan, in 1412. Walter's first political patron was John of Gaunt's son, Henry IV, and later he became a close companion of Henry's own son, Henry V; Henry V made Walter, like his father before him, the Speaker of the Commons in 1414. Walter prospered: he became known as an expert jouster, in 1415 fought at the battle of Agincourt during the Hundred Years War, was made Steward of the Royal Household and was a major figure in government during the 1420s, serving as the Treasurer of England and as one of the legal guardians of the young Henry VI. Despite having to pay a ransom of £3,000 to the French after his son was captured in 1429, Walter, by now created Baron Hungerford, amassed considerable wealth from his various sources of income, which included the right to one hundred marks (£66) per year from the town of Marlborough, the wool taxes from Wells, and the ransoms gained from the taking of French prisoners. (Note: Occasionally Sir Walter Hungerford is credited with constructing the outer court on the proceeds of taking Charles, Duke of Orléans, prisoner; both Canon Jackson and Charles Kightly dispute this, Jackson noting that it was Sir Richard Waller who took Charles prisoner at the battle.) (Note: It is impossible to accurately compare 15th century and modern prices or incomes. For comparison, £3,000 represents around four times the typical average annual income for an early 15th-century baron; £66 a little less than a tenth.) As a result, he was able to buy more land, acquiring around 110 new manors and estates over the course of his life.

Between 1430 and 1445 Walter expanded the castle considerably. An outer court was built to the south side of the original castle, with its own towers and an additional gatehouse which formed the new entrance to the castle. These new defences were less strong than those of the original inner court, and indeed the eastern gatehouse was not crenellated at the time. A barbican was built, extending the older gatehouse to the inner court. The new court enclosed the parish church, which became the castle chapel, with a replacement church being built by Walter in the village. Walter had the chapel decorated with a number of murals, depicting scenes from the story of Saint George and the Dragon; Saint George was a favoured saint of Henry V, and associated with the prestigious Order of the Garter, of which Walter was a proud member. A house was built next to the chapel for the use of the chantry priest. Walter also legally combined the two parishes of Farleigh in Somerset and Wittenham in Wiltshire, which formed part of his castle's park, altering the county boundaries of Somerset and Wiltshire in the process. As a village, Wittenham disappeared completely.

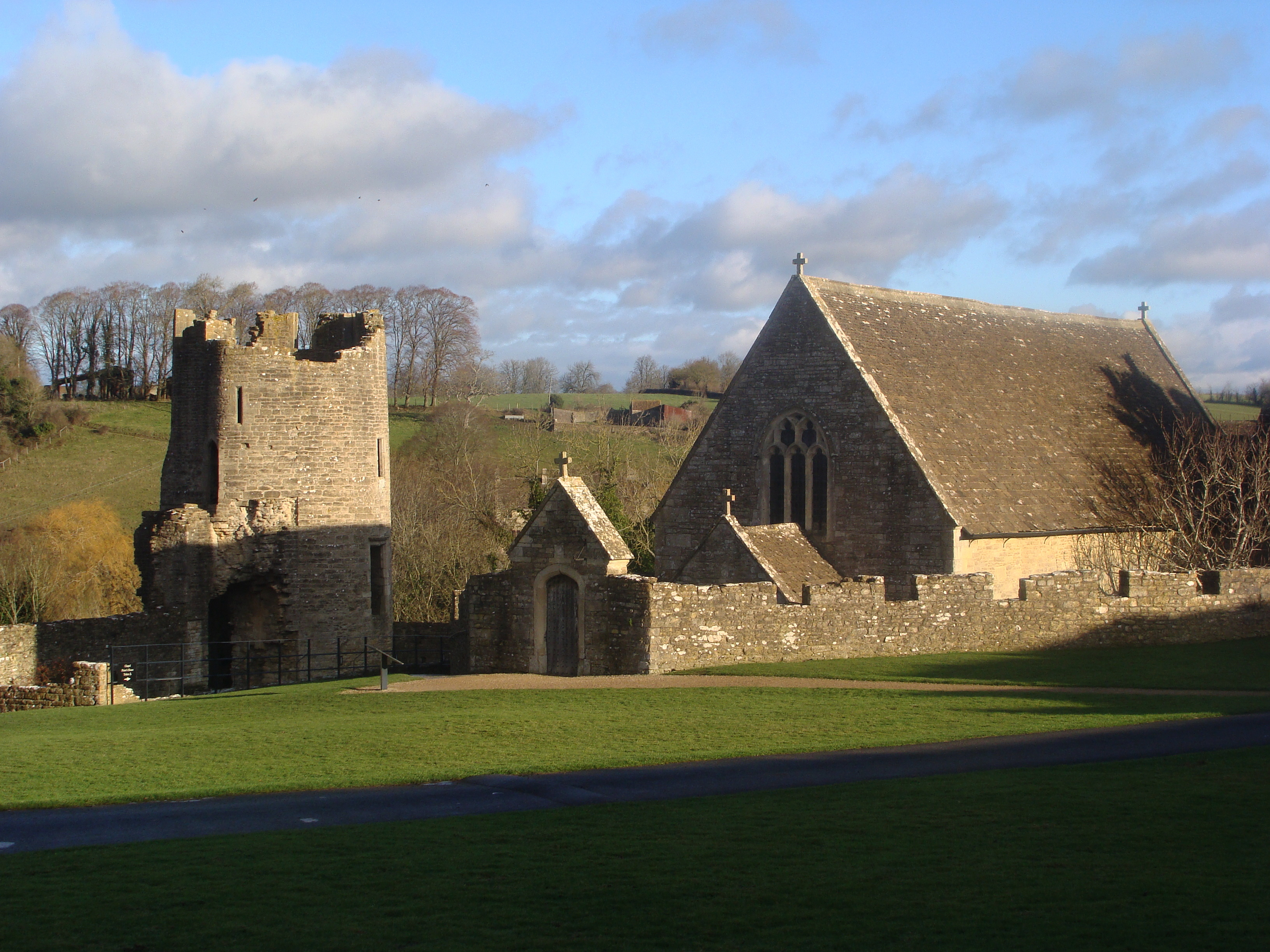
View across the outer court, showing the south-west tower (l) and St Leonard's Chapel (r)

Walter left the castle to his son, Robert Hungerford. Records of the castle at the time show considerable luxuries, including valuable tapestries up to 60 feet (18.3 m) long, silk bedclothes, rich furs and silver bowls and utensils. Unfortunately, Robert's eldest son, the later Lord Moleyns, was captured by the French at the battle of Castillon, which was fought at the end of the Hundred Years War in 1453. The huge ransom of over £10,000 required to ensure his release financially crippled the family, and Lord Moleyns did not return to England until 1459. (Note: It is impossible to accurately compare 14th century and modern prices or incomes. For comparison, £10,000 is almost as much as the £12,000 cost of building the major fortification of Bolton Castle during this period, although the latter was spread out over a twenty-year period.) By this time England had entered the period of civil conflict between the Houses of York and Lancaster known as the Wars of the Roses. Moleyns was a Lancastrian supporter and fought against the Yorkists in 1460 and 1461, leading to first his exile and then his attainder, under which Farleigh Hungerford Castle was seized by the Crown. Moleyns was captured and executed in 1464, and his eldest son, Thomas, met the same fate in 1469.

The Yorkist Edward IV gave Farleigh Hungerford Castle to his brother Richard, then Duke of Gloucester, in 1462. Edward and Richard's brother George Plantagenet may have taken up residence at the castle; his daughter Margaret was certainly born there. Richard became king in 1483 and gave the castle to John Howard, the Duke of Norfolk. Meanwhile, the late Robert's youngest son, Sir Walter, had become a close supporter of Edward IV; nonetheless, he joined the failed revolt of 1483 against Richard and ended up detained in the Tower of London. When Henry Tudor invaded England in 1485, Walter escaped custody and joined the invading Lancastrian army, fighting alongside Henry at the Battle of Bosworth. Victorious, the newly crowned Henry VII returned Farleigh Hungerford to Walter in 1486.

=== 16th century ===
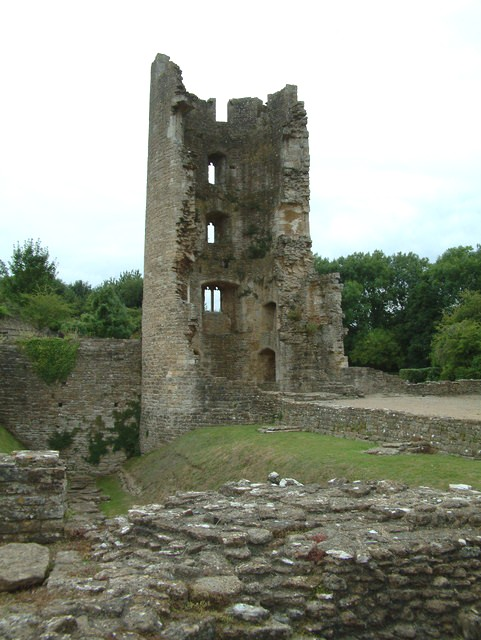
The moat (l) and south-east tower (r), the latter showing the remains of the five original floors of the building

Sir Walter Hungerford died in 1516, leaving Farleigh Hungerford Castle to his son, Sir Edward. Edward was a successful member of Henry VIII's court and died in 1522, leaving the castle to his second wife, Agnes Hungerford, Lady Hungerford. After Edward's death, however, it emerged that Agnes had been responsible for the murder of her former, first husband, John Cotell: two of her servants had strangled him at Farleigh Hungerford Castle, before burning his body in the castle oven to destroy any evidence. Agnes appears to have been motivated by a desire for the wealth that would follow her second marriage to Sir Edward, but in 1523 Agnes and the two servants were hanged for murder in London.

Due to this execution, Edward's son, another Walter, inherited the castle instead of Agnes. Walter became a political client of Thomas Cromwell, the powerful chief minister of Henry VIII, and operated on his behalf in the local region. Walter became dissatisfied with his third wife, Elizabeth, after her father became a political liability to him, and Walter detained her in one of the castle towers for several years. Elizabeth complained that while she was imprisoned she was starved in an attempt to kill her, and subjected to several poisoning attempts. She was probably kept in the north-west tower, although the south-west "Lady Tower" is named after her. When Cromwell fell from power in 1540, so did Walter, who was executed for treason, witchcraft and homosexuality: Elizabeth was allowed to remarry, but the castle reverted to the Crown.

Walter's son, also called Walter, bought back the castle from the Crown in 1554 for £5,000. (Note: It is difficult to accurately compare 16th century and modern prices or incomes. Depending on the measure used, £5,000 in 1554 could equate to either £1,180,000 (using the retail price index) or £18,900,000 (using the average earnings index). For comparison, £5,000 was around two and a half times the annual income of a wealthy knight like William Darrell who owned 25 manors.) Farleigh Hungerford Castle and the surrounding park remained in good condition — indeed, unusually for the time, the visiting antiquarian John Leland was able to praise its "praty" (pretty) and "stately" condition — but Walter continued to update the property, including adding more fashionable, Elizabethan style windows and improving the east range of the inner court, which became the main living area for the family. Walter's second wife, Jane, was a Roman Catholic and during the turbulent religious politics of the later Tudor period, their marriage collapsed, with Jane going into exile. Walter and Jane's only son died young and, after the Walter's death in 1596, the castle passed to his brother, Sir Edward.

=== 17th century ===
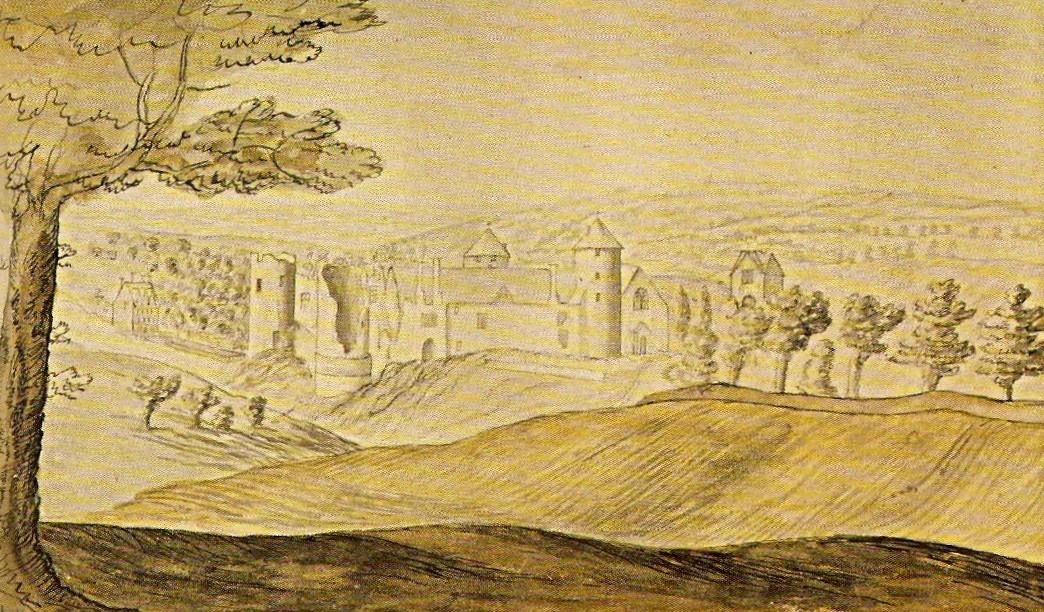
Water-colour of the castle from the south-east, around 1730

Sir Edward Hungerford died in 1607, leaving Farleigh Hungerford to his great-nephew, another Sir Edward Hungerford. Edward continued to develop the castle, installing new windows in the medieval buildings of the inner court. In 1642, however, the Civil War broke out in England between the supporters of King Charles and those of Parliament. As a reformist Member of Parliament and a Puritan, Edward was an active supporter of Parliament and volunteered himself as the leader of its forces in the neighbouring county of Wiltshire; unfortunately this put him at odds with Sir Edward Bayntun, a Wiltshire gentleman with similar ambitions. The resulting feud between the two men turned violent before Parliament finally settled the issue by appointing Hungerford as its commander in Wiltshire at the start of 1643. His military record during the conflict was unexceptional: he abandoned several towns to advancing Royalist armies and fought on the losing side at the battle of Roundway Down, although he did successfully seize Wardour Castle in 1643.

Farleigh Hungerford Castle was captured by a Royalist unit in 1643, following a successful campaign by the King's forces across the south-west. The castle was taken without a fight by Colonel John Hungerford, a half-brother of Edward, who installed a garrison that then supported itself by pillaging the surrounding countryside. Several Parliamentary raids against Farleigh Hungerford were undertaken during 1644, but they failed to take back the castle. By 1645, however, the Royalist cause was close to military collapse; Parliamentary forces began to mop up the remaining Royalist garrisons in the south-west, and on 15 September they reached the castle. Colonel Hungerford immediately surrendered on good terms, and Sir Edward Hungerford peacefully reinstalled himself in the undamaged castle. As a result of this process, the castle escaped being slighted, or deliberately destroyed, by Parliament, unlike many other castles in the region, such as Nunney.

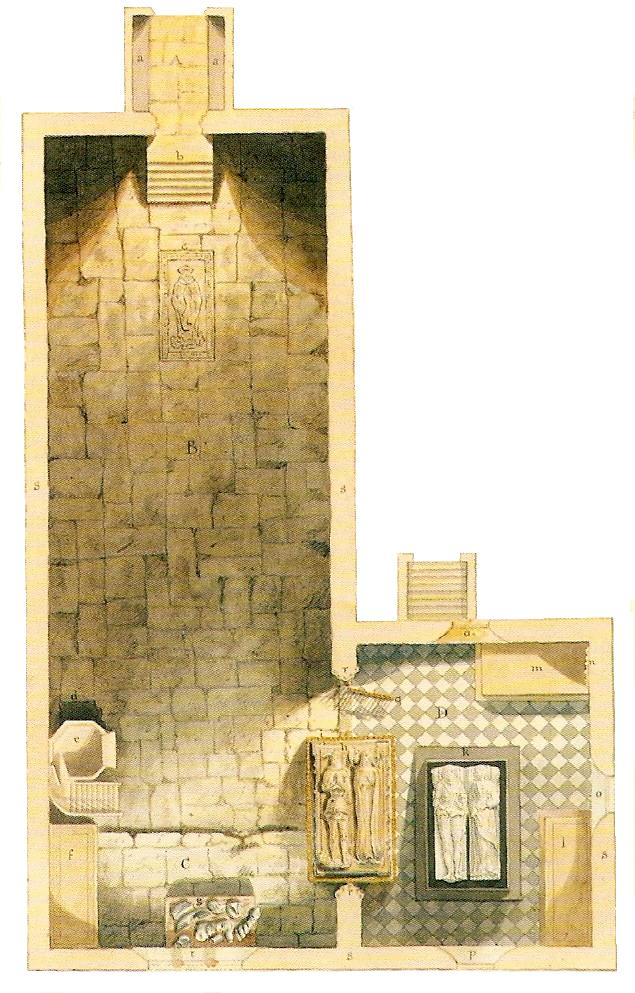
Plan of the chapel (l) and north chapel (r), around 1800

On Edward's death in 1648, Anthony Hungerford, his half-brother, inherited the castle. The north chapel was extensively renovated during this period by Edward's widow, Margaret Hungerford, who covered the walls with pictures of saints, cherubs, clouds, ribbons, crowns and heraldry, as part of an elaborate tomb for her and Edward which cost £1,100 (£136,000 in 2009 terms). The renovation effectively blocked most of the access into the north chapel, making the new tomb the focus of attention for any visitor or religious activity. A number of lead, anthropomorphic coffins, some with moulded faces or death masks, were laid down in the crypt in the mid- to late-17th century. Four men, two women and two children were embalmed in the castle in this way, probably including Edward and Margaret, as well as the final Sir Edward Hungerford, his wife, son and daughter-in-law. Such lead coffins were extremely expensive during the period and reserved for the wealthiest in society. Originally the lead coffins would have been encased in wood, but this outer casing has since been lost.

Anthony passed on both the castle and a considerable fortune to his son, yet another Sir Edward Hungerford, in 1657. After his marriage, Edward enjoyed an income of around £8,000 (£1,110,000) a year, making him a very wealthy man. Edward lived a lavish lifestyle, however, including giving a huge gift of money to the exiled Charles II shortly before his restoration to the throne, and later entertaining the royal court at Farleigh Hungerford Castle in 1673. Edward later fell out with the king over the proposal that the Roman Catholic James II should succeed to the throne on Charles's death, and after the discovery of the Rye House Plot in 1683 the castle was searched by royal officials looking for stocks of weapons that might be used in a possible revolt.

Meanwhile, Edward had been living a truly extravagant lifestyle, including extensive gambling, resulting in his running up debts of some £40,000, which in 1683 forced him to sell many of his estates in Wiltshire. Over the next two years, Edward incurred further debts of around £38,000 (£5,270,000) and in 1686 was finally forced to sell his remaining lands in the south-west, including Farleigh Hungerford Castle, to Sir Henry Bayntun, who purchased them for £56,000 (£7,750,000). Bayntun lived in the castle for a few years, until his death in 1691.

=== 18th – 20th centuries ===
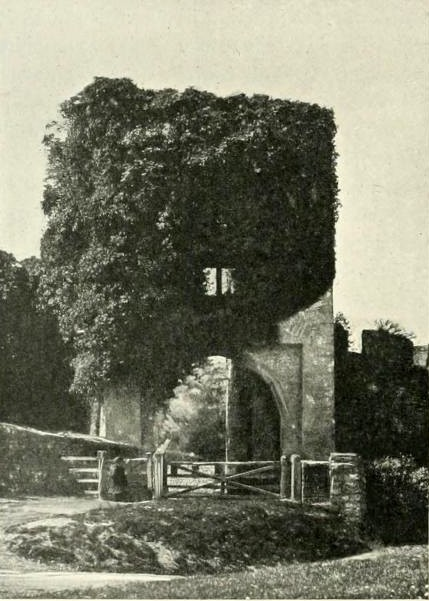
The ivy-covered eastern gatehouse, before 20th-century restoration

From the 18th century onwards, Farleigh Hungerford Castle slipped into decline. In 1702, the castle was sold on to Hector Cooper, who lived in Trowbridge; in 1730 it was passed in turn to the Houlton family, who had purchased the estates surrounding the castle. The Houlton family broke up castle's stone walls and the internal contents for salvage. Some of the parts, such as the marble floors, were reused at Longleat or in the Houlton's new house, Farleigh House, built nearby in the 1730s; other elements were reused by local villagers. By the end of the 1730s the castle was ruinous and, although the castle chapel was repaired and brought back into use in 1779, the north-west and north-east towers had both collapsed by the end of 1797. The outer court became a farm yard, with the priest's house becoming the farm house. The castle's park was reassigned to serve Farleigh House instead. (Note: Kightly suggests that the castle was sold to the Houlton family in 1705, rather than 1730; Jackson disagrees.)

Antiquarian curiosity in the castle had begun as early as 1700, when Peter Le Neve visited and recorded some of the architectural details, but interest increased in the 19th century. This was partially due to the work of the local curate, the Reverend J. Jackson, who undertook the first archaeological excavations at the site during the 1840s, uncovering many of the foundations of the inner court. 17th and 18th century stained glass windows from the continent were installed in the chapel, where the 15th century wall paintings were rediscovered in 1844. The then owner, Colonel John Houlton, turned the chapel into a museum of curiosities, where for a small fee visitors could see sets of armour, what was said to be a pair of Oliver Cromwell's boots and other English Civil War artefacts, including letters from Cromwell written to the Hungerfords.

The foundations that Jackson discovered during the excavations were left exposed for the benefit of visitors and larger numbers of tourists began to come to the castle to see the ruins, including Louis-Napoléon Bonaparte in 1846. The lead coffins in the chapel crypt were popular with tourists, although the coffins were extensively damaged by those visitors keen to see the contents inside. The south-west tower, completely covered by thick ivy, collapsed in 1842, after local children accidentally set fire to the vegetation that was, by then, holding the tower together. Battlements were added to the east gatehouse during this period, transforming the appearance of its original gabled roof.

In 1891, most of Farleigh Hungerford Castle was sold by the Houlton family to Lord Donington, whose heir in turn sold it onto Lord Cairns in 1907. Cairns passed the castle to the Office of Works in 1915, by which time it was almost all heavily overgrown with ivy. The Office of Works began a process of controversial restoration work, removing the ivy and repairing the stone work; the result was critiqued by H. Avray Tipping at the time as "giving the whole castle the effect of a new concrete building". Further excavations took place in 1924 as part of the project, which retained the castle as a tourist attraction. The last inhabitants of the farmhouse left in 1959, when the last parts of the outer court were sold to the government and restored. Attempts were made to preserve the wall paintings in the chapel during 1931 and 1955, but the treatments, which involved the use of red wax, stained the paintings and caused considerable damage: the wax was removed in the 1970s. Further excavations followed around the chapel and the priest's house in 1962 and 1968. English Heritage took over responsibility for running the castle in 1983.

=== 21st century ===
Aerial video showing the layout of the ruins

Today, most of Farleigh Hungerford Castle is ruined. In the inner court only the exposed foundations remain of most of the castle buildings, along with the shells of the south-west and south-east towers. Unusually for English castles, the outer court has survived better than the inner. The restored eastern gatehouse is carved with the badge of the Hungerfords and the initials of the first Sir Edward Hungerford, who had them carved there between 1516 and 1522. The priest's house remains intact, measuring 39 feet (11.9 m) by 22 feet (6.7 m) with two rooms on the ground floor and four rooms above.

In Saint Leonard's Chapel, the outlines of many of the medieval murals can still be made out, with the painting of Saint George and Dragon still in particularly good condition; historian Simon Roffey describes this work, one of only four such surviving works in England, as "remarkable". The late 17th century tombs of the Hungerfords remain intact in the north transept chapel dedicated to Saint Anne. The surviving lead anthropomorphic coffins in the crypt are archaeologically significant: although numerous in the late 16th and 17th centuries, few lead coffins survive today, and the chapel has what historian Charles Kightly considers "the best collection" in the country.

The castle site is run by English Heritage as a tourist attraction. It is a Scheduled Monument, and the castle and chapel are Grade I listed buildings.

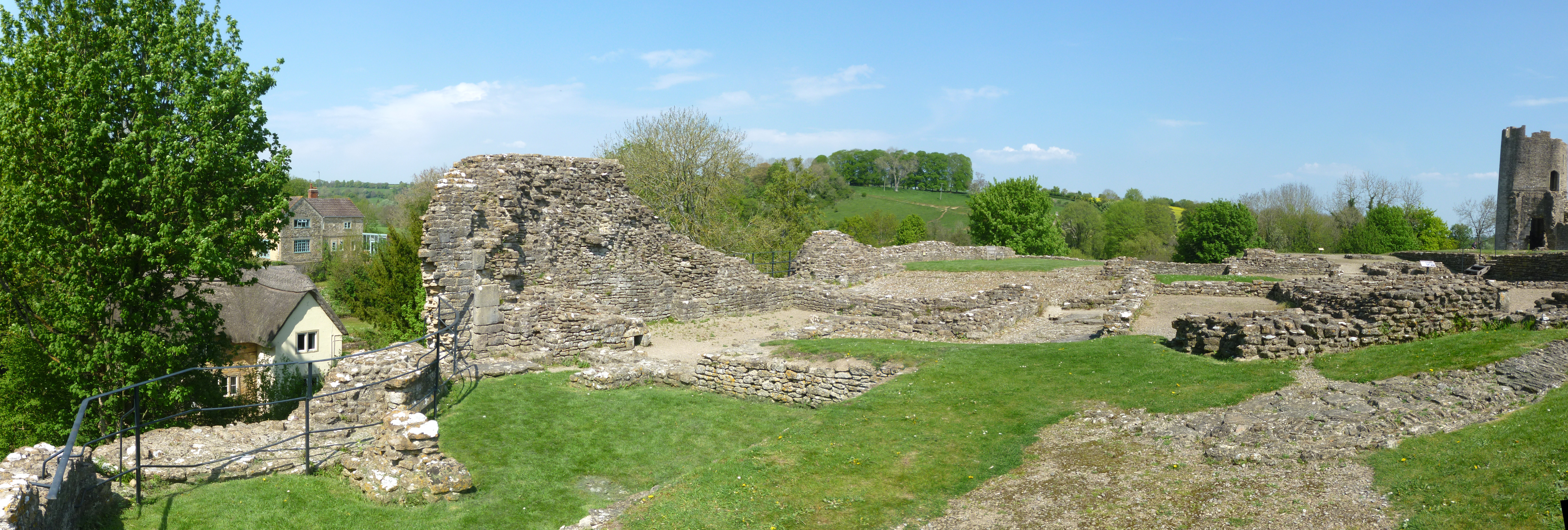
View across the inner court, showing the remains of (l to r) the west range, the bakehouse, the kitchen and the great hall

== See also ==
- Castles in Great Britain and Ireland
- List of castles in England
- List of castles in Somerset
- Grade I listed buildings in Mendip

== Bibliography ==
- Aston, M. (ed) (1998) Aspects of the Mediaeval Landscape of Somerset and Contributions to the Landscape History of the County. Taunton, UK: Somerset County Council. ISBN 978-0-86183-129-6.
- Bettey, Joseph. (1998) "From the Norman Conquest to the Reformation", in Aston (ed) (1998).
- Bull, Henry. (1859) A History, Military and Municipal, of the Ancient Borough of Devizes. London: Longman. OCLC 23280770.
- Creighton, Oliver Hamilton. (2005) Castles and Landscapes: Power, Community and Fortification in Medieval England. London: Equinox. ISBN 978-1-904768-67-8.
- Creighton, Oliver Hamilton and Robert Higham. (2003) Medieval Castles. Princes Risborough, UK: Shire Publications. ISBN 978-0-7478-0546-5.
- Cruickshanks, Eveline and Stuart Handley (eds) (2002) The House of Commons: 1690–1715. Cambridge: Cambridge University Press. ISBN 978-0-521-77221-1.
- Emery, Anthony. (2006) Greater Medieval Houses of England and Wales, 1300–1500: Southern England. Cambridge: Cambridge University Press. ISBN 978-0-521-58132-5.
- Given-Wilson, Chris. (1996) The English Nobility in the Late Middle Ages. London: Routledge. ISBN 978-0-203-44126-8.
- Gondoin, Stéphane W. (2005) Châteaux-Forts: Assiéger et Fortifier au Moyen Âge. Paris: Cheminements. ISBN 978-2-84478-395-0. (in French)
- Hall, Hubert. (2003) Society in the Elizabethan Age. Whitefish, US: Kessinger Publishing. ISBN 978-0-7661-3974-9.
- Hayton, D. W. and Henry Lancaster. (2002) "Sir Edward Hungerford", in Cruickshanks and Handley (eds) (2002).
- Jackson, J. E. (1851) "Farleigh Hungerford Castle, Somerset", Proceedings of Somerset Archaeology 1–3 pp. 114–124.
- Kightly, Charles. (2006) Farleigh Hungerford Castle. London: English Heritage. ISBN 1-85074-997-3.
- Mackenzie, James D. (1896) The Castles of England: Their Story and Structure, Vol II. New York: Macmillan. OCLC 504892038.
- Miles, T. J and A. D. Saunders. (1975) "The Chantry House at Farleigh Hungerford Castle", Medieval Archaeology 19, pp. 165–94.
- Murphy, Ignatius Ingoldsby. (1891) Life of Colonel Daniel E. Hungerford. Hartford, US: Case, Lockwood and Brainard. OCLC 10269342.
- Pettifer, Adrian. (2002) English Castles: a Guide by Counties. Woodbridge, UK: Boydell Press. ISBN 978-0-85115-782-5.
- Pounds, Norman John Greville. (1994) The Medieval Castle in England and Wales: a Social and Political History. Cambridge: Cambridge University Press. ISBN 978-0-521-45828-3.
- Roffey, Simon. (2007) The Medieval Chantry Chapel: an Archaeology. Woodbridge, UK: Boydell Press. ISBN 978-1-84383-334-5.
- Tarlow, Sarah. (2011) Ritual, Belief and the Dead in Early Modern Britain and Ireland. Cambridge: Cambridge University Press. ISBN 978-0-521-76154-3.
- Wade, G. W. and J. H. Wade. (1929) Somerset. London: Methuen. OCLC 601718264.
- Wilcox, Ronald. (1981). "Excavations at Farleigh Hungerford Castle, Somerset, 1973-6", Proceedings of Somerset Archaeology 124, pp. 87–109.
