= Matthew Blakiston (disambiguation) =

Matthew Blakiston (c.1702–1774) was a British merchant.

Matthew Blakiston may also refer to:

- Sir Matthew Blakiston, 2nd Baronet (1761–1806), of the Blakiston baronets
- Sir Matthew Blakiston, 3rd Baronet (1783–1862), of the Blakiston baronets
- Sir Matthew Blakiston, 4th Baronet (1811–1883), of the Blakiston baronets

== See also ==
- Blakiston (disambiguation)
