= Blakiston (surname) =

Blakiston is a surname. Notable people with the surname include:

- Arthur Blakiston (1892–1974), English rugby union footballer and baronet
- Bob Blakiston (1855–1918), American baseball player
- Caroline Blakiston (born 1933), British actress
- Charles Blakiston (1825–1898), New Zealand politician
- Clarence Blakiston (1864–1943), British film and stage actor
- E. F. Blakiston (1819–1879), British novelist
- Herbert Edward Douglas Blakiston (1862–1942), English academic and cleric
- Jarred Blakiston (born 1991), New Zealand actor and writer
- John Blakiston (c.1603–1649), English politician and regicide
- J. F. Blakiston (1882–1965), British archaeologist in India
- John Blakiston-Houston (1829–1920), Irish politician
- John Blakiston-Houston (British Army officer) (1881–1959), British Army officer
- Lachlan Blakiston (born 1998), Australian rules footballer
- Marmaduke Blakiston, 17th-century English Anglican priest
- Matthew Blakiston (c.1702–1774), British merchant and Lord Mayor of London
- Nathaniel Blakiston, Governor of Maryland from 1698 to 1702
- Nehemiah Blakiston, Governor of Maryland from 1691 to 1692
- Thomas Blakiston (1832–1891), British zoologist

== See also ==
- Blakiston baronets
- Oswell Blakeston, pseudonym of Henry Joseph Hasslacher (1907–1985), writer, artist and poet
- William J. Blakistone (died 1882), American politician and lawyer
