= Walter Hungerford of Farleigh =

Sir Walter Hungerford of Farleigh (died in 1516) fought for Henry VII at the Battle of Bosworth. He served on the Privy Council for both Henry VII and Henry VIII.

== Biography ==
Walter Hungerford was the youngest son of Robert Hungerford, 3rd Baron Hungerford and Eleanor. He was M.P. for Wiltshire in 1477–78, and, as a partisan in earlier days of the House of Lancaster, obtained a general pardon from Richard III on his accession in 1483. He was, nevertheless, arrested by Richard on the landing of the Earl of Richmond in 1485, but escaped from custody, and joined Richmond's army. At the Battle of Bosworth he killed, in hand-to-hand combat, Sir Robert Brackenbury, lieutenant of the Tower of London, under whose command he had previously served, and was knighted by Henry VII on the battlefield.

Farleigh Castle and some other of the forfeited family estates, though not the family honours, were restored to him, and he was made a member of the Privy Council. In February 1487 he was sent on a diplomatic mission to Rome, and executed a will before his departure (Materials for the Reign of Henry VII, Rolls Ser. ii. 122–4). In 1497 he assisted in quelling Perkin Warbeck's rising. In 1503 he went in the retinue of Henry VII's queen to attend the marriage of the Princess Margaret with the king of Scotland. After the accession of Henry VIII he continued to serve as a member of the privy council.

== Marriage and children ==
He married Jane Bulstrode, daughter of Sir William Bulstrode, and they had children including:

- Edward Hungerford, his only son, the father of Walter Hungerford, 1st Baron Hungerford of Heytesbury (1503–1540).
- Elizabeth (or Isabel) Hungerford, who became the 1st wife of John Bourchier, 2nd Earl of Bath (1499-1560/61).

== Death and burial ==
Sir Walter Hungerford died in 1516 and was buried at Farleigh.
