= Courtier =

Person in attendance of a royal court

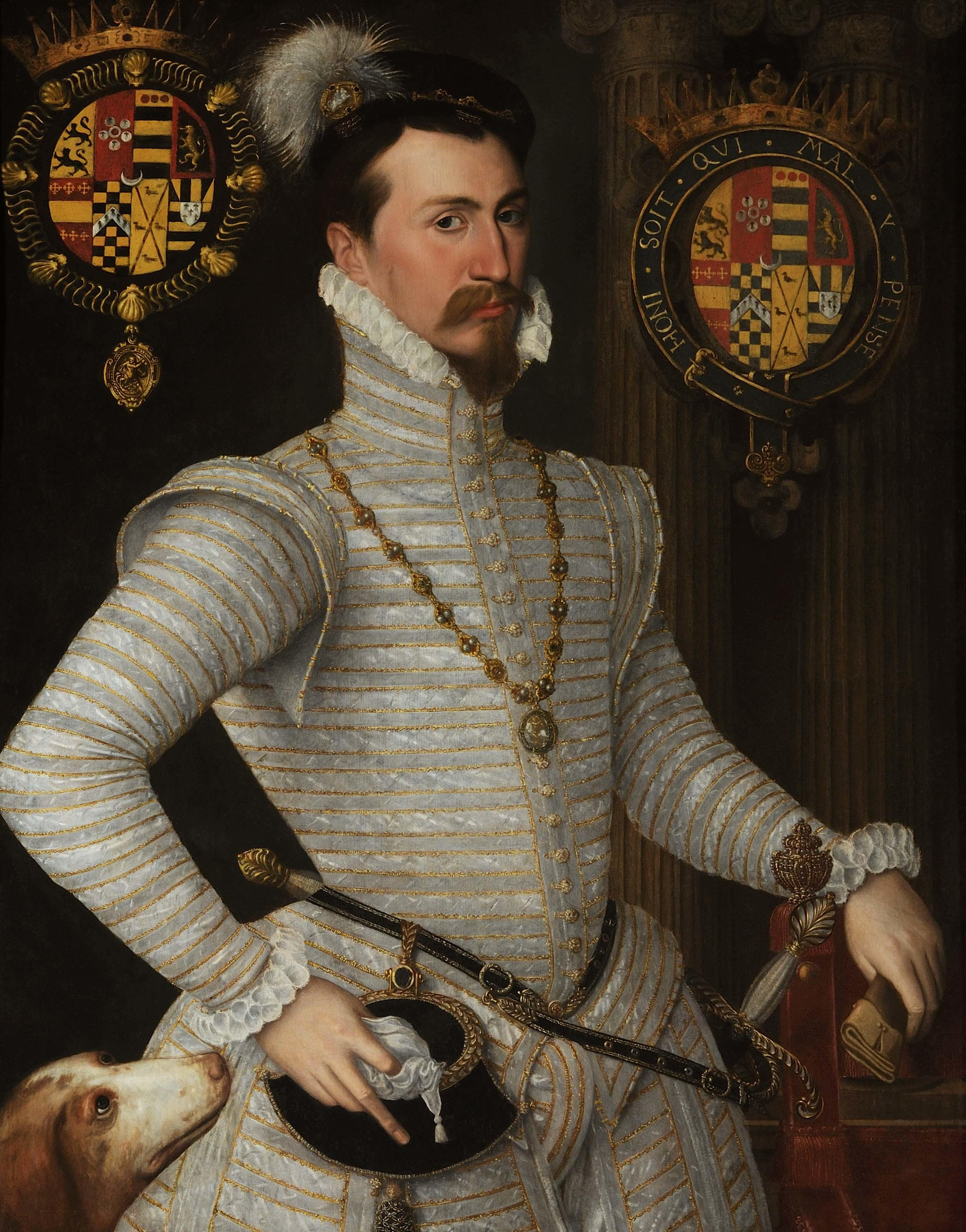
Robert Dudley, 1st Earl of Leicester was a courtier favoured by Elizabeth I.

A courtier (/ˈkɔːrtiər/) is a person who attends the royal court of a monarch or other royalty. The earliest historical examples of courtiers were part of the retinues of rulers. Historically, the court was the centre of government as well as the official residence of the monarch, and the social and political life were often completely mixed together.

== Background ==
Monarchs very often expected the more important nobles to spend much of the year in attendance on them at court. Not all courtiers were noble, as they included clergy, soldiers, clerks, secretaries, agents and middlemen with business at court. All those who held a court appointment could be called courtiers but not all courtiers held positions at court. Those personal favourites without business around the monarch, sometimes called the camarilla, were also considered courtiers. As social divisions became more rigid, a divide, barely present in Antiquity or the Middle Ages, opened between menial servants and other classes at court, although Alexandre Bontemps, the head valet de chambre of Louis XIV, was a late example of a "menial" who managed to establish his family in the nobility. The key commodities for a courtier were access and information, and a large court operated at many levels: many successful careers at court involved no direct contact with the monarch.

The largest and most famous European court was that of the Palace of Versailles at its peak, although the Forbidden City of Beijing was even larger and more isolated from national life. Very similar features marked the courts of all very large monarchies, including in India, Topkapı Palace in Istanbul, Ancient Rome, Byzantium or the Caliphs of Baghdad or Cairo. Early medieval European courts frequently travelled from place to place following the monarch as they travelled. This was particularly the case in the early French court. But, the European nobility generally had independent power and was less controlled by the monarch until around the 18th century, which gave European court life greater complexity.

== History ==
The earliest courtiers coincide with the development of definable courts beyond the rudimentary entourages or retinues of rulers. There were probably courtiers in the courts of the Akkadian Empire, where there is evidence of court appointments such as that of cup-bearer, which was one of the earliest court appointments and remained a position at courts for thousands of years. Two of the earliest titles referring to the general concept of a courtier were likely the ša rēsi and mazzāz pāni of the Neo-Assyrian Empire. In Ancient Egypt a title has been found that translates to high steward or great overseer of the house.

The courts influenced by the court of the Neo-Assyrian Empire, such as those of the Median Empire and the Achaemenid Empire, had numerous courtiers. After invading the Achaemenid Empire, Alexander the Great returned with the concept of the complex court featuring a variety of courtiers to the Kingdom of Macedonia and Hellenistic Greece.

The imperial court of the Byzantine Empire at Constantinople would eventually contain at least a thousand courtiers. The court's systems became prevalent in other courts such as those in the Balkan states, the Ottoman Empire and Russia. Byzantinism is a term that was coined for this spread of the Byzantine system in the 19th century.

== Examples ==
- Bagoas
- Anne Boleyn
- Alessandro Cagliostro
- John Dee
- Robert Dudley, 1st Earl of Leicester
- Anne Hungerford
- Princess de Lamballe
- Dukes of Luynes
- Henri Coiffier de Ruzé, Marquis of Cinq-Mars
- Louis de Rouvroy, duc de Saint-Simon
- Count of St. Germain
- Cardinal de Rohan
- Ja'far ibn Yahya
- Madame de Pompadour
- Petronius
- Walter Raleigh
- Cardinal Richelieu
- James Scudamore
- Angelo Soliman
- Wei Zhongxian

In modern English, the term is often used metaphorically for contemporary political favourites or hangers-on.

== In literature ==
In modern literature, courtiers are often depicted as insincere, skilled at flattery and intrigue, ambitious and lacking regard for the national interest. More positive representations include the role played by members of the court in the development of politeness and the arts.

Examples of courtiers in fiction:

- Rosencrantz and Guildenstern from William Shakespeare's Hamlet.
- Sir Lancelot from Arthurian legend,
- Gríma Wormtongue from J. R. R. Tolkien's The Lord of the Rings.
- Count Hasimir Fenring and Gaius Helen Mohiam from Frank Herbert's Dune.
- Petyr Baelish and Varys from George R. R. Martin's A Song of Ice and Fire.

== See also ==
- The Book of the Courtier, by Baldassare Castiglione
- Camarilla
- Courtesan
- Éminence grise
- Royal mistress
- Sycophant
- Courtly love
