= Blakiston =

Blakiston may refer to:

- Blakiston (surname)
- Blakiston baronets
- Blakiston, South Australia, a small town in South Australia, Australia
- Mount Blakiston, Alberta, Canada, named after Thomas Blakiston (1832–1891)
- Blakiston, an American medical publisher, later acquired by McGraw-Hill

== See also ==
- Blakistons, an Australian haulage and warehousing company
