= Baron St Maur =

Arms of St Maur, Barons St Maur: Argent, two chevrons gules

Arms of St Maur of North Molton, Devon: Argent, two chevrons gules a label of three points vert, as quartered by Zouche of Haryngworth

Arms of la Zouche, Baron Zouche of Haryngworth and Baron St Maur: Gules, ten bezants 4, 3, 2, 1, a canton ermine

Baron St Maur was a barony created by writ in 1314 for the soldier Nicholas de St Maur (died 1316), of Rode in Somerset.

== Ancestry ==
The descent of the "baronial" St Maur family (which should be distinguished from the apparently unrelated "Seymour" (anciently "de St Maur") family of which was Queen Jane Seymour) is given as follows by Wilhelmina, Duchess of Cleveland in her Battle Abbey Roll (1889):

== Per the Duchess of Cleveland ==
Wido de St Maur, lord of the manor of St Maur, near Avranches, in Normandy, came to England 1066, and was deceased before 1086, when William FitzWido his son held a barony in Somerset, Wiltshire and Gloucester, and ten manors in Somersetshire (of which Portishead was one) (sic, actually held by "William of Monceaux") from Geoffrey Bishop of Coutances. He made conquests in Wales c. 1090, which his family afterwards held. He had children:

1. Peter de St. Maur, who granted Portishead to the Hospitallers (Mon. ii. 530) and was ancestor of the Lords St. Maur, barons by writ 1314, who bore Argent, two chevrons gules;
2. Richard FitzWilliam, who inherited the Welsh barony and tempore King Stephen granted four churches in Wales to Kidwelly Abbey (Mon. i. 425). This marcher barony was re-conquered soon after by the Welsh. His son Thomas de St. Maur held three knight's. fees from Humphrey de Bohun in Wilts (Liber Niger), and had issue Bartholomew, who witnessed the charter of Keynsham Abbey, c. 1170 (Mon. ii. 298).

== Other landholdings ==
The Somerset historian Collinson stated William FitzWido as the Domesday Book holder of the Somerset manor of Horsington in Somerset, and two vills namely Cheriton and Combe, the last of which was given by a member of his family to the Knights Templar who made of it a cell. William FitzWido also held the Gloucestershire manor of Dyrham.

In the Church of St Lawrence at Rode no trace remain of the St Maur family, although in the eastern corner of the south aisle survives a deeply recessed wall tomb, inside which local tradition has it that the remains of one of the St Maur family was buried.

== Descent ==
=== Ancestry ===
- Milo de St Maur, who fought in the Barons' Wars during the reign of King John (1199–1216).
- Geffrey de St Maur, who married the daughter and heiress of William de Rughdon.
- Laurence de St Maur (died 1282), of Rode, Somerset, who in 1282 had obtained from King Edward I a grant of a weekly market at Rode.

=== Barons by writ ===
- Nicholas de St Maur, 1st Baron St Maur (died 1316), son of Laurence de St Maur (died 1282), of Rode. He engaged in King Edward I's expeditions into Scotland between 1298 and 1305. He was summoned to Parliament by King Edward II by writ in 1314, by which he is deemed to have become Baron St Maur. He married Elena la Zouche, the eldest daughter and co-heiress of Alan la Zouche, 1st Baron la Zouche (1267–1314) of Ashby and North Molton.
- Thomas de St Maur, 2nd Baron St Maur, eldest son, who died childless. He was never summoned to Parliament.
- Nicholas de St Maur, 3rd Baron St Maur (died 1361), younger brother. He fought in France during the reign of King Edward III in the retinue of Maurice de Berkeley and later in that of Thomas de Holand. He married Muriel Lovel, daughter of James Lovel, only son of Richard Lovel, 1st Baron Lovel of Cary (died 1351), feudal baron of Castle Cary in Somerset. She was the heiress of Castle Cary and of Winfred Eagle in Dorset.
- Nicholas de St Maur, 4th Baron St Maur (died 1361), eldest son who died a minor.
- Richard de St Maur, 5th Baron St Maur (died 1401), younger brother. He fought in France in 1386 in the retinue of Richard FitzAlan, 10th Earl of Arundel (c. 1306/1313-1376), Admiral of England. He married Ela St Lo, daughter and co-heiress of Sir John St Lo.
- Richard de St Maur, 6th Baron St Maur (died 1409), eldest son, who died without any sons, leaving a daughter and sole-heiress to the barony (which being a barony by writ could pass via females):
  - Alice de St Maur, wife of William la Zouche, 6th Baron Zouche (c.1432-1468/9) of Harringworth (a junior branch of Zouche of Ashby and North Molton) who following his marriage became also 7th Baron St Maur.
- John la Zouche, 7th Baron Zouche, 8th Baron St Maur (1459 – c. March 1525/6) (His attainder of 1485 was reversed in 1495)
- John la Zouche, 8th Baron Zouche, 9th Baron St Maur (c. 1486 – 10 August 1550)
- Richard la Zouche, 9th Baron Zouche, 10th Baron St Maur (c. 1510 – 22 July 1552)
- George la Zouche, 10th Baron Zouche, 11th Baron St Maur (c. 1526 – 19 June 1569)
- Edward la Zouche, 11th Baron Zouche, 12th Baron St Maur (6 June 1556 – 18 August 1625) (abeyant 1625)

== Sources ==
- Wilhelmina, Duchess of Cleveland The Battle Abbey Roll with some Account of the Norman Lineages, 3 volumes, London, 1889, vol.1, Sent More
- Burke, John, A General and Heraldic Dictionary of the Peerages of England, Ireland, and Scotland Extinct, Dormant and in Abeyance, London, 1831, pp. 461–2, Baron St Maur
- Faith, Juliet, The Knights Templar in Somerset, pp. 64–71, St Maur
- Loades, David, The Seymours of Wolf Hall: A Tudor Family Story, Chapter 1: The Origins
