= Saint George and the Dragon (Farleigh Hungerford Castle) =

Mural in Somerset, England

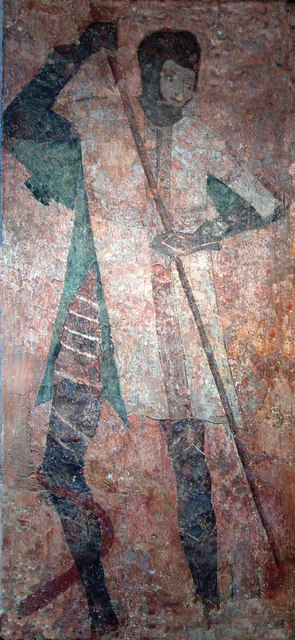
- Artist: Anonymous
- Year: 1430–1445
- Type: Mural
- Owner: English Heritage

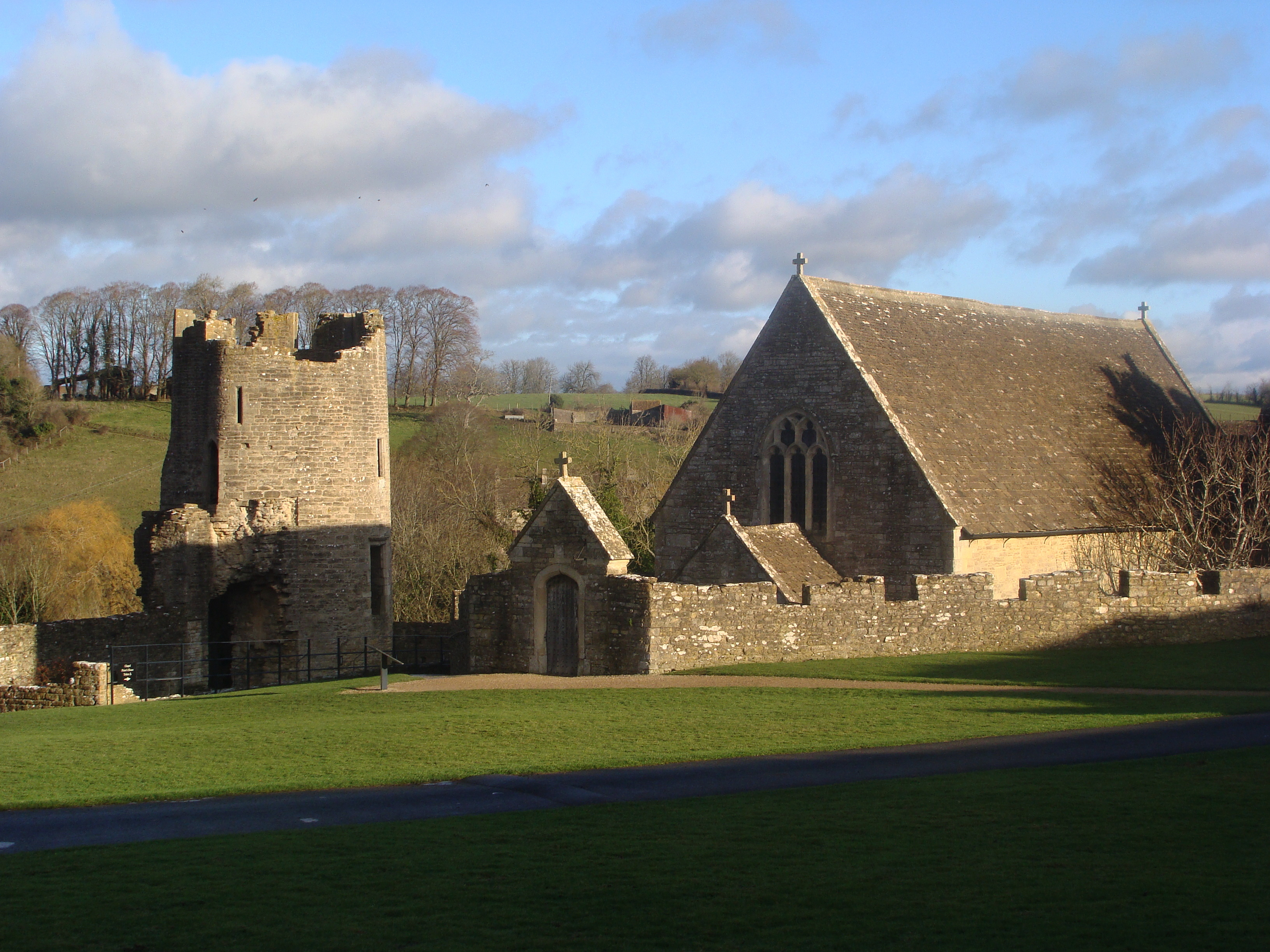
The chapel (right) which contains the mural

Saint George and the Dragon is a mural in the chapel of Farleigh Hungerford Castle, Somerset, England.

== Details ==
Between 1430 and 1445 Walter Hungerford, 1st Baron Hungerford, a former Speaker of the House of Commons, expanded his castle at Farleigh Hungerford considerably. The extension to the castle enclosed the former parish church, which became Walter's castle chapel, with a replacement church being built in the village. Walter had the chapel decorated with a number of murals, depicting scenes from the story of Saint George and the Dragon; Saint George was a favoured saint of Walter's patron, Henry V, and associated with the prestigious Order of the Garter, of which Walter was a proud member.

The chapel fell into ruin in the early 18th century, only being restored in 1779. The murals were rediscovered in 1844, and the castle and chapel became a 19th-century tourist attraction. The castle began to pass from private ownership into the hands of the Office of Works from 1915 onwards. Attempts were made to preserve the wall paintings in the chapel during 1931 and 1955, but the treatments, which involved the use of red wax, stained the paintings and caused considerable damage; the wax was removed in the 1970s.

The castle and chapel were recorded as Grade I listed in 1984, and are now owned by English Heritage; the chapel is open to the public during the summer season. The historian Simon Roffey describes the painting as a "remarkable" work.

== Bibliography ==
- Creighton, Oliver Hamilton. (2005) Castles and Landscapes: Power, Community and Fortification in Medieval England. London: Equinox. ISBN 978-1-904768-67-8.
- Jackson, J. E. (1851) "Farleigh Hungerford Castle, Somerset," Proceedings of Somerset Archaeology 1–3 pp.114–124.
- Kightly, Charles. (2006) Farleigh Hungerford Castle. London: English Heritage. ISBN 1-85074-997-3.
- Miles, T. J and A. D. Saunders. (1975) "The Chantry House at Farleigh Hungerford Castle," Medieval Archaeology 19, pp.165–94.
- Roffey, Simon. (2007) The Medieval Chantry Chapel: an Archaeology. Woodbridge, UK: Boydell Press. ISBN 978-1-84383-334-5.
