= William Sidney (courtier) =

English courtier

Sir William Sidney (c. 1482–1554) was an English courtier under Henry VIII and Edward VI.

== Life ==
Sidney was eldest son of Nicholas Sidney, by Anne, sister of Sir William Brandon. In 1511 he accompanied Thomas Darcy, 1st Baron Darcy de Darcy into Spain as a volunteer against the Moors, and when Darcy, finding his assistance not required, returned almost immediately to England, Sidney and several of his companions remained behind in order to see Madrid. He was hospitably entertained by King Ferdinand, but declined the honour of knighthood from him; and shortly afterwards returned home through France.

As captain of the 'Great Bark' he took part in the naval operations before Brest in April 1513, and later in the year commanded the right wing of the English army at the battle of Flodden. He was knighted for his services, and on 23 March 1514 obtained a grant in tail male of the lordship of Kingston-upon-Hull and the manor of Myton forfeited by the attainder of Edmund de la Pole. In October, he accompanied his cousin Charles Brandon, 1st Duke of Suffolk and Thomas Grey, 2nd Marquess of Dorset to Paris, to witness the coronation on 5 November of the Princess Mary as consort of Louis XII, and took a prominent part in the subsequent jousts and festivities. In the following summer, he again went to France, charged with the delicate task of announcing the approaching second marriage of Mary, to the Duke of Suffolk.

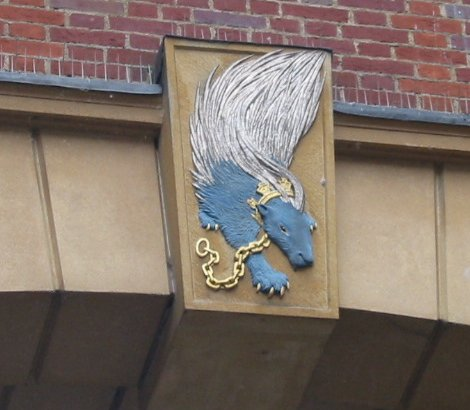
Heraldic emblem of Sidney Sussex College, Cambridge, founded by Frances Sidney (Sidney’s daughter), a porcupine (statant) azure quills collar and chain or, being the crest of the Sidney family

It is believed by the Sidney family that Sidney at that time adopted as a second family crest a porcupine statant azure quills collar and chain or, being the heraldic emblem of King Louis XII.

Sidney was appointed an Esquire of the Body to Henry VIII, and married in 1517. He accompanied the king to the Field of the Cloth of Gold in 1520, and in 1523, during the war with France, took part in the expedition commanded by the Duke of Suffolk. In March 1538, he was appointed tutor and steward of the household to Prince Edward. In 1539, he received a large grant of lands in Kent and Sussex in exchange for those held by him in York and Lincoln.

Sidney’s wife died on 22 October 1543. On 25 April 1552, Edward VI added the manor of Penshurst Place to Sidney’s estates in Kent. A decade later, Sidney died at Penshurst on 10 February 1554, and was buried in the parish church.

== Personal life ==
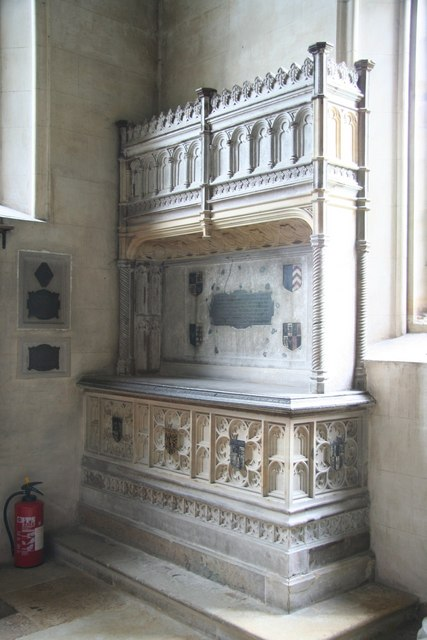
Tomb of Sir William Sidney (c. 1482–1554) at St John the Baptist, Penshurst

Sidney married Anne Pakenham, daughter of Sir Hugh Pakenham, and widow of Thomas FitzWilliam, (elder brother of William FitzWilliam, 1st Earl of Southampton). They had five surviving children, four daughters and a son, Henry Sidney who was born in 1529.

In the chancel of St John the Baptist, Penshurst is the tomb of Sidney with a memorial tablet, on the sides of which are engraven the escutcheons of his four daughters and their husbands:

- Mary (d. 10 February 1542), eldest daughter, who married Sir William Dormer of Wing, Buckinghamshire, (Note: Mary married Sir William Dormer and was the mother of Thomas, Robert, Jane who became a lady-in-waiting to Queen Mary I, and Anne, who married Sir Walter Hungerford.)
- Lucy, who married Sir James Harington of Exton Hall, Rutland;
- Anne (d. 1602), who married Sir William FitzWilliam of Milton, Northamptonshire, sometime lord deputy of Ireland.
- Frances, who was the second wife of Thomas Radcliffe, 3rd Earl of Sussex.
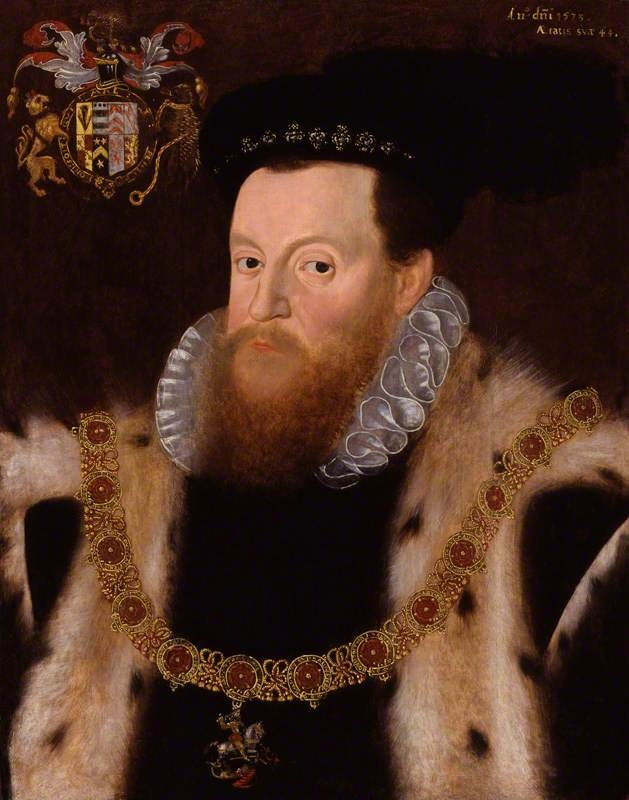
Sir Henry Sydney

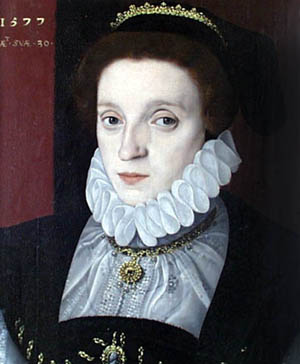
Lady Anne (Sidney) Fitzwilliam, 1577

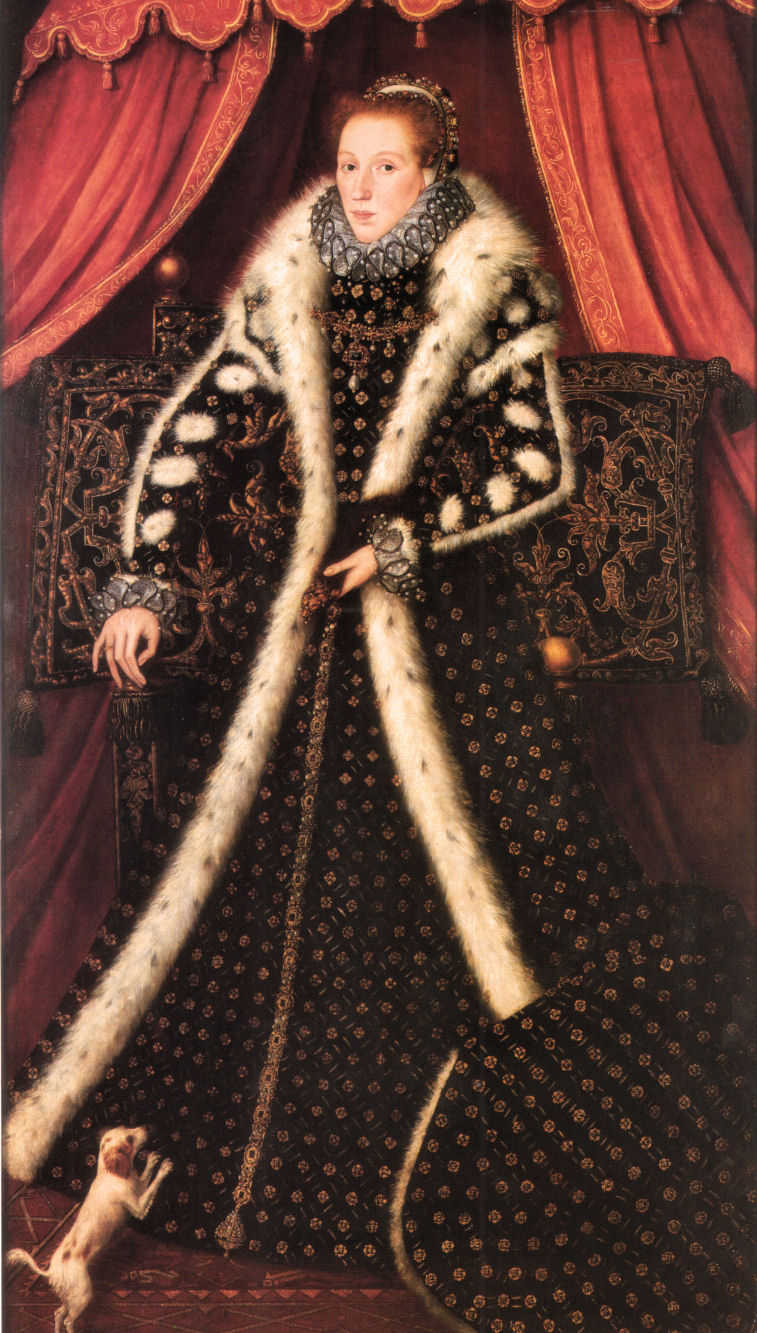
The Countess of Sussex c. 1570-75
