= Blakiston baronets of Blakiston (1615) =

Escutcheon of the Blakiston baronets of Blakiston

The Blakiston baronetcy, of the manor of Blakiston in the parish of Norton in the Bishopric of Durham, was created in the Baronetage of England on 27 May 1615 for Thomas Blakiston. He had no sons and consequently the title became extinct on his death in 1630.

Blakiston married c.1610 into the Constable family of Burton Constable Hall: his wife Mary Constable was the daughter of Sir Henry Constable (died 1608), Member of Parliament for Hedon and Yorkshire and his wife Margaret Dormer, daughter of William Dormer. The Constables and Dormers were Catholic recusant families, even if Sir Henry was cautious about expressing his religious views. The Constables were powerful in Holderness and wealthy. Blakiston's marriage made him the brother-in-law of Henry Constable (1588–1645), the eldest son of Sir Henry, an open Catholic who was knighted on 14 March 1615. As a further sign of court favour he was awarded a Scottish peerage in 1620.

== Blakiston baronets, of the manor of Blakiston (1615) ==
- Sir Thomas Blakiston, 1st Baronet (1582–1630)

== Notes ==
Baronetage of England
Preceded by Grimston baronets	Blakiston baronets 27 May 1615	Succeeded by Dormer baronets
