= Anne Hungerford =

English lady of the royal court

Anne, Lady Hungerford
- Born: Anne Dormer; 1525; England
- Died: 1603 (aged 77–78); Louvain, Flemish Brabant (present-day Belgium)
- Spouses: Sir Walter Hungerford (m. 1558–1596); 4 children
- Issue: Edmund Hungerford; Susan Hungerford; Lucy Hungerford; Jane Hungerford
- Father: Sir William Dormer
- Mother: Mary, Lady Dormer (née Sidney)
- Occupation: Courtier, poet

Anne, Lady Hungerford (née Dormer; 1525–1603) was an English lady of the royal court during the reign of Queen Mary I, and poet.

== Biography ==
Anne was a daughter of Sir William Dormer by his first wife, Mary, daughter of Sir William Sidney and Anne (née Pakenham). She was the sister of Jane Dormer, a lady in waiting to Queen Mary I, and later wife of the Duke of Feria. Both Anne and Jane were prominent recusants.

In 1558 Queen Mary gave permission for Sir Walter Hungerford, who had earlier been married to the Queen's Maid of Honour, Anne Basset, to marry Anne Dormer as his second wife. In 1568 Hungerford sued for divorce, alleging that his wife had tried to poison him some years earlier, and that she had committed adultery with William Darrell (of Littlecote, Wiltshire), and had had a child by him.

Hungerford failed to prove the allegations in court, and subsequently spent three years in Fleet Prison for his refusal to support his wife or to pay the £250 in costs awarded against him in the divorce suit. Two letters from Lady Hungerford, written in 1570, speak of her impoverished circumstances. Through the offices of the Earl of Leicester, Lady Hungerford obtained licence in 1571 to visit her dying grandmother, Jane Dormer (née Newdigate), who was living in the English Catholic expatriate community at Louvain. She never returned to England, choosing to remain in Belgium herself. On 29 March 1586, she wrote from Namur to Sir Francis Walsingham, requesting that he protect her daughters from her husband's attempts to disinherit them.

In his will, dated 14 November 1595, Hungerford left two farms to his mistress, Margery Bright, and the residue of his estate to his half brother, Sir Edward Hungerford, with remainder to the [male] heirs ... of 'any woman' he [Edward] should 'afterwards marry'. After making his will, having heard rumours that his wife was dead, Hungerford married Margery Bright.

Sir Walter Hungerford died in December 1596 in Farleigh Hungerford Somerset, and was succeeded by his half brother, who was sued by both Lady Anne Hungerford and Margery Bright, for dower. Lady Hungerford was granted [a] 'generous' dower', and died at Louvain in 1603. It is unclear if Bright received a dower.

== Marriage and issue ==
Sir Walter and Lady Anne Hungerford had a son and three daughters:

- Edmund Hungerford, who died in December 1585 without issue.
- Susan Hungerford, who married firstly Michael Ernley of Cannings, Wiltshire, and, secondly, John Moring, and, thirdly, Sir Carew Reynolds, MP for Callington
- Lucy Hungerford, who married firstly Sir John St. John of Lydiard Tregoze, and, secondly, Sir Anthony Hungerford of Black Bourton.
- Jane Hungerford, who married Sir John Carne of Ewenny, Glamorganshire, Wales.
