= Agnes Hungerford =

English murderer (hanged 1523)

Agnes Hungerford Lady Hungerford
- Died: 20 February 1523; Tyburn
- Other name: Agnes Cotell

Agnes, Lady Hungerford (died 20 February 1523) was a murderer and the second wife of Sir Edward Hungerford. When he died in 1522, Agnes was then charged and convicted of the murder of her first husband, John Cotell. She was hanged at Tyburn in 1523.

== Biography ==
Agnes was the widow of John Cotell, the steward of Sir Edward Hungerford. Agnes strangled her first husband at Farleigh Castle on 26 July 1518, with the aid of William Mathewe and William Inges, yeomen of Heytesbury, Wiltshire. She married Sir Edward after her first husband's body was burned in the castle kitchens. Her second husband may have been involved in the murder, or protected his wife from arrest during his lifetime.

Her second husband died 24 January 1522 and Agnes was the sole executrix of his will. Around this time, proceedings were taken against Agnes and her accomplices for the murder of her first husband. She and Mathewe were convicted and hanged at Tyburn on 20 February 1523; she is likely buried in the Grey Friars' Church in London.

After she died, Agnes' family left her out of documents such as genealogies due to her notoriety.
