= Dorothy Pelham =

English benefactor

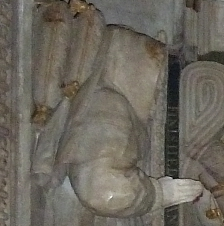
- her effigy
- Born: Dorothy Catesby
- Died: 30 September 1613
- Occupation: Noble
- Title: Lady
- Spouse(s): Sir William Dormer; Sir William Pelham
- Children: seven

Dorothy Pelham born Dorothy Catesby became Dorothy Dormer and Dorothy, Lady Pelham (died 30 September 1613) was an English benefactor.

== Life ==
She was the daughter of Isabel and Anthony Catesby of Whiston where her father had paid for the local church. In 1550 she made her first marriage when she became the second wife of Sir William Dormer who already had a small family. William was of strong Catholic sympathies. His uncle, Sebastian Newdigate had died for his beliefs in 1535.

The Eythorpe mansion was extended in 1610 by Dorothy Pelham, (One source says Sir William Dormer) this was her house from her first marriage. Her second husband William Pelham styled himself as "from Eythorpe", but this was more true of Dorothy who had her own financial independence.

== Death and legacy ==
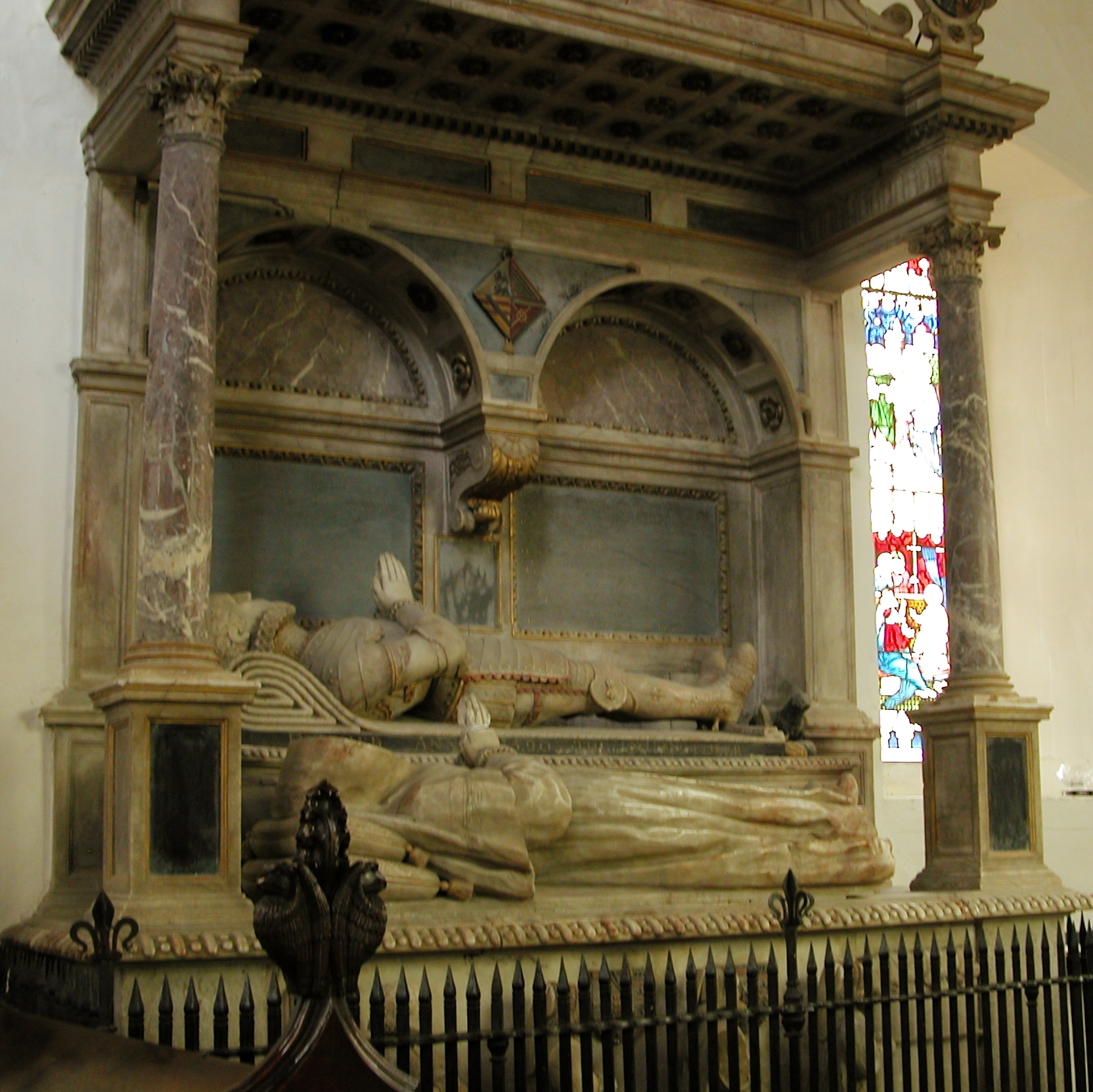
Her first husband William and Dorothy at All Saints Church Wing

The burial register records her death of 30 September 1613 where she is described as "The Good Lady Dame Dorothe Pelham". Her main will was dated 24 June 1611 and there was a codicil dated 19 September 1613. The former requested that she should be buried by her first husband and the latter defined some philanthropy. She left money to repair the roads not just on her home estate but in the nearby towns of Aylesbury, Leighton Buzzard, High Wycombe and in nearly every parish where she owned the manor.

The mansion at Eythorpe stood for 200 years after she extended it.

== Family ==
They had one son, Robert Dormer, 1st Baron Dormer, who married Elizabeth Browne, the daughter of Anthony Browne, 1st Viscount Montagu, and six daughters: Mary, who married Anthony Browne, the twin brother of Mary Browne, mother of Henry Wriothesley, 3rd Earl of Southampton; Grissel; Katherine, who married John St John, 2nd Baron St John of Bletso (d.1596); Frances; Amphyllis; and Margaret (d.1637), who married Sir Henry Constable (d.1608). After Sir William Dormer's death his widow, Dorothy, married Sir William Pelham.

== Sources ==
- Dunlop, Robert (1895). "Pelham, William" . In Lee, Sidney (ed.). Dictionary of National Biography. Vol. 44. London: Smith, Elder & Co. pp. 255–257.
- Dunlop, Robert (1897). "Sidney, Henry (1529-1586)" . In Lee, Sidney (ed.). Dictionary of National Biography. Vol. 52. London: Smith, Elder & Co. pp. 210–217.
- Hanley, Hugh (2006). "Pelham, Dorothy, Lady Pelham (d. 1613)". Oxford Dictionary of National Biography (online ed.). Oxford University Press. doi:10.1093/ref:odnb/95013. (Subscription, Wikipedia Library access or UK public library membership required.)
- Richardson, Douglas (2011). Everingham, Kimball G. (ed.). Magna Carta Ancestry: A Study in Colonial and Medieval Families. Vol. III (2nd ed.). Salt Lake City. pp. 254–6. ISBN 978-1449966393.
