= John la Zouche, 7th Baron Zouche, 8th Baron St Maur =

Yorkist politician

John la Zouche, 7th Baron Zouche, 8th Baron St Maur (1459–1526) was a Yorkist nobleman and politician. He was noted for his loyalty to Richard III, under whose command he fought at the Battle of Bosworth, where Richard was killed. Under the victorious Tudor dynasty he suffered attainder and forfeiture of his property, but he was eventually restored to royal favour, due partly to a marriage connection to the new King's mother.

== Background ==
John la Zouche was the son of William la Zouche, 6th Baron Zouche and his first wife, Katherine Lenthall, daughter of Sir Rowland Lenthall, Sheriff of Herefordshire and his wife Lucy Grey, daughter of the 4th Baron Grey of Codnor. His father had inherited the barony of St Maur through his mother Alice St Maur, first wife of William la Zouche, 5th Baron Zouche (c. 1402 – 1462), and daughter of Sir Richard St. Maur (died 6 January 1409) by Mary Pever, the daughter of Thomas Pever (died 22 September 1429).

After the death of Alice St Maur, the 5th Baron married Elizabeth St. John, whose half-sister was Margaret Beaufort, mother of the future Henry VII, a connection which later proved to be of great value to his grandson.

Zouche's mother seems to have died soon after his birth; his father died when he was nine. His stepmother, Katherine Plumpton, remarried, to Sir Gilbert Debenham, a Suffolk landowner who acquired considerable influence at the Court of Edward IV. Other family connections strengthened the tie to the House of York: Elizabeth, Lady Zouche, after the 5th Baron's death, remarried John Scrope, 5th Baron Scrope of Bolton, who was to be a strong supporter of Richard III. John's sister Margaret married Sir William Catesby, who was to be one of the mainstays of Richard's government.

== His career under Richard III ==
During Richard's brief reign Zouche became a leading political figure. His family's influence in Northamptonshire was useful to the King, who otherwise relied mainly on the Yorkshire nobility for his political support. Zouche in turn sought to expand his influence in Cornwall, and also in Devonshire, where his wife's family, the Dynhams, were major landholders and had gained considerable political power under Edward IV.

Zouche's political career was destroyed at the Battle of Bosworth. Being staunchly loyal to Richard, he fought for him in the battle, and was captured by the victorious Tudor army either during it or shortly afterwards. Unlike his brother-in-law Sir William Catesby, who was considered to be such a danger to the new regime that he was executed summarily, Zouche's life was spared.

== Attainder ==
He was attainted by Henry VII's first Parliament (November–December 1485), and suffered the forfeiture of all his lands. He was pardoned in July 1486 and given a small annuity, but the attainder was not reversed even in part until 1489, and even then he was permitted only to inherit the property his grandfather had received through his second marriage. It has been suggested that Henry's treatment of him was exceptionally severe, perhaps reflecting his position of power under Richard III. On the other hand, Henry VII strove throughout his reign to discipline the nobility by imposing on them severe financial penalties, often on the flimsiest of pretexts, to such an extent that in the last years of his reign the nobility have been described as living in a perpetual atmosphere of "watchfulness, fear and suspicion".

Zouche attempted to gain favour with the King by serving in the French campaign of 1492, but without success. His financial situation continued to suffer: his position was considered insufficient to allow him to maintain the status of a nobleman and he suffered the humiliation of being styled a mere knight.

== Restoration of titles and dignities ==
He was eventually restored to all his titles and dignities in 1495. He owed a good deal of thanks for this to the prominent courtier Sir Reginald Bray, for whose support he had to pay a heavy price, selling him several manors at an undervalue. A more surprising ally was Margaret Beaufort, the King's mother, who throughout her life showed a warm affection for all of her extended family, and especially the St. Johns of Lydiard Tregoze; so that even Lord Zouche, who was merely the grandson of her sister's husband by a previous marriage, benefited from her generosity. She probably used her influence to have the attainder reversed; she certainly obtained a pension for Lady Zouche, and had some of the Zouche children brought up in her own household.

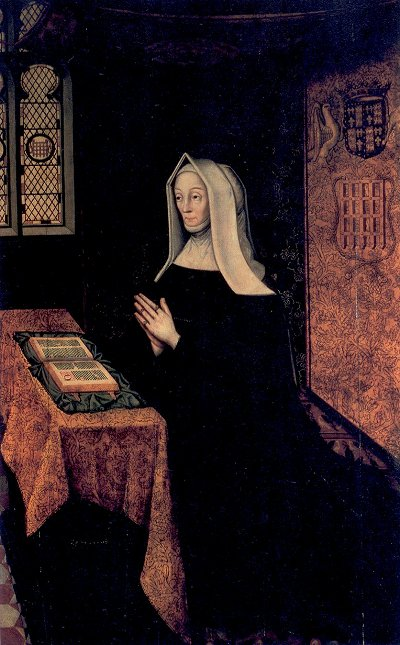
Lady Margaret Beaufort, mother of King Henry VII, later a surprising ally of Lord Zouche, who was a distant relative by marriage

By 1500 Zouche was in fairly good standing at Court: he was part of the entourage which accompanied the King to meet Archduke Philip of Austria at Calais, and the following year he was one of the nobles who greeted Catherine of Aragon on her arrival at Amesbury. His later years were uneventful; he died at Castle Cary in March 1526.

== Marriage and children ==
He married Joan Dinham, a daughter of Sir John Dinham (1406–1458) of Hartland and of Nutwell both in Devon, by his wife Joan Arches, sister and heiress of John Arches and daughter of Sir Richard Arches (died 1417), MP for Buckinghamshire in 1402, of Eythrope and Cranwell (both in the parish of Waddesdon) and Little Kimble, Buckinghamshire. She was one of the four surviving sisters and co-heiresses of her brother John Dynham, 1st Baron Dynham (1433–1501), KG. By his wife he had at least six children, including:

- John Zouche, 8th Baron Zouche (died 1551), eldest son and heir.
- William Zouche of Bulwick, Northamptonshire, who married Jane Bradborne, and had at least one daughter, Frances Zouche, who married William Saunders: they were ancestors of the Dukes of Buckingham
- Jane Zouche, who married Sir Edward Hungerford (died 1522). She was appointed to wait on Catherine of Aragon in October 1501. She was the mother of Walter Hungerford, 1st Baron Hungerford of Heytesbury (1503–1540).
- Katherine Zouche, who married firstly John Carew (d.1528) of Haccombe in Devon, and secondly Sir Robert Brandon, an uncle of Charles Brandon, 1st Duke of Suffolk.
- Margaret Zouche.
- Cecily Zouche.

== Notes ==
Peerage of England
Preceded by William la Zouche	Baron St Maur; 1469-1525	Succeeded by John la Zouche
Preceded by William la Zouche	Baron Zouche; 1469-1525	Succeeded by John la Zouche
