= William Dormer =

English knight & politician (died 1575)

Sir William Dormer
- Died: 17 May 1575
- Spouse(s): Mary Sidney; Dorothy Catesby
- Children: 10 or 11, including Anne Dormer, Jane Dormer, and Robert Dormer
- Parent(s): Sir Robert Dormer, Jane Newdigate

Sir William Dormer (died 17 May 1575) was a Tudor knight, captain and politician.

== Biography ==
William Dormer was born before 1514, the only child of Sir Robert Dormer of West Wycombe and of Wing, Buckinghamshire, and London (died 2 or 8 July 1552), and his wife Jane Newdigate (d. 1568), daughter of John Newdigate (died 15 August 1528) of Harefield, Middlesex, by Amphyllis Neville (d. 15 July 1544). (Note: William Dormer was the grandson of William Dormer, Esquire, and his first wife, Jane Launcelyn, the daughter and coheiress of Sir John Launcelyn, and the great-grandson of Geoffrey Dormer, Merchant of the Staple at Calais (d. 9 March 1503).)

From 1535 until 1559, Dormer's main residence was Eythrope in Buckinghamshire. A William Dormer was in the service of Thomas Cromwell and considered for transfer to royal service in 1538. If the subject of this biography was that William Dormer then his marriage to Mary, daughter of Sir William Sidney may have been assisted by Cromwell. In 1553, he was made a knight of the Order of the Bath.

Dormer was returned as the second member for Chipping Wycombe in the parliament of 1542 and served under his father's command in the war against France in 1544. He may well have been the "young Dormer" who for two years was captain of 100 men at a muster in Buckinghamshire. Two years later (in 1546) he accompanied his father to a reception at court for the French ambassador.

In 1553 he was returned as a knight of the shire for Buckinghamshire in the second parliament of Edward VI. It is not known what his position was in the succession crisis in 1553 when John Dudley, 1st Duke of Northumberland, attempted to place Lady Jane Grey on the throne, but in May 1554 Queen Mary confirmed him in his post as falconer in recognition of his support for her against Northumberland. He may have been made Sheriff for Bedfordshire and Buckinghamshire due to his daughter, Jane Dormer's, friendship with Queen Mary, and his daughter's connection to the Queen may also have influenced his return to Mary's fifth parliament as knight of the shire for Buckinghamshire in 1558.

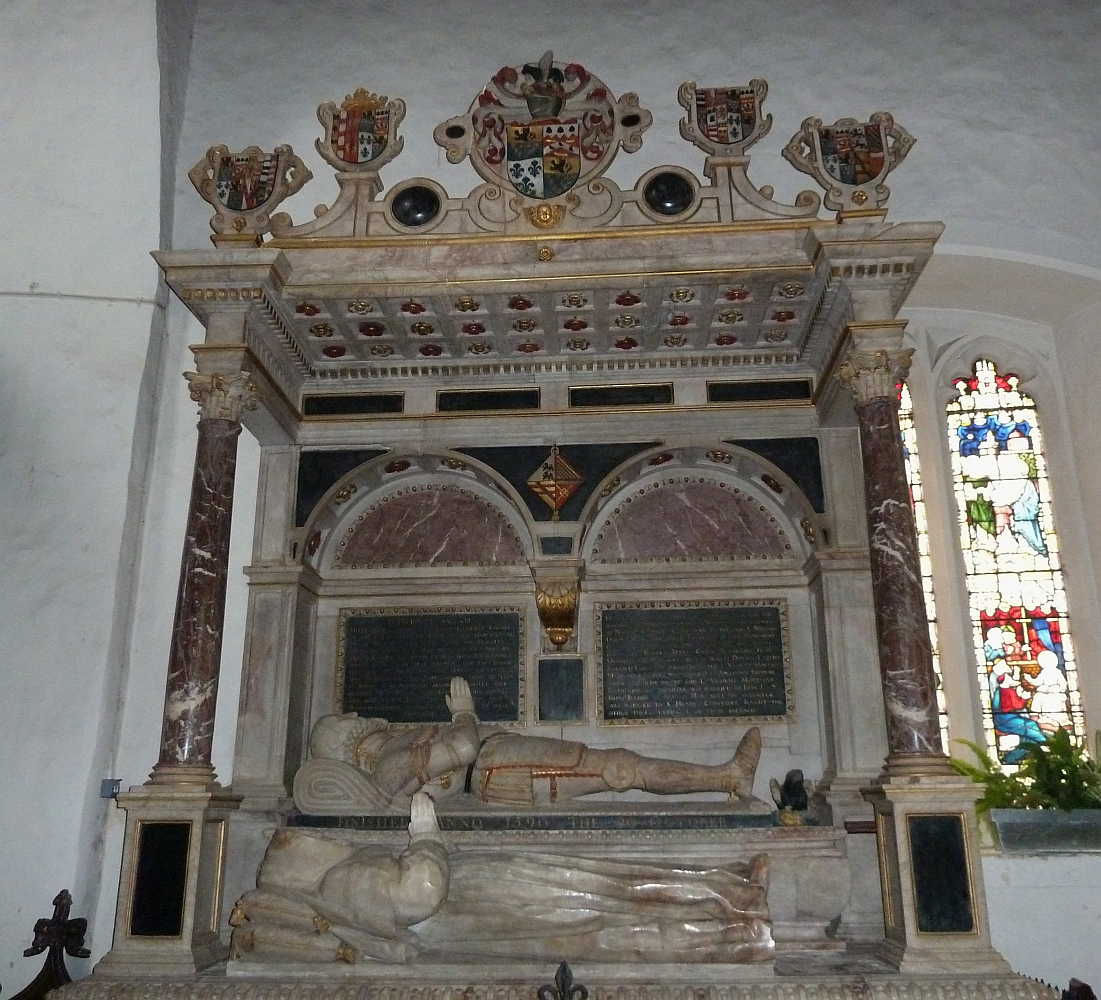
Tomb of Sir William Dormer and Dame Dorathe Dormer, Wing Church, Buckinghamshire

After the death of Queen Mary, Dormer's mother, Jane (née Newdigate), and Dormer's daughter, Jane, left England for the continent. Dormer, too, disliked Queen Elizabeth's Anglican compromise; however, his Catholic family connections did not harm his political standing, either in national politics (in 1571 he again sat as a member of Parliament for Buckinghamshire in Elizabeth's third parliament), or in local affairs.

Dormer died at the age of 72 and was buried in the family vault in All Saints' Church, Wing. His second wife, Dorathy, had a monument built for him in the church, and founded an almshouse in the village of Wing in his memory.

== Marriages and issue ==
Dormer married firstly Mary, eldest daughter of Sir William Sidney and Anne Pakenham. They had two sons, Thomas Dormer and Robert Dormer, said to have died as infants, and two daughters, Anne Dormer, who married Sir Walter Hungerford, and Jane Dormer, a lady in waiting to Queen Mary who married the Duke of Feria, Spanish ambassador to the Court of Saint James.

After the death of his first wife Dormer married, about 1550, Dorothy Catesby (d.1613), the daughter of Isabel and Anthony Catesby (d.1554) of Whiston, Northamptonshire. Dorothy Catesby was twenty years Dormer's junior. They had one son, Robert Dormer, 1st Baron Dormer, who married Elizabeth Browne, the daughter of Anthony Browne, 1st Viscount Montagu, and six daughters: Mary, who married Anthony Browne, the twin brother of Mary Browne, mother of Henry Wriothesley, 3rd Earl of Southampton; Grissel; Katherine, who married John St John, 2nd Baron St John of Bletso (d.1596); Frances; Amphyllis; and Margaret (d.1637), who married Henry Constable (d.1607), son of John Constable (of Burton Constable). After Sir William Dormer's death his widow, Dorothy, married Sir William Pelham.

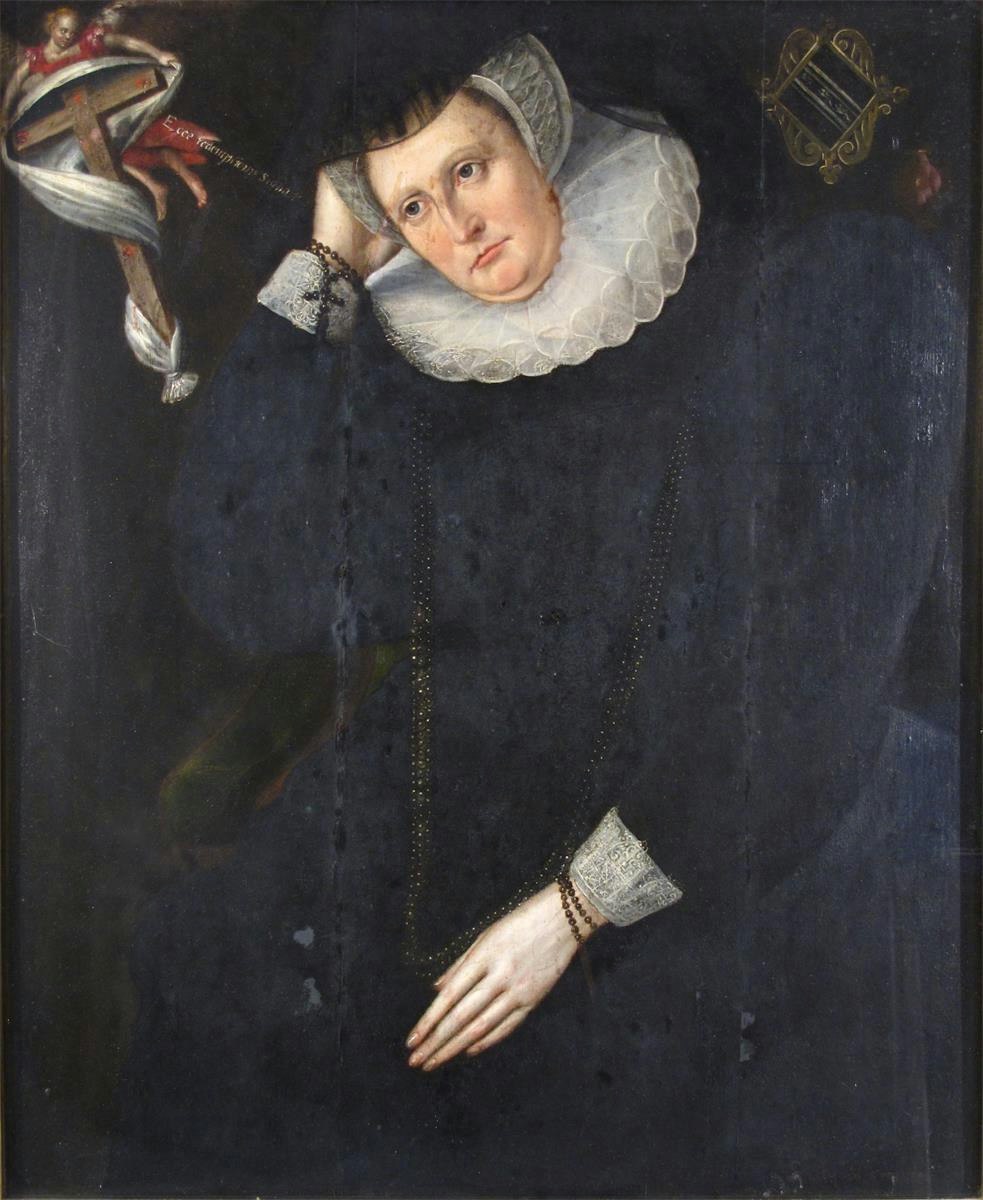
Late 16th century c. 1592, oil portrait of a member of the Browne and or Dormer family

== Notes ==
Political offices
Preceded by Thomas Pigott	High Sheriff of Bedfordshire and Buckinghamshire; 1553–1554	Succeeded by Arthur Longueville
Preceded by John Borlase	High Sheriff of Bedfordshire and Buckinghamshire; 1568–1569	Succeeded by Sir Edmund Ashfield
