= Blakiston baronets =

Set index for Blakiston baronets

There have been three baronetcies created for members of the Blakiston family of Blakiston, County Durham, two in the Baronetage of England and one in the Baronetage of Great Britain. One creation is extant as of 2026. The surname is usually pronounced "Blackiston".

- Blakiston baronets of Blakiston (1615)
- Blakiston baronets of Gibside (1642)
- Blakiston baronets of London (1763)
