= Blakiston baronets of Gibside (1642) =

Escutcheon of the Blakiston baronets of Gibside

The Blakiston baronetcy (or Blackstone), of Gibside in the Bishopric of Durham, was created in the Baronetage of England on 30 July 1642 for Sir Ralph Blakiston, son of Sir William Blakiston (1562–1641).

His son the 2nd Baronet died childless in 1692 and was succeeded by his younger brother, the 3rd Baronet. The baronetcy became extinct on the latter's death in 1713.

== Blakiston baronets, of Gibside (1642) ==
- Sir Ralph Blakiston, 1st Baronet (c. 1589–1650)
- Sir William Blakiston, 2nd Baronet (died 1692)
- Sir Francis Blakiston, 3rd Baronet (died 1716), left no male heir.
