= Edward Hungerford (died 1522) =

English nobleman, soldier, and sheriff

Sir Edward Hungerford (died 1522), was a soldier and courtier in the court of King Henry VIII of England who was present at the Field of the Cloth of Gold in 1520.

== Biography ==
Edward was the son and heir of Sir Walter Hungerford of Farleigh and his wife Jane, daughter of Sir William Bulstrode.

He accompanied Sir Walter to Scotland in 1503. He served in the English army in France in 1513, when he was knighted at the siege of Tournai. He was Sheriff of Wiltshire in 1517, and Sheriff of Somerset and Dorset in 1518.

In 1520, he attended Henry VIII at the Field of the Cloth of Gold. He died on 24 January 1522, survived by his second wife Agnes who was sole executrix of his will.

== Family ==
Sir Edward married twice. His first wife was Jane de la Zouche daughter of John, 7th Lord Zouche. She was appointed to wait on Catherine of Aragon in October 1501. They had one child Walter (1503–1540) who was created 1st Baron Hungerford of Heytesbury in 1536.

Sir Edward's second wife was Agnes Cotell. Agnes had strangled her first husband just before she married again to Sir Edward. Not until Sir Edward's death were proceedings taken against her and her accomplices for the murder. She and Mathewe were then convicted and were hanged at Tyburn on 20 February 1524; Sir Edward's involvement in the murder or cover-up is unclear.
