= Walter Hungerford, 1st Baron Hungerford of Heytesbury =

English nobleman (1503–1540)

- Born: 1503
- Died: 28 July 1540 (aged 36–37); Tower Hill, London, England
- Spouses: Susan Danvers; Alice Sandys; Elizabeth Hussey
- Issue: Sir Walter Hungerford; Sir Edward Hungerford; Mary Hungerford
- Father: Edward Hungerford (died 1522)
- Mother: Jane Zouche

Walter Hungerford, 1st Baron Hungerford of Heytesbury (1503 – 28 July 1540), was created Baron Hungerford of Heytesbury in 1536. He was the first person to be convicted under the Buggery Act 1533.

== Biography ==
Walter Hungerford was born in 1503 at Heytesbury, Wiltshire, the only child of Sir Edward Hungerford (died 1522) of Farleigh Hungerford, Somerset, and his first wife, Jane Zouche, daughter of John, Lord Zouche of Harringworth (1459–1526).

Hungerford was nineteen years old at his father's death in 1522, and soon afterwards appears as squire of the body to Henry VIII. In 1529, he was granted permission to alienate part of his large estates. On 20 August 1532, John Hussey, 1st Baron Hussey of Sleaford, whose daughter, Elizabeth, was Hungerford's third wife, wrote to Sir Thomas Cromwell stating that Hungerford wished to be introduced to him. A little later, Hussey informed Cromwell that Hungerford desired to be sheriff of Wiltshire, a desire which was gratified in 1533. Hungerford proved useful to Cromwell in Wiltshire, and in June 1535 Cromwell made a memorandum that Hungerford ought to be rewarded for his well-doing. On 8 June 1536, he was summoned to parliament as Lord Hungerford of Heytesbury.

In 1540, he, together with his chaplain, a Wiltshire clergyman named William Bird, Rector of Fittleton and Vicar of Bradford, who was suspected of sympathising with the pilgrims of grace of the north of England, was attainted by an act of Parliament (32 Hen. 8. c. 61 Pr.). Hungerford was charged with employing Bird in his house as chaplain, knowing him to be a traitor; with ordering another chaplain, Hugh Wood, and one Dr. Maudlin to practise conjuring to determine the king's length of life, and his chances of victory over the northern rebels; and finally with committing offences forbidden by the Buggery Act 1533 (25 Hen. 8. c. 6). He was beheaded at Tower Hill on 28 July 1540, along with his patron, Cromwell. It has been stated that before his execution Hungerford "seemed so unquiet that many judged him rather in a frenzy than otherwise."

== Family ==
Hungerford married firstly Susan Danvers, daughter of Sir John Danvers of Dauntsey, Wiltshire, and Anne Stradling, They had two children:

- Sir Walter Hungerford (died 1596), his heir, knighted in 1554
- Jane Hungerford (died 1575), who married John Crane of Wildon

He married secondly, in 1527, Alice Sandys, daughter of William Sandys, 1st Baron Sandys, by whom he had a son and two daughters:

- Edward (died 1607), became one of Queen Elizabeth's gentlemen pensioners, and who married firstly, after 1574, Jane Hungerford, widow of William Forster of Aldermaston, Berkshire, and daughter of Anthony Hungerford of Down Ampney, Gloucestershire, and secondly Cecily Tufton (d.1653), daughter of Sir John Tufton of Hothfield, Kent, but died without issue. His widow married Francis Manners, 6th Earl of Rutland.
- Eleanor Hungerford, who married William Masters and John Hungerford
- Mary Hungerford, who married firstly Thomas Baker, esquire, and secondly Thomas Shaa.

He married thirdly, in October 1532, Elizabeth Hussey (d. 23 January 1554), daughter of John Hussey, 1st Baron Hussey of Sleaford, and his second wife, Anne Grey (d.1546), daughter of George Grey, 2nd Earl of Kent (d.1503), by his second wife, Katherine Herbert, daughter of William Herbert, 1st Earl of Pembroke, by Anne Devereux. Hungerford's treatment of his third wife was remarkable for its brutality. In an appeal for protection which she addressed to Thomas Cromwell in about 1536, she asserted that he kept her incarcerated at Farleigh for three or four years, made some fruitless attempts to divorce her, and endeavoured on several occasions to poison her. There were no children from the marriage. After Hungerford's execution, she became the second wife of Sir Robert Throckmorton (d.1581).
