= Jane Dormer =

English lady-in-waiting to Mary I

- Duchess of Feria
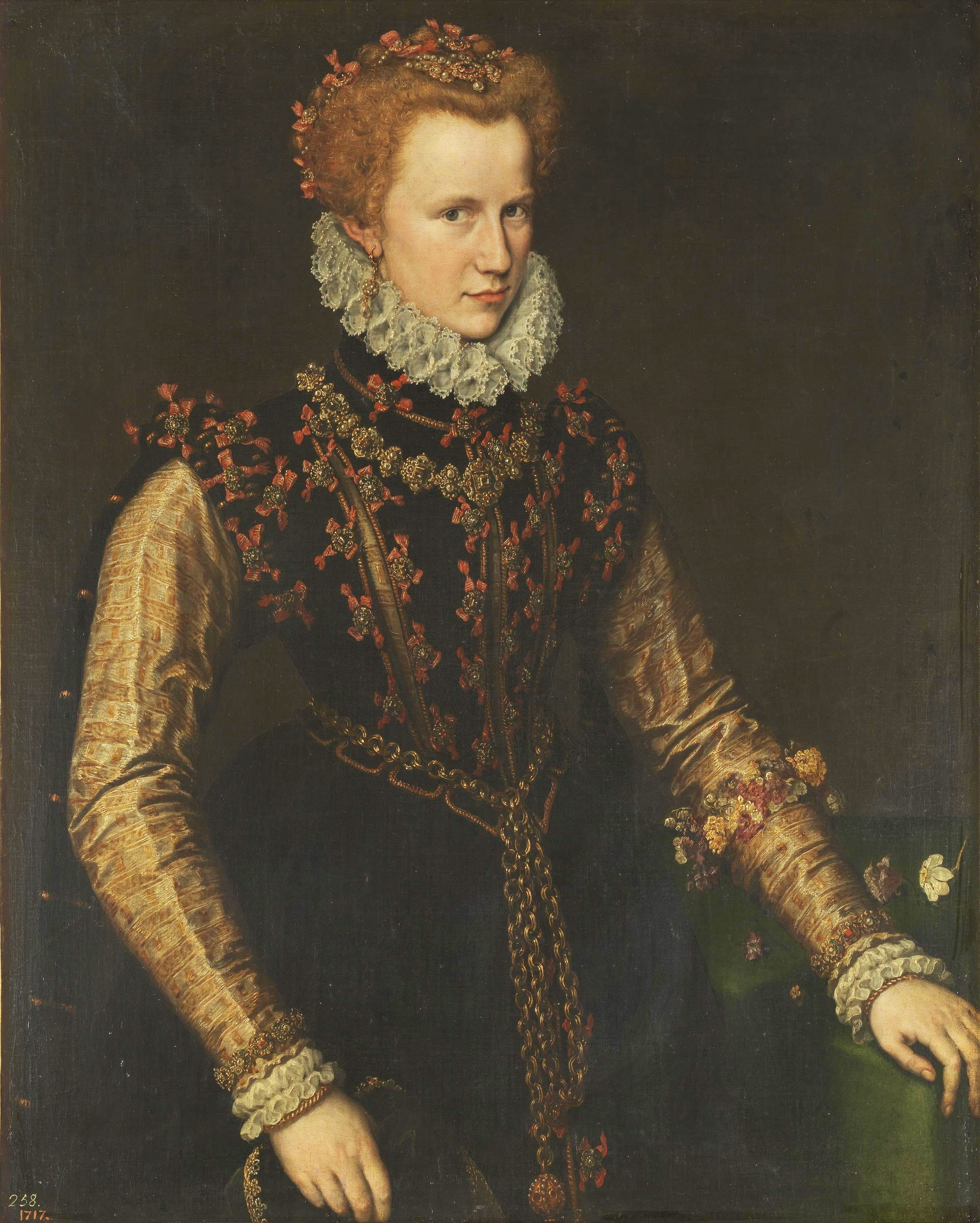
- Portrait thought to be of Jane Dormer, by Antonis Mor
- Born: 6 January 1538; Eythrope, Buckinghamshire, England
- Died: 13 January 1612 (aged 74); Spain
- Buried: Monastery of Santa Clara, Zafra, Extremadura, Spain
- Spouse: Gómez Suárez de Figueroa y Córdoba, 1st Duke of Feria (m. 1558; died 1571)
- Issue: Lorenzo Suárez de Figueroa y Córdoba
- Father: Sir William Dormer
- Mother: Mary Sidney
- Occupation: Lady-in-Waiting to Queen Mary I

Jane Dormer, Duchess of Feria (6 January 1538 – 13 January 1612) was an English lady-in-waiting to Mary I who, after the Queen's death, married Gómez Suárez de Figueroa y Córdoba, 1st Duke of Feria and went to live in Spain, where she would become a magnet for exiled English Catholics. She maintained a correspondence with Queen Elizabeth, and also corresponded with contacts sympathetic to the Catholic cause in England. Within Spain she championed the cause of exiled English fallen on hard times. On her husband's death in 1571 she took over the management of his estates. She died in Spain on 13 January 1612 and was buried at the monastery of Santa Clara in Zafra.

== Early life ==
Jane Dormer, born at Eythrope near Waddesdon, Buckinghamshire on 6 January 1538, the daughter of Sir William Dormer (d. 17 May 1575) of Wing, Buckinghamshire, by his first wife, Mary Sidney (died 10 February 1542), the daughter of Sir William Sidney of Penshurst, Kent, and Anne Pakenham. She had two brothers, Thomas Dormer and Robert Dormer, and a sister, Anne Dormer, who married Sir Walter Hungerford. She was the granddaughter of Sir Robert Dormer (died 2 or 8 July 1552) and Jane Newdigate, the daughter of John Newdigate (d. 15 August 1528), esquire, of Harefield, Middlesex, by Amphyllis Neville (d. 15 July 1544). Jane Newdigate's brother was the Catholic martyr, Sebastian Newdigate.

Jane Dormer was born during the reign of Henry VIII, when her family was split by the religious controversy caused by the ongoing Reformation. On the one side, her father Sir William Dormer's family (moderately prosperous Buckinghamshire landowners and wool merchants) remained staunchly Catholic. However, her mother Mary Sidney's family embraced Protestantism. Jane was raised broadly outside this latter influence from the death of her mother in 1542, but she spent her youth not only in the household of her paternal grandmother but also as a playmate of the young Edward VI, who, she wrote in her memoirs, was very fond of her and reportedly said after having beaten her at cards, "Now your king is gone Jane, I shall be good enough for you".

== Marriage and family ==
Jane's faith and royal connections would take her to the heart of power. Despite an age gap of over 20 years and at the age of just 16, Jane became one of Queen Mary I's closest friends and confidantes. The poet Richard Edwardes described eight ladies at Mary's court, writing:

Dormer is a darling, and of such lively hue,
That whoso feeds his eyes on her may soon her beauty rue.

Queen Mary was reluctant to see her married, so she could stay at court. Edward Courtenay showed interest, amongst others, but Mary deemed him unworthy.

In the end she made her own Spanish match by marrying Don Gomez Suarez de Figueroa of Cordova, Duke of Feria, a close confidante of Philip II of Spain and his first ambassador to Elizabeth I's court. (Note: Note: "Don", in this article, is used as a title, as in "Sir". It is not a first name, and is ordinarily written as "D" or "don"--i.e., D. Gomez Suarez de Figueroa y Cordova, Duke of Feria. Gomez was the Duke's first name. Gomez may also be a surname.) Jane and Don Gomez had first met on King Philip's arrival in England in 1554; Mary had strongly encouraged the match, but it had been postponed to await Philip's return to the country after campaigns abroad. This never occurred, and the two were not married until after Mary's death in 1558.

The Duke and Duchess of Feria's union had two sons: Lorenzo Suárez de Figueroa y Córdoba (born in 1559), who would succeed his father as Duke of Feria, and Pedro (born in 1565; lived only three months).

The Duke of Feria was quick to perceive how Elizabeth's accession would change the religious tide in England and, despite his formal role as Spanish ambassador, he refused to attend Elizabeth's coronation in a public rejection of expected Protestant elements in the service.

Jane Dormer delivered some of the jewels of Queen Mary to Elizabeth I in 1559. Elizabeth's ladies in waiting, Blanche Parry, Lady Knollys and Margery Norris scrutinised the returned jewels for defects and losses.

== Spain ==
When the Duke of Feria was replaced as ambassador in 1559, he and Jane returned to the continent with a mixed retinue of monks and nuns, her cousin Margaret Harington, and Susan Clarencieux who was one of Mary's former ladies-in-waiting. The English ambassador Nicholas Throckmorton sent John Somers and Robert Jones to talk to them near the Château d'Amboise in France in April 1560. They met Mary, Queen of Scots, and Francis II of France. Susan Clarencieux spoke to Throckmorton, saying they were loyal subjects of Elizabeth I but were travelling to Spain for their religious conscience.

Once in Spain, Jane became a lightning rod for exiled English Catholics. Jane kept up an infrequent correspondence with Elizabeth I, sending William Harington to her with a letter and a token of good will, perhaps a gift of jewellery, in August 1568. Jane received letters from four popes and maintained numerous other contacts sympathetic to the Roman Catholic cause in England, and within Spain she was a champion of exiled English fallen on hard times.

On her husband's death in 1571 she took over the management of his estates. The Spanish respected her for her political understanding, and 1592 she was a strong candidate to take up the governorship of Flanders.

== Death and legacy ==
The Duchess's health never recovered from an accident in 1609, and she was bedridden from the start of 1611 – planning ahead she had already prepared a coffin which she kept in the house. At her death on 13 January 1612 in Spain, she was attended by seven priests. She was buried at the monastery of Santa Clara in Zafra on 26 January.

Her son Lorenzo Suárez de Figueroa y Córdoba succeeded his father as Duke of Feria.
