= Walter Hungerford (Knight of Farley) =

English landowner

Sir Walter Hungerford
- Died: December 1596
- Spouses: Anne Basset; Anne Dormer
- Issue: 2 children by first wife (names unknown); Edmund Hungerford; Susan Hungerford; Lucy Hungerford; Jane Hungerford; 3 illegitimate sons 1 illegitimate daughter
- Father: Walter Hungerford, 1st Baron Hungerford of Heytesbury
- Mother: Susan Danvers

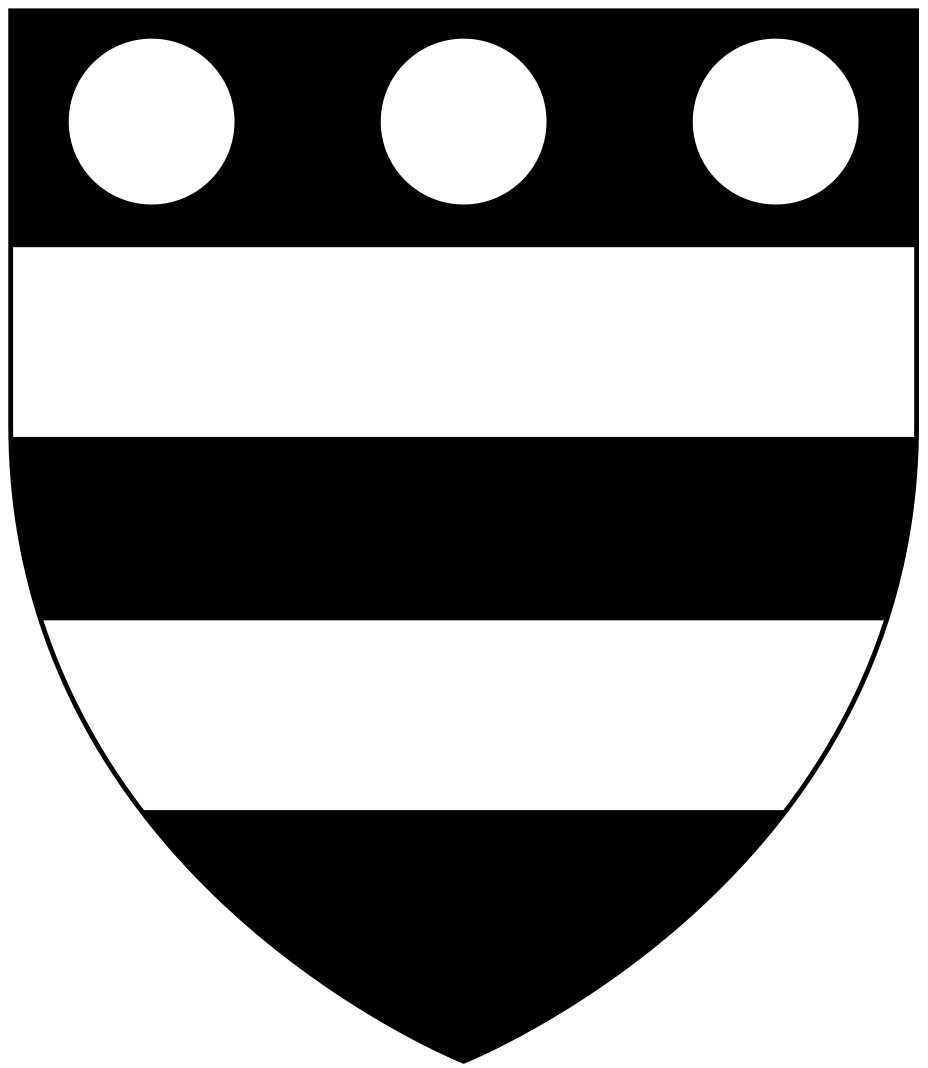
Arms of Hungerford: Sable, two bars argent in chief three plates

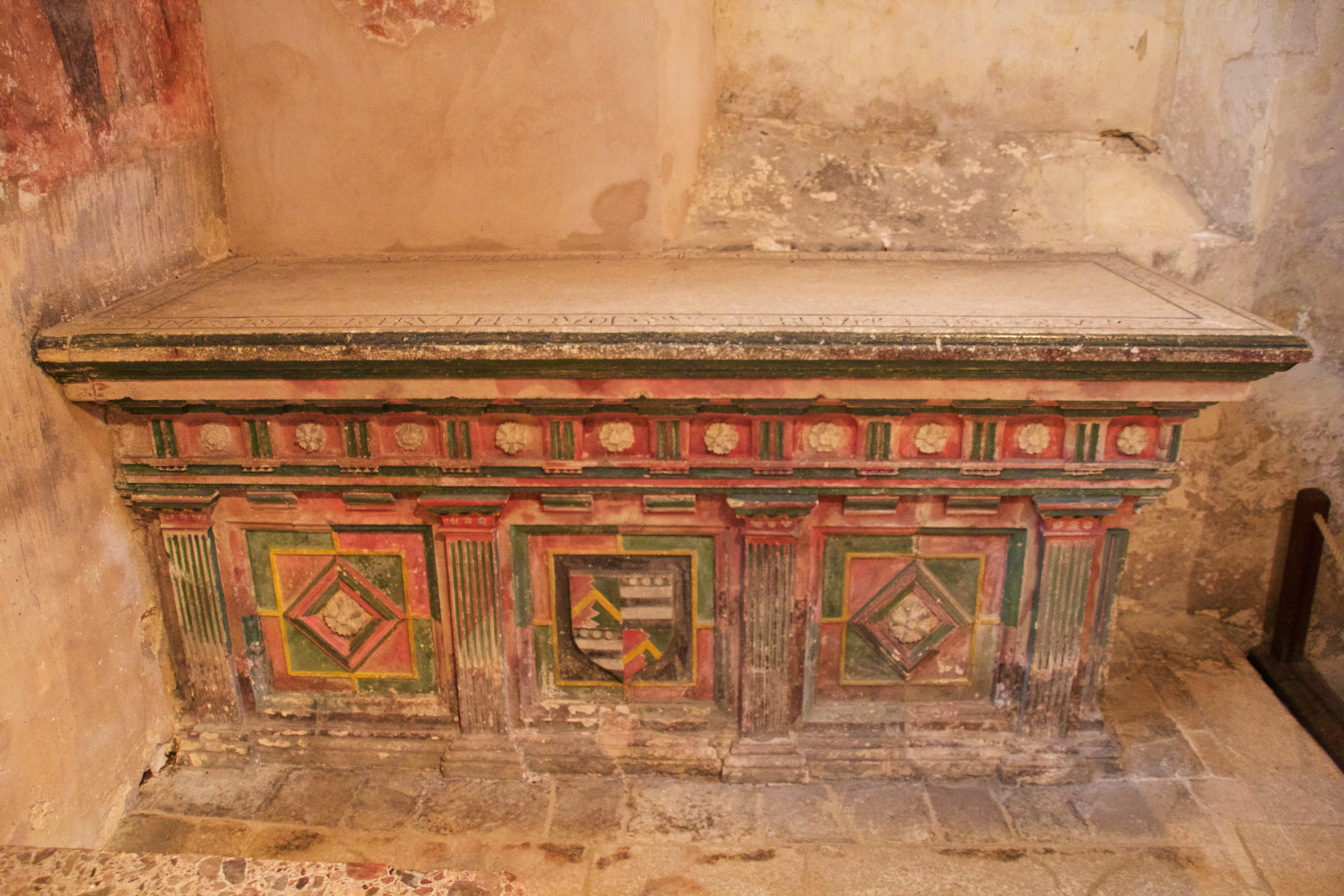
Chest tomb with inscribed ledger stone of Sir Walter Hungerford (died December 1596) and of his son Edward Hungerford (d. 1585), Farleigh Hungerford Castle Chapel, displaying arms of Heytesbury (Per pale indented gules and vert, a chevron or) quartering FitzJohn (Sable, two bars argent in chief two plates), which arms were later adopted by the Hungerford family

Sir Walter Hungerford, Knight of Farley (died December 1596) was an English landowner. In his lifetime he was popularly referred to as the "Knight of Farley" for his renowned sporting abilities. In his youth he recovered the lands forfeited by his father's attainder, and was favoured by Queen Mary I, whose Maid of Honour, Anne Basset, was his first wife. In 1568, he sued his second wife, Anne (née Dormer), for divorce. He failed to prove the scandalous grounds he alleged against her, but chose to be imprisoned in the Fleet rather than support his wife or pay the costs awarded against him by the court.

== Biography ==
Walter Hungerford was the only son of Walter Hungerford, 1st Baron Hungerford of Heytesbury, and his first wife, Susan Danvers, daughter of Sir John Danvers of Dauntsey, Wiltshire, by the heiress Anne Stradling.

Hungerford succeeded his father on 28 July 1540. By an Act of Parliament in 1542 he was restored in blood, but did not immediately regain his father's title and lands. He was granted land by Edward VI in 1552, and, in 1554, Queen Mary I granted him the confiscated estate of Farleigh Hungerford, in Somerset, when the attainder on his father was reversed. He was knighted in the same year. He was Sheriff of Wiltshire in 1557, 1572, 1581 and 1587.

Hungerford excelled at field sports, and "was present at the first recorded horse race in Wiltshire in 1585".

In 1568, he sued his second wife for divorce, alleging that she had tried to poison him some years earlier, and that she had committed adultery with William Darrell of Littlecote, Wiltshire, and had had a child by him. Hungerford failed to prove the allegations in court, and subsequently spent three years in the Fleet Prison for his refusal to support his wife or to pay the £250 in costs awarded against him in the divorce suit. Two letters from Lady Hungerford, written in 1570, speak of her impoverished circumstances.

Through the offices of the Earl of Leicester, Lady Hungerford obtained licence in 1571 to visit her dying grandmother, Jane Dormer (née Newdigate), who was living in the English Catholic community at Louvain. She never returned to England. On 29 March 1586, she wrote from Namur to Sir Francis Walsingham, requesting that he protect her daughters from Hungerford's attempts to disinherit them.

In his will, dated 14 November 1595, Hungerford left two farms to his mistress, Margery Bright, and the residue of his estate to his half brother, Sir Edward Hungerford, with remainder to the male heirs of "any woman" he should "afterwards marry". Hungerford died in December 1596, and was succeeded by his half brother, whom Hungerford's widow, Anne, and his mistress, Margery Bright, both sued for dower. Lady Hungerford was granted a generous dower, and died at Louvain in 1603.

Two portraits of Hungerford are shown as engravings in Sir Richard Hoare's Modern Wiltshire, Heytesbury Hundred; both were owned in Hoare's time by Richard Pollen, esquire, of Rodbourne, Wiltshire. In the earlier portrait, dated 1560, Hungerford is depicted in full armour, 'and about him are all the appliances of hunting and hawking, in which the inscription on the picture states that he excelled'. The later portrait, dated 1574, shows him with a hawk on his wrist.

== Family ==
Hungerford married firstly Anne Basset, Maid of Honour to Queen Mary I, and daughter of Sir John Bassett of Umberleigh, Devon. On 11 June 1554 Robert Swyfte reported the wedding in a letter to Francis Talbot, 5th Earl of Shrewsbury, as having taken place "on Thursday last...at which day the Queen shewed herself very pleasant, commanding all mirth and pastime". There were two children of the marriage, who both died without issue.

He married secondly, by 5 May 1558, Anne Dormer, sister of Jane Dormer, and elder daughter of Sir William Dormer by his first wife, Mary Sidney, daughter of Sir William Sidney, by whom he had a son and three daughters:

- Edmund Hungerford, who died in December 1585 without issue.
- Susan Hungerford, who married firstly Michael Ernley of Bishops Cannings, Wiltshire, secondly John Moring, and thirdly Sir Carew Reynolds.
- Lucy Hungerford, who married firstly Sir John St. John of Lydiard Tregoze, by whom she had a daughter, Barbara St John, who married Sir Edward Villiers and was the mother of William Villiers, 2nd Viscount Grandison and the grandmother of Barbara Villiers. Barbara St John married secondly Sir Anthony Hungerford, of Black Bourton.
- Jane Hungerford, who married Sir John Carne of Ewenny, Glamorganshire.

Hungerford also had mistress, Margery Bright, by whom he had two sons and a daughter born during his lifetime, as well as a posthumous son. Hungerford married Margery Bright after making his will, having heard rumours that his wife was dead.
