= E. F. Blakiston =

British novelist (1819–1879)

- Born: 1819; Mobberley Old Hall
- Died: August 1, 1879 (aged 59–60); Knutsford
- Occupation: Novelist
- Parent(s): John Blakiston; Jane Wright

Eleanor Frances Blakiston (1819 – August 1, 1879) was a British novelist.

Eleanor Blakiston was born in 1819 at Mobberley Hall in Cheshire. She was the eldest daughter of Jane Wright and John Blakiston, second son of Sir Matthew Blakiston, 2nd Baronet, military memoirist, and survivor of the Vellore Mutiny. She published three romance novels in the 1860s. She died on 1 August 1879 in Knutsford.

== Bibliography ==
- Great Catches: or, Grand Matches. 2 vol. London: Saunders and Otley, 1861.
- Hearts are Trumps. 2 vol. London: Saunders and Otley, 1862.
- Do Well and Doubt Not: A Novel. 3 vol. London: T. C. Newby, 1867.
