= Edward Hungerford (died 1607) =

Member of the Parliament of England

Sir Edward Hungerford (born before 1532, died 1607) was an English landowner and politician who sat in the House of Commons in 1601.

== Biography ==
Edward Hungerford, born by 1532, was the son of Walter Hungerford, 1st Baron Hungerford of Heytesbury and his second wife, Alice Sandys, the daughter of William Sandys, 1st Baron Sandys.

He was a gentleman pensioner by May 1558. He was a J.P. for Wiltshire by 1583. From 1594 to 1595 he was High Sheriff of Wiltshire. He was an extensive landowner when he succeeded to the estates of his half-brother Sir Walter Hungerford (Knight of Farley) in about 1596. In 1598 he became collector for the loan. He supplied a light horse for Ireland in 1600 and 1601.

After the rebellion of the Earl of Essex, he was given custody of his relative William, Lord Sandys. He was knighted in 1601, and elected Member of Parliament for Wiltshire.

In 1602, he purchased the manor of Corsham, and in 1604 was granted further manors in Berkshire, Cornwall, Somerset and Wiltshire which had formerly belonged to his father (whose lands had been forfeited along with his life when he was found guilty of being a traitor). Hungerford made his will on 1 December 1607, and died four days later.

== Family ==
Hungerford married firstly, after 1574, Jane, daughter of Anthony Hungerford of Down Ampney, Gloucestershire and widow of William Forster of Aldermaston, Berkshire; and secondly Cecily Tufton (d. 1653), daughter of Sir John Tufton, of Hothfield, Kent, but died without issue. His widow married Francis Manners, 6th Earl of Rutland.

== Notes ==
Parliament of England
| Preceded by Sir William Eyre; Henry Baynton | Member of Parliament for Wiltshire; 1601; With: Edmund Carey | Succeeded by Sir Francis Popham; John Thynne |
