= John Dynham, 1st Baron Dynham =

English peer and politician

John Dynham
- 1st Baron Dynham
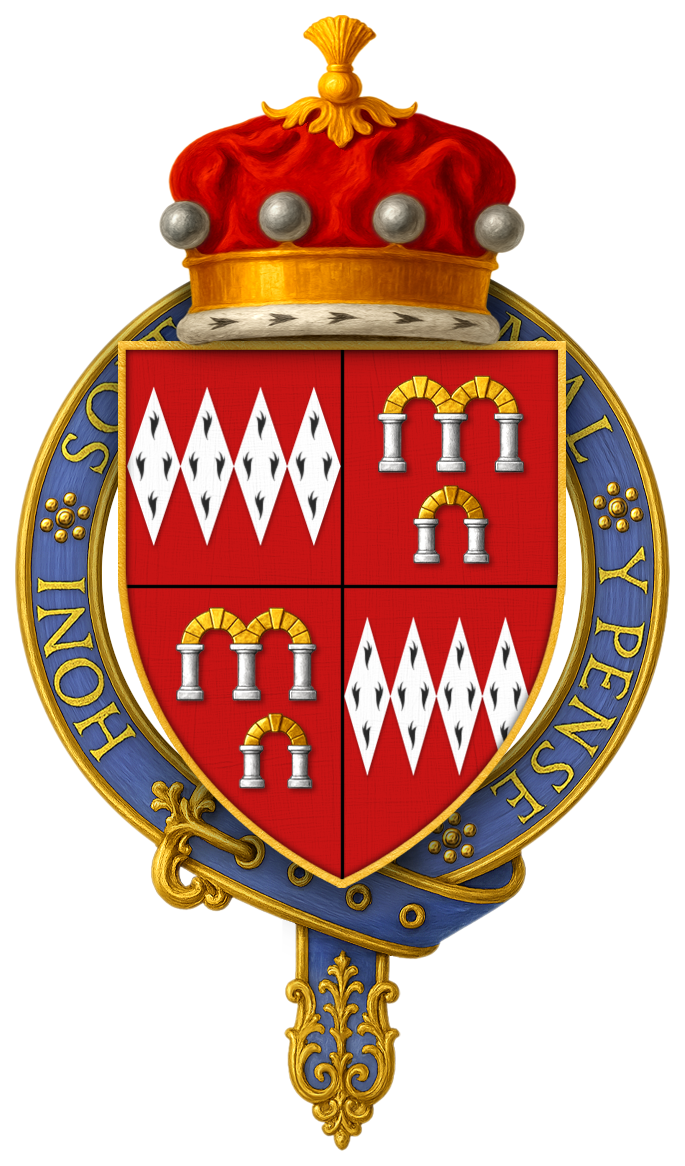
- Arms of Lord Dynham: Quarterly 1st and 4th Gules four fusils conjoined in fess Ermine for Dynham; 2nd and 3rd Gules a double arch and an arch Or the columns Argent for Arches.
- Tenure: 1467–1501
- Born: c. 1433; Nutwell, Devon
- Died: 28 January 1501; Lambeth, Surrey
- Buried: London Greyfriars
- Offices: Lord High Treasurer of England; Lord Chancellor of Ireland
- Spouses: Elizabeth FitzWalter, 8th Baroness FitzWalter; Elizabeth Willoughby
- Issue: George Dinham; Philippa Dinham ill. Thomas Dynham
- Parents: John Dinham; Joan Arches

John Dynham, 1st Baron Dynham, KG (c. 1433–1501) of Nutwell in the parish of Woodbury and of Hartland, both in Devon, was an English peer and politician. He served as Lord High Treasurer of England and Lord Chancellor of Ireland. He was one of the few men to have served as councillor to Kings Edward IV, Richard III and Henry VII and was trusted by all of them.

== Origins ==
He was born at Nutwell, the eldest son and heir of Sir John Dinham (1406–1458) of Nutwell and Hartland, by his wife, Joan Arches (died 1497), sister and heiress of John Arches and daughter of Sir Richard Arches (died 1417), a member of parliament for Buckinghamshire in 1402, of Eythrope, Cranwell (both in the parish of Waddesdon) and Little Kimble, Buckinghamshire, whose arms were: Gules, three arches argent. The Dynhams had been seated at Nutwell since about 1122 and were one of the leading gentry families in Devon. His father died in 1458, but his mother was in occupation of the lands until her own death in 1496/7.

== Career ==
=== Yorkist ===
His service to the House of York began in 1459 when the future Edward IV and his Neville relatives, fleeing the disastrous Battle of Ludford Bridge took refuge with his mother, for which Edward later rewarded her; John himself bought the ship on which they fled to Calais. He was attainted by the Coventry Parliament and led two successful raids against the royal forces at Sandwich, Kent. During the first raid, he captured Baron Rivers, Richard Woodville (later Richard Woodville, 1st Earl Rivers), thus producing the (in retrospect) comical scene where Rivers was humiliated for his low birth by his future son-in-law, King Edward IV.

=== Under Edward IV ===
He was made High Sheriff of Devon and Lord Chancellor of Ireland in 1460. After Edward IV's accession, he became a member of the privy council and was created Baron Dynham in 1467, although no grant of lands accompanied the title, as was usual. Ross suggests that he did not become a leading figure in government until the death of Humphrey Stafford, Earl of Devon. During the years of crisis from 1469 to 1471, Dynham remained wholly loyal to Edward, and following Edward's return to power became one of the foremost members of the Government; he was Commander-in-Chief of naval forces during the brief Anglo-French War in 1475.

On the other hand, the Crown was somewhat grudging with grants of land, his estates being confined to Devon and Cornwall. Nor did he have a powerful network of family alliances: two of his sisters married into the Carew and Arundell families who were of purely local importance; the others married into the Zouche and Fitzwarin families, who were peers but not, until the accession of Richard III, of wide influence.

=== Under Richard III ===
After Richard III's accession, Dynham continued to flourish, becoming Lieutenant of Calais. In that capacity, he recaptured Hammes Castle, which had defected to Henry VII, but was criticised for allowing the garrison to depart. His marriage connections became temporarily useful. John, 7th Lord Zouche became his brother-in-law after marrying Dynham's sister, Joan. Zouche was one of the up-and-coming men in Richard's reign, but his prospects were later ruined by the Battle of Bosworth.

=== Under Henry VII ===
After Richard's death, he remained at Calais until it became clear that Henry VII bore him no ill-will. In fact, Chrimes suggests that Henry was anxious to obtain the services of a man with such a record of service and loyalty to the Crown.

While the Zouche connection had been useful, Dynham acquired a new patron in Lord Willoughby de Broke, his second wife's father, who was Steward of the Royal Household. Certainly, Dynham flourished under Henry; he was made a Knight of the Garter, and was Lord Treasurer from 1486 until his death: he took his duties at the Exchequer very seriously and spent most of his time at Lambeth for convenience. He received several grants and sat on numerous commissions. He was one of the judges who tried the rebels after the Cornish Rebellion of 1497.

His career did not suffer from the execution for treason of his stepson Lord FitzWalter in 1495; nor the attainder of his brother-in-law Lord Zouche; he was given an allowance to support his impoverished sister Lady Zouche, and Zouche after years of disgrace was eventually restored to a measure of favour.

He died at his home in Lambeth, Surrey, on 28 January 1501, and was buried in the London Greyfriars. He had no surviving legitimate children, and his three brothers having all predeceased him, the title died with him. One of his brothers, Oliver Dynham, died as Archdeacon of Surrey in 1500.

== Marriage and children ==
Arms of FitzWalter: Or, a fess between two chevrons gules

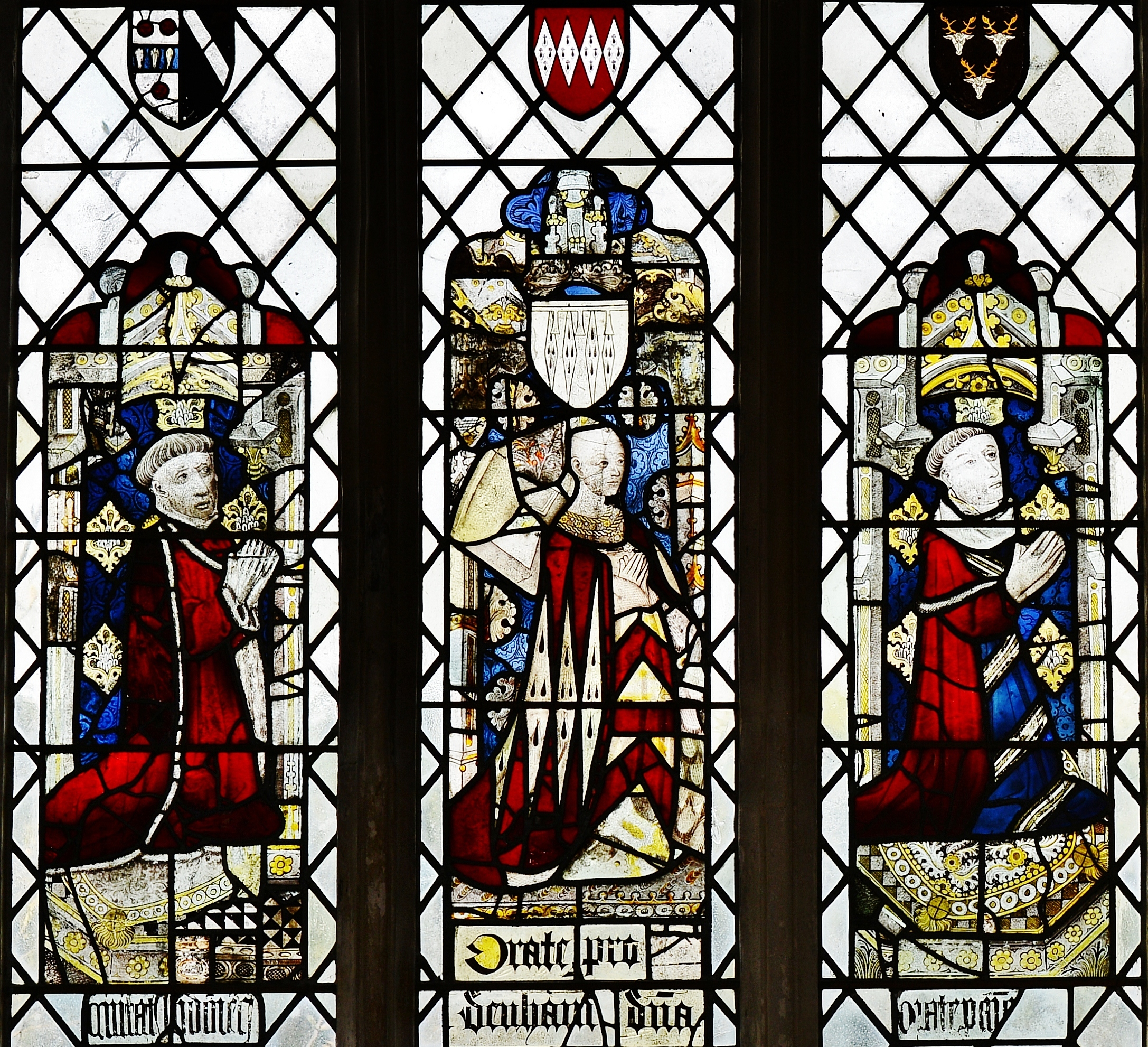
Stained glass window in Long Melford Church in Suffolk, the central figure in which is Elizabeth FitzWalter, 1st wife of John Dinham, 1st Baron Dinham. She displays the arms of Dinham on her outer mantle and the arms of FitzWalter on the front of her inner garment. Inscription below: Orate pro Denham d(omi)na ("Pray ye all for Lady Dinham")

John Dynham married twice:

- Firstly to Elizabeth FitzWalter, suo jure 8th Baroness FitzWalter (1430–pre.1485), widow of John Radcliffe. Her estates passed on her death to her son from her first marriage, the 9th Baron FitzWalter, (attainted for treason in 1495).
- Secondly, around 1485, he married Elizabeth Willoughby (died pre-1510), a daughter of Robert Willoughby, 1st Baron Willoughby de Broke, who survived him and remarried to William FitzAlan, 18th Earl of Arundel. By his second wife he had at least two children who died young:
  - George Dinham, died young;
  - Philippa Dinham, died young.

== Mistresses ==
He also had an illegitimate son, Thomas Dynham (died 1519), who was granted lands in Eythrope, Buckinghamshire, and who married Joan Ormond, eldest daughter of John Ormond (died 1503) and Joan Chaworth.

== Succession ==
As he died without surviving children, his estates, which included Nutwell, Kingskerswell and Hartland, Devon, along with Souldern, Oxfordshire (inherited from Arches family), descended to the heirs of his four surviving sisters (a fifth sister, Edith, appears to have predeceased him, leaving no issue):

- Margery Dinham (d.13 December 1471), eldest sister, who married Nicholas IV Carew (1424–1470) of Mohuns Ottery in the parish of Luppitt, Devon. His purbeck marble chest tomb survives in the Chapel of St Nicholas in Westminster Abbey, the ledger stone of which bore a Latin inscription, now effaced. The Devonshire biographer Prince (d.1723) wrote concerning this monument "To whose memory an antient plain tomb of gray marble is there still seen erected with an inscription in brass round the ledg, and some coats of arms on the pedestal". The inscription and arms were still remaining in 1733, but had disappeared by 1877. The Latin epitaph was recorded by Prince as follows:

Orate pro animabus Nicolai Baronis quondam de Carew et Dominae Margaritae uxoris eius filiae Johannis Domini Dinham, militis; qui quidem Nicolaus obiit sexto die mensis Decembris anno dom(ini) 1470. Et praedicta Domina Margareta obiit 13 die mensis Decembris anno 1471.

This may be translated into English as follows: "Pray for the souls of Nicholas, sometime Baron Carew, and of the Lady Margaret his wife, daughter of John, Lord Dinham, Knight; which Nicholas died on the 6th day of the month of December in the year of our Lord 1470 and the aforesaid Lady Margaret died on the 13th day of the month of December in the year 1471".

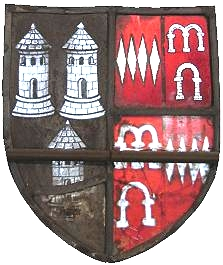
Arms of Sapcotes impaling Dinham, Bampton Church

- Elizabeth Dinham (died 19 October 1516), second sister, who married firstly Fulk Bourchier, 10th Baron FitzWarin (died 18 September 1479), feudal baron of Bampton in Devon, and secondly Sir John Sapcotes (died 5 January 1501) of Elton, Huntingdonshire. She married thirdly Sir Thomas Brandon (died 27 January 1510). In a stained-glass window of Bampton Church are visible the arms of Sapcotes (or Shapcott) Sable, three dovecotes argent impaling quarterly of four, 1st & 4th: Gules, four fusils ermine (Dinham), 2nd & 3rd Gules, three arches argent (Arches, for Sir Richard Arches (died 1417) of Eythrope, Cranwell and Little Kimble, Buckinghamshire, whose daughter Joan Arches (died 1497) was the wife of Sir John Dinham (1406–1458), and thus was Elizabeth Dinham's mother.
- Joan Dinham, third sister, wife of John la Zouche, 7th Baron Zouche, 8th Baron St Maur (died 23 June 1526).
- Katherine Dinham, fourth sister, who married Sir Thomas Arundell (died 8 February 1485) of Lanherne, St. Mawgan-in-Pyder, Cornwall. She was the mother of Sir John Arundell (1474–1545).
- Edith Dinham, Gentlewoman to Lady Margaret Beaufort, mother of King Henry VII. She predeceased her brother and died childless, having married Thomas Fowler, Usher of the Chamber to King Edward IV. Her monumental brass survives in Christ's College Chapel, Cambridge, (founded by Lady Margaret Beaufort in 1505) and shows the arms of Dynham quartering Arches.

== Heraldic tapestry ==
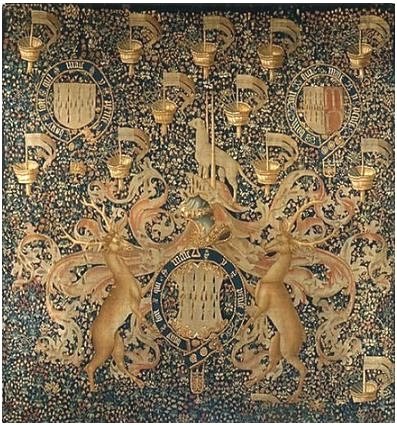
Flemish tapestry (c.1497-1501) showing heraldry of Lord Dynham. Metropolitan Museum of Art, New York

A wool and silk tapestry manufactured in the Southern Netherlands exists in The Cloisters Collection in the Cloisters Collection of the Metropolitan Museum of Art in New York that illustrates Lord Dynham's armorial bearings and heraldic badges set against a millefleurs backdrop. The tapestry was made after Lord Dynham's election as a knight to the Order of the Garter in 1487, as the blue emblem of the Garter has been included in the panel. The weaving comprises the following inscribed motto: hony soit qui male y pense (typically spelled: Honi soit qui mal y pense), serving as a terminus a quo for the dating of the tapestry. The tapestry could not have been ordered after 1501, the year of his death, and also functions as a terminus post quem. Scholars believe it was commissioned between 1487 and 1501. It is possible that this panel was ordered from the Tournai tapestry dealers Pasquier Grenier and his son, Jean Grenier. They supplied tapestries to King Henry VII in 1486 and 1488.

On 22 September 1486, King Edward IV of England ordered his then Treasurer, Lord Dynham to grant Pasquier, his son Jean, and their workers protection and licenses to import tapestries, and other textile objects into England. Two years later, in 1488, King Edward permitted Jean Pasquier to import into the country, duty free, altar cloths and tapestries, and according to Bonnie (1962) Dinham may have ordered one for himself at the same time.

The central image of the tapestry is an escutcheon in the shape of a jousting tournament targe surrounded by a blue Garter. The coat of arms represented is that of the Dynhams of Devonshire and has been described as canting arms, since the two harts likely served as a visual reference to Hartland Abbey one of the family's oldest possessions. The two harts rampant support the central a coat of arms with their forehooves. The complete achievement of the coat of arms is described as: "on a chapeau, upturned gules ermine, an ermine statant between two lighted candles proper."

Two more coats of arms appear in the upper corners of the tapestry. The one in the upper left corner is a repeat of the one seen in the center and is also surrounded by the Garter. By contrast, the one in the upper right corner is different in that in the dexter half of the shield has the arms of Dynham "four lozenges ermine" and on the sinister side the arms of Dynham "impaling the arms of Arches, which are gules, three arches argent," and is again enclosed by the Garter Scholars believe that this shield in the upper right represents the arms of Lord Dynham's mother.

The family Badge of the Dynhams was the head of a hart, again in allusion to Hartland Abbey, Lord Dynham's personal badge comprises: "a topcastle of a warship, broken at the mast, with five javelins resting inside the structure against the railing, and flying a swallow-tailed pennant with red and white streamers and a cross of Saint George next to the staff" and is repeated eleven times throughout the millefleurs ground, which was originally dark green, but appears blue today. Most scholars agree that the badge of the topcastle is a reference to Lord Dynham's naval career spanning the reign of five English Kings (from Henry VI to Henry VII) and is perhaps symbolized by the five javelins that rest inside the topcastle.

The tapestry has been cut down on all four sides, and it is thought that around 48 inches of it were cut from the bottom portion, so that the original panel would have been closer to 16.5–17 feet in height.

== Notes ==
Political offices
Preceded by The Earl of Rutland Deputy: The Earl of Shrewsbury	Lord Chancellor of Ireland; 1460–1461	Succeeded by Sir William Welles
Preceded by Sir Baldwin Fulford	High Sheriff of Devon; 1460–1461	Succeeded by John Cheney
Preceded by The Lord Audley	Lord High Treasurer; 1486–1501	Succeeded by The Earl of Surrey
Peerage of England
New title	Baron Dynham; 1467–1501	Extinct
