= John Dinham (1406–1458) =

English knight

- Arms of Dynham: Gules, four fusils in fess ermine
- Born: 1406
- Died: 25 January 1458 (aged 51–52); Nutwell, Devon, England
- Spouse: Joan Arches
- Children: 7+, including John
- Father: John Dinham
- Relatives: John Lovel (grandfather)

Sir John Dinham (or Dynham) (1406–1458) was a knight from Devonshire, England. His principal seats were at Nutwell and Kingskerswell in South Devon and Hartland in North Devon.

== Origins ==
He was the son and heir of Sir John Dinham (1359–1428) by his third wife Philippa Lovel, daughter of Sir John Lovel of Titchmarsh, Northamptonshire and Minster Lovell, Oxfordshire (d. 19 October 1414) and Eleanor la Zouche (d. 15 March 1434). The Dynhams took their name from their ancient manor of Dinan in Brittany, and had been at Nutwell since about 1122 and were one of the leading gentry families in Devon. They founded Hartland Abbey in 1169 on their manor of Hartland.

== Career ==
He was knighted at some time before 1 May 1430, at the age of 24. In 1431 he was in France with King Henry VI. In 1444 he is recorded as having been accused by the Abbot of Hartland Abbey of having broken into the Abbot's close and houses at Stoke St Nectan (next to Hartland Abbey), and having stolen his horses, sheep and cattle. A similar accusation had been made by the abbot against his father in 1397.

== Lands held ==
Dynham's landholdings in several counties included the following estates or manors: Nutwell, Kingskerswell and Hartland in Devon; Buckland Dinham in Somerset and Cardinham in Cornwall.

== Marriage and children ==
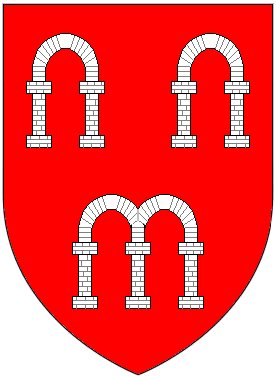
Canting arms of Arches of Eythrope and Cranwell (in Waddesdon) and Little Kimble, Buckinghamshire: Gules, three arches argent

At some date before 12 July 1434, aged 28, he married Joan Arches (died 1497) sister and heiress of John Arches and daughter of Sir Richard Arches (died 1417), MP for Buckinghamshire in 1402, of Eythrope and Cranwell (both in the parish of Waddesdon) and Little Kimble, Buckinghamshire. The merlons of the battlements of the surviving mediaeval Nutwell Chapel, attached to the present Nutwell Court, display weathered sculpted reliefs of the Dynham arms Gules, four fusils in fess ermine. His children by Joan included:

- John Dynham, 1st Baron Dynham (1433–1501), KG, Lord Treasurer of England.
- Phillipa Dynham, wife of Sir Thomas Beaumont (1401–1450) of Shirwell.
- Joan Dynham, wife of John la Zouche, 7th Baron Zouche, 8th Baron St Maur.
- Margaret Dynham (died 13 December 1470), wife of Sir Nicholas Carew (died 6 December 1470) of Ottery-Mohun, both were buried at Westminster Abbey.
- Katherine Dynham, wife of Sir Thomas Arundell in December 1473.
- Edith Dynham, wife of Thomas Fowler.
- Elizabeth Dynham (died 1516), who married three times. Her first husband was Fulk Bourchier, 10th Baron FitzWarin. She married secondly Sir John Sapcotes, and thirdly Sir Thomas Brandon.

The barony did not survive the first generation, and after Lord Dynham's death the Dynham estates were divided between the heirs of his numerous sisters.

== Death and succession ==
He died on 25 January 1458 at Nutwell and was buried in the Blackfriars, Exeter. Separate Inquisitions post mortem were held concerning his landholdings in the counties of Hampshire, Devon, Somerset, Cornwall, Oxfordshire and Buckinghamshire. His heir was his son John Dynham, 1st Baron Dynham (c. 1433 – 1501).

== Sources ==
- Chope, R. Pearse, The Book of Hartland, Torquay, 1940, Chapter V, pp. 26–37, The Dynham Family
- Cokayne, George Edward; Gibbs, Vicary; Doubleday, H. Arthur, eds. (1916). Complete peerage of England, Scotland, Ireland, Great Britain and the United Kingdom, extant, extinct or dormant (Dacre to Dysart). Vol. 4 (2nd ed.). London: The St. Catherine Press, Ltd.
