= Richard Arches =

Member of the Parliament of England

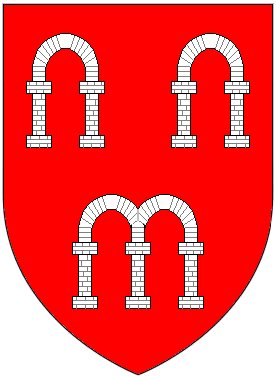
Canting arms of Arches of Eythrope and Cranwell (in Waddesdon) and Little Kimble, Buckinghamshire (also of Arches of Arches manor, East Hendred, Berkshire) : Gules, three arches argent

Sir Richard Arches (died 1417), of Eythrope, in the parish of Waddesdon, Buckinghamshire, was MP for Buckinghamshire in 1402. He was knighted before 1401.

== Origins ==
He was probably the son of Richard Arches of Eythrope (anciently Eythorpe, "Ethorp", etc.), by his wife Lucy Abberbury (or Adderbury), daughter of Sir Richard I Adderbury (c. 1331 – 1399) of Donnington Castle, Berkshire and Steeple Aston, Oxfordshire, twice MP for Oxfordshire. His family, whose name was Latinised to de Arcubus ("from the arches") had been established in Buckinghamshire since at the latest 1309, and held in that county the manors of Little Kimble, and in the parish of Waddesdon the estates of Eythrope and Cranwell.

The estate of Arches within the manor of East Hendred in Berkshire had long been held by a family which was called Arches or D'Arches Their heir was the family of Eyston. John Arches (d. circa 1405) of Arches was elected four-times as MP for Berkshire, in 1384, 1390, 1402 and 1404. A family relationship between the Arches families of Arches and Eythrope, which both bore the same canting arms of Gules, three arches argent, was suggested by Bertha Putnam in her work on Sir William Shareshull, but as was remarked upon by Woodger, her suggestion that Sir Richard Arches (died 1417) was the son of Ralph Arches, son of John Arches (d. circa 1405) of East Hendred was clearly physically impossible.

== Career ==
Between 1394 and 1395 he took part in the first military expedition to Ireland of King Richard II and was knighted soon afterwards. He was elected MP for Buckinghamshire in 1402. He was appointed a Commissioner of Array for Buckinghamshire in 1403 and served as a Justice of the Peace for Oxfordshire from 1410 to 1412. In July 1417 he embarked in King Henry V's army for the conquest of Normandy, serving in the retinue of Thomas Montagu, 4th Earl of Salisbury (1388–1428). He died in Normandy on 5 September 1417, presumably killed in action.

== Marriages and children ==
He married twice:

- Firstly, before 1410, to Joan Ardern (born circa 1375), granddaughter and co-heiress of Sir Giles Ardern (died 1376) of Drayton, Berkshire (since 1974 Oxfordshire), from whom she inherited the Oxfordshire manors of Horley, Ilbury and Wykeham. These thus became possessions of Sir Richard Arches, who moved his residence to Horley, Oxfordshire. Joan was the widow of William Greville of Horley, Oxfordshire, younger son of the great Gloucestershire wool-merchant William Greville (died 1401), of Chipping Campden, another of whose sons was the husband of Joan's sister Margaret Ardern. By Joan Ardern, Richard Arches had the following two children:
  - John Arches (born 1410), aged 7 at his father's death, who died as a child shortly after his father, without issue, leaving his sister Joan his sole heiresses.
  - Joan Arches (1410–1497), who became a substantial heiress. She was a minor aged 7 at her father's death and in 1420 disposal of her marriage was granted to Thomas Chaucer, (died 1434), son and heir of the poet Geoffrey Chaucer and 14 times MP for Oxfordshire. Chaucer had acquired in 1415 most of the lands of Sir Richard Arches' uncle Sir Richard II Adderbury (died 1416), twice MP for Oxfordshire, which included Donnington Castle and manor, Berkshire. In 1421 at the age of 11 she also became heir to the lands of her half-brother Richard Greville (died 1421), of Ilbury in Deddington, Oxfordshire, MP for Oxfordshire in 1420, her mother's son from her first marriage. Joan was married to Sir John Dinham (1406–1458) of Nutwell, Devon. Their son and heir was John Dinham, 1st Baron Dinham (1433–1501), KG; they also had at least five daughters.
- Secondly before May 1417, during the last year of his life, Arches married Joan Frome (c. 1386 – 1434), daughter and co-heiress of John Frome (died 1404) of Buckingham, Buckinghamshire and Woodlands (in Horton), Dorset, councillor to King Henry IV and 6 times MP for Dorset and once for Buckinghamshire. She was the widow of William Filliol (c. 1380 – 1416), MP and after Arches' death she remarried before March 1420 (as his 2nd wife) Sir William Cheyne (died 1442), Chief Justice of the King's Bench. Joan died on1 July 1434. She left a will dated 31 March 1420.

== Lands held ==
In Buckinghamshire:

- Oving
- Little Kimble, held from the honour of Wallingford.
- Eythrope, in the parish of Waddesdon, held from the honour of Wallingford. The Dinhams were later said to have made this estate one of their seats.
- Cranwell, in the parish of Waddesdon, held from the honour of Wallingford.
- Cuddington. Recorded in the 14th century as held by Geoffrey D'Arches. This manor descended to the Dinhams through Sir Richard Arches' daughter Joan.

Arches also inherited, or possibly purchased at reduced cost, five Oxfordshire manors from his childless uncle Sir Richard II Adderbury (died 1416), of Donnington Castle, Berkshire, twice MP for Oxfordshire. These manors were Souldern, Steeple Aston, Sibford, Ludwell, and Glympton. In addition, he acquired, via his first wife's inheritance, possession of the Oxfordshire manors of Horley, Ilbury and Wykeham.

== Succession ==
His son and heir John Arches (born 1410) died as a child soon after his father's death, and thus his heir became his daughter Joan Arches, later the wife of Sir John Dinham (1406–1458) of Nutwell, Devon. Their son and heir was John Dynham, 1st Baron Dynham (1433–1501), KG. The arms of Arches were later quartered by Lord Dinham and later by his heirs the Bourchier family, Earls of Bath.

== Sources ==
- Woodger, L.S., biography of Sir Richard Arches, published in The History of Parliament: House of Commons 1386-1421, ed. J.S. Roskell, L. Clark, C. Rawcliffe, 1993
- Cokayne, G. E. (1916). The Complete Peerage of England, Scotland, Ireland, Great Britain and the United Kingdom, extant, extinct or dormant (Dacre to Dysart). Vol. 4 (2nd ed.). London: The St Catherine Press., p. 377 (Baron Dinham)
