= MAD About Waddesdon =

Coordinates: 51.842°N 0.937°W

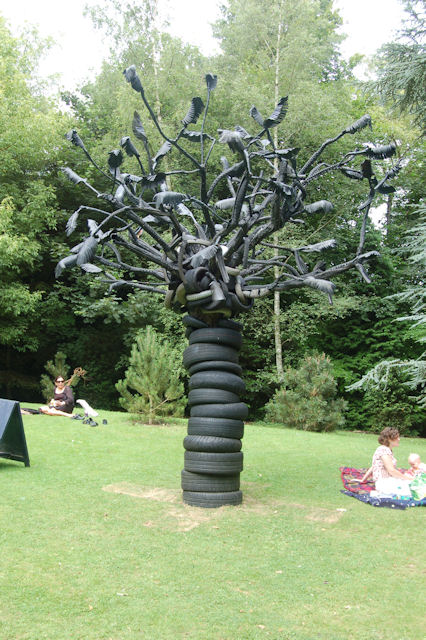
A "rubber tree" artwork at Waddesdon Manor in 2008, made by local schoolchildren and designer Ann Carrington as part of MAD About Waddesdon

MAD About Waddesdon is an annual festival of Music, Art, Drama and Dance, involving young people from local schools and community groups. It is held in the grounds of Waddesdon Manor in Buckinghamshire over a weekend at the end of June, beginning of July.

It was first held in 2006 and attracted over 10,000 visitors, with over 3,000 young people performing across four stages. Headline acts have included Katherine Jenkins, Russell Watson and Jools Holland. The festival ran every year until 2014, when it took a year off.
