= Alice Charlotte von Rothschild =

Austrian socialite (1847–1922)

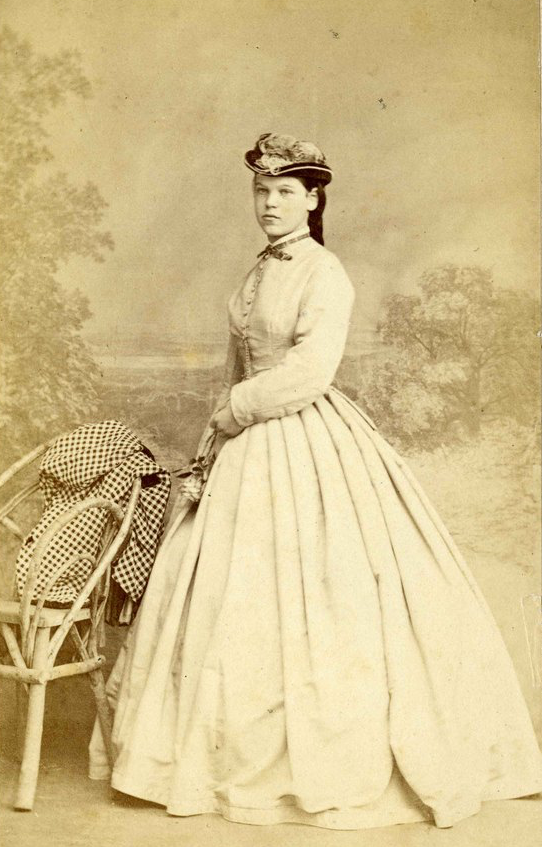
- Born: 17 February 1847; Frankfurt am Main, German Confederation
- Died: 3 May 1922 (aged 75); Paris, France
- Occupation: Socialite
- Known for: Member of the Rothschild banking family of Austria

Alice Charlotte von Rothschild (17 February 1847 – 3 May 1922), otherwise referred to as 'Miss Alice', was a socialite and member of the Rothschild banking family of Austria. Born in Frankfurt, she was the eighth and youngest child of Anselm von Rothschild (1803–1874) and Charlotte Rothschild (1807–1859) and younger sister of the British politician, Baron Ferdinand de Rothschild. She was quite young when her family moved to Vienna, where her father took over the management of the family-owned S M von Rothschild bank.

== Family life ==
Alice von Rothschild's mother was the daughter of Nathan Mayer Rothschild of London and as a result, the family would have close connections to the English branch of the Rothschild family. Her brother Ferdinand, with whom she was believed to be very close, studied at Cambridge University and married an English cousin.

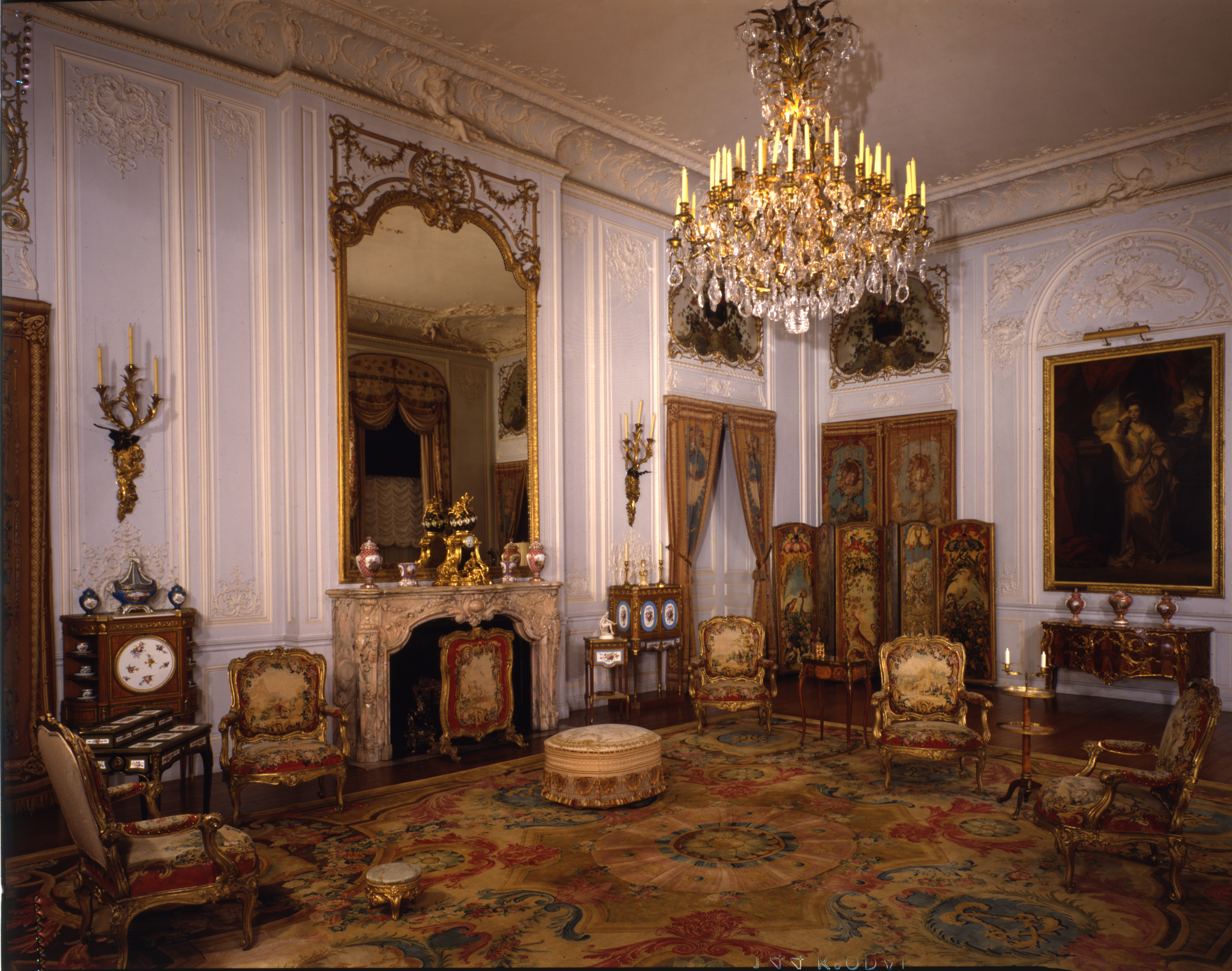
The Grey Drawing Room at Waddesdon Manor, which Alice inherited after her brother's death.

Her mother died when she was twelve and her busy father travelled constantly. She lived with various relations during her childhood and was often alone. She moved to England when she was 19. Photographs of her as a girl and a young woman show her "with a broad brow, firm full lips and a strong chin, not conventionally pretty, but full of character". This sense of character is what makes Miss Alice so renowned for her formidable reputation. Girouard states that two events helped convert the young, girlish woman to her strong older self, the first being hostess for her brother Ferdinand, at Leighton House and then at Waddesdon Manor - and the second that the death of her father in 1874 made her a wealthy woman. Much to the family's surprise, she was left the original Rothschild family home in Frankfurt alongside a house and estate at the Grunburg, just outside.

She lived in Piccadilly, London in a property adjacent to that of Ferdinand. When in 1874 he began the construction of Waddesdon Manor in Buckinghamshire England, Alice acquired a nearby property at Eythrope for herself. There, between 1876 and 1879, she had a park and garden created and a house built near the river called Eythrope Pavilion. Although, as Alice had suffered from rheumatic fever, she had been advised not to sleep near water as dampness would aggravate her health problem meaning her house was built for solely for daytime occupation. Therefore, at nights she returned to stay at Waddesdon Manor.

Her personality was to be very independent, exacting, self-assured and did not see the need to conform to society's expectation that women would marry. She was musical, well read, an accomplished horse rider and spoke several languages. She also collected art and had spectacular gardens created for her residences in England and France, at Villa Victoria, Grasse. She asked for her papers to be destroyed after her death, but many survive.

== Inheritance ==
In late 1898, following the death of her brother, Baron Ferdinand de Rothschild, Alice inherited Waddesdon Manor and his London House. During World War I she had the formal gardens at Waddesdon and Eythrope given over to the growing of vegetables for the less fortunate. The Eythrope Pavilion was still maintained but now as even more of an occasional retreat. As her health declined she spent more of her time at her magnificent château, "Villa Victoria", in the balmier climate of the town of Grasse in the Alpes-Maritimes département in France. Her property was located about 12 miles (19 km) inland, north of the Mediterranean coast and here she created an enormous garden that employed more than one hundred gardeners. She wanted to be near family, and her château was close to Cannes, where her cousin Laura Thérèse von Rothschild, widow of James-Edouard de Rothschild owned the Villa Rothschild, Cannes, and only 34 miles (55 km) from Villa Ephrussi de Rothschild, the seaside estate owned by another cousin, Béatrice Ephrussi de Rothschild.

Queen Victoria holidayed in Grasse and visited Villa Victoria. According to the book The Rothschild Gardens by Miriam Rothschild, at the turn of the century, Alice Rothschild spent the equivalent of nearly £500,000 annually on her gardens and grounds at Grasse. Imperious in nature, Alice was a strong-willed person who spoke her mind. According to one anecdote: "the Queen stepped on a lawn and across a flower-bed [at Waddesdon Manor], inadvertently crushing several plants. The baroness could not contain herself and roughly told the sovereign in effect to 'Get out'. Thereafter the Queen always referred to her as 'The All-Powerful One'."

== Collecting and innovating conservation ==
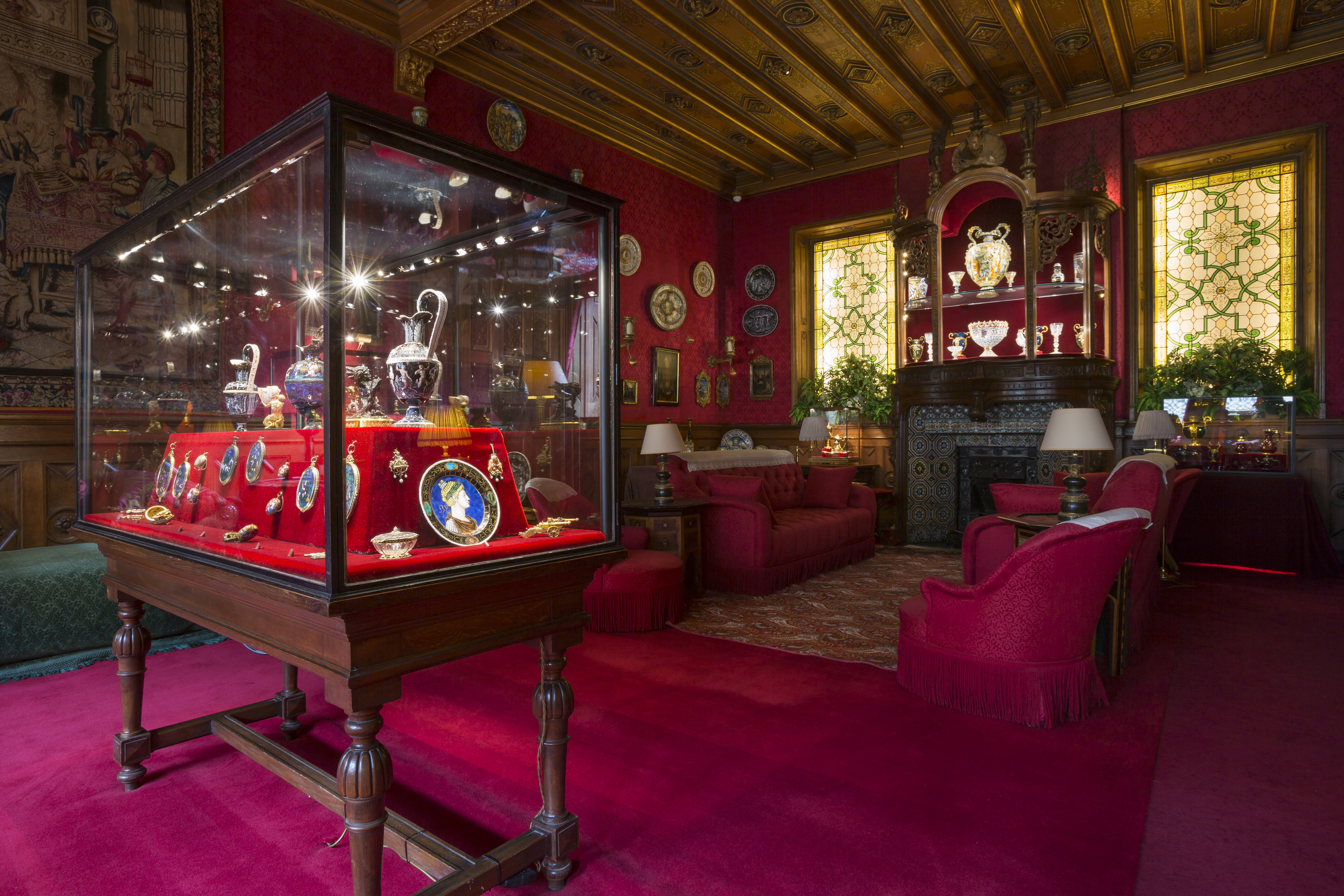
Miss Alice felt the need to add to the gap in the collection when her brother died and bequeathed the majority of his renaissance collection to the British Museum. She therefore added major pieces of armour to the armoury corridor, just outside the Smoking Room.

Like many other members of the Rothschild family, Alice Rothschild was a collector of art. While she acquired paintings, sculptures and objets d'art, Alice von Rothschild also had a unique collection of smoking pipes, including French, Spanish and Italian examples from the 17th century. The collection was donated to the town of Grasse, France on her death in 1922, where her winter property was based. The château in Grasse later became the hotel "Parc Palace", where the famous French actor Gérard Philipe was raised. Avenue Rothschild in Grasse is named in her honor.

Along these same lines, Miss Alice was also an avid and careful collector for Waddesdon Manor, and added elements to Ferdinand's previous collection in order to fill the gap left when he bequeathed much of his Renaissance artwork to the British Museum (now referred to as the Waddesdon Bequest). For instance, the helmet of the Emperor Charles V is a prominent contribution of Miss Alice's to the Armoury Corridor, upstairs in the Bachelor's Wing. She regarded herself as 'the protector' of Ferdinand's inheritance and is famous for establishing ‘Miss Alice’s Rules' – guidelines for the care and preservation of the collections which formed the foundation for conservation practices at the National Trust.

== Death and legacy ==
Alice von Rothschild died on 3 May 1922 in Paris, at the age of 75. She bequeathed the Waddesdon estate to her nephew, James Armand de Rothschild.

An exhibition about the role of von Rothschild in the history of Waddesdon Manor was held there in 2022.

== Sources ==
- International Women's Day blog article
- Who was Alice de Rothschild? blog article
- Beautiful and fantastic: Three Rothschild women as collectors blog article
- A walk amongst the beauty of Waddesdon, Bucks Herald
