= Dorothy de Rothschild =

English activist

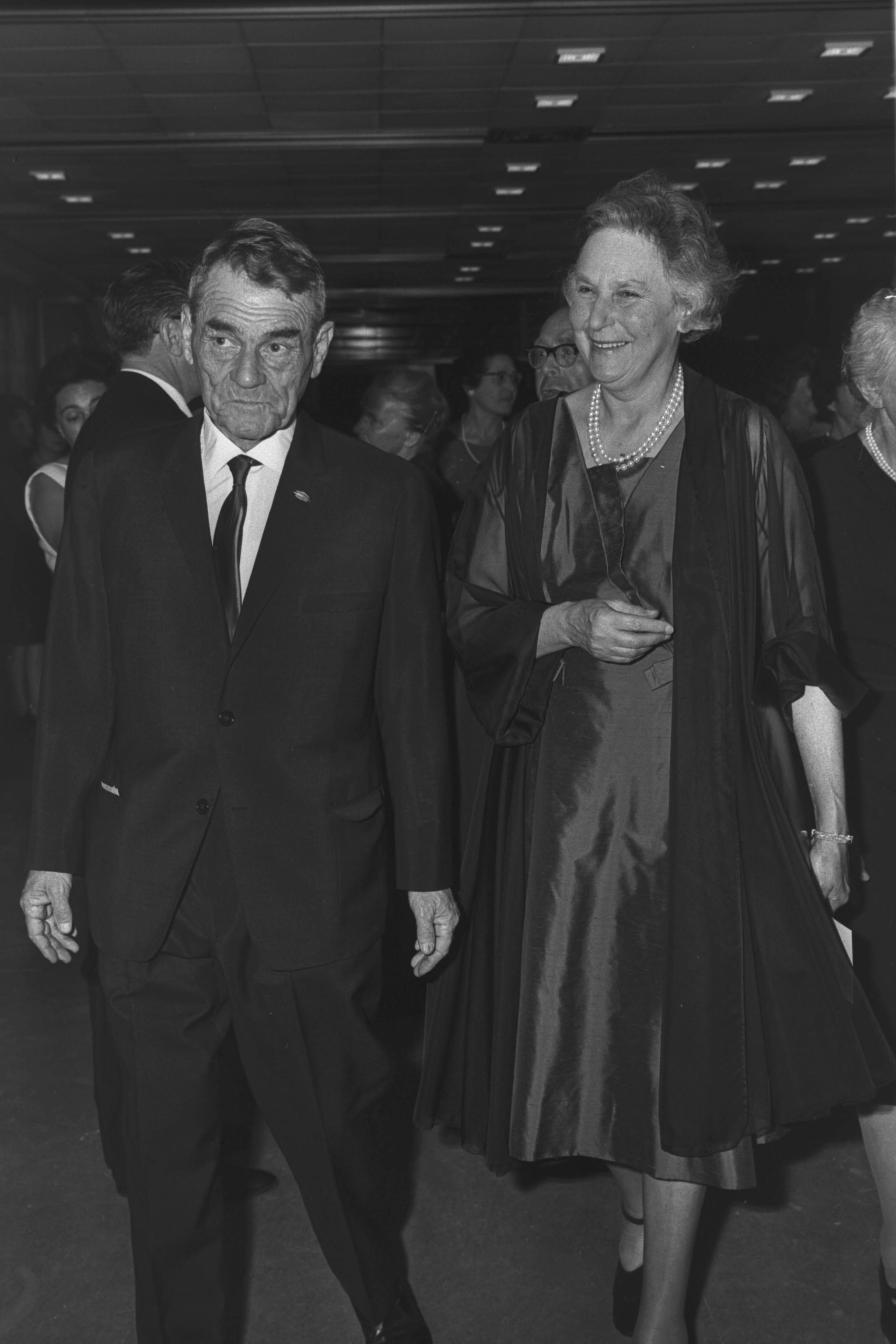
- Dorothy de Rothschild with Kadish Luz at the inauguration of the new Knesset
- Born: Mathilde Dorothy Pinto; 7 March 1895; London, England, UK
- Died: 10 December 1988 (aged 93); London, England, UK
- Resting place: Willesden Jewish Cemetery
- Known for: Philanthropy
- Spouse: James Armand de Rothschild (m. 1913; died 1957)

Dorothy de Rothschild (née Pinto; 7 March 1895 – 10 December 1988) was an English philanthropist and activist for Jewish affairs who married into the wealthy Rothschild banking family.

Mathilde Dorothy Pinto was born on 7 March 1895 in London, the daughter of Eugene Pinto (1854–1932) and Catherine Pinto née Cohen (1872–1939). Known to her friends as "Dolly", she married her cousin James Armand de Rothschild (known as Jimmy) at the age of 17 in 1913. He was 35 years old, the son of Edmond James de Rothschild of the Paris branch of the Rothschild family. In 1922 James de Rothschild inherited Waddesdon Manor in Buckinghamshire. This became their country home. They also had a London house in St James's Square.

Dorothy de Rothschild assisted her husband in his political campaigns, particularly from 1929 to 1945 when he was Liberal Member of Parliament for the Isle of Ely constituency.

After his death in 1957, Waddesdon Manor was bequeathed to the National Trust, but the surrounding estate and smaller mansion at Eythrope in Buckinghamshire were retained by Mrs. de Rothschild and bequeathed to her husband's great nephew Jacob Rothschild, 4th Baron Rothschild. She remained a strong influence on the preservation and development of the house and collections at Waddesdon.

Dorothy de Rothschild continued the Zionist interests of her father-in-law and husband, and was a close friend of Chaim Weizmann. She became chairman of Yad Hanadiv, the Rothschild family charities in Israel, and saw through her husband's gift of funds to build the Knesset and her own gift of the Supreme Court of Israel building.

At her death in 1988, she left £94,117,964 (equivalent to £262 million in 2025), the largest probated estate to that date in England and Wales.

She is buried at Willesden Jewish Cemetery.

== Sources ==
- Obituary, The Daily Telegraph, 12 December 1988
- Mrs James de Rothschild – Rothschilds at Waddesdon Manor (Collins, 1979); ISBN 0-00-216671-2
