= Windmill Hill, Buckinghamshire =

Archive in Buckinghamshire, England

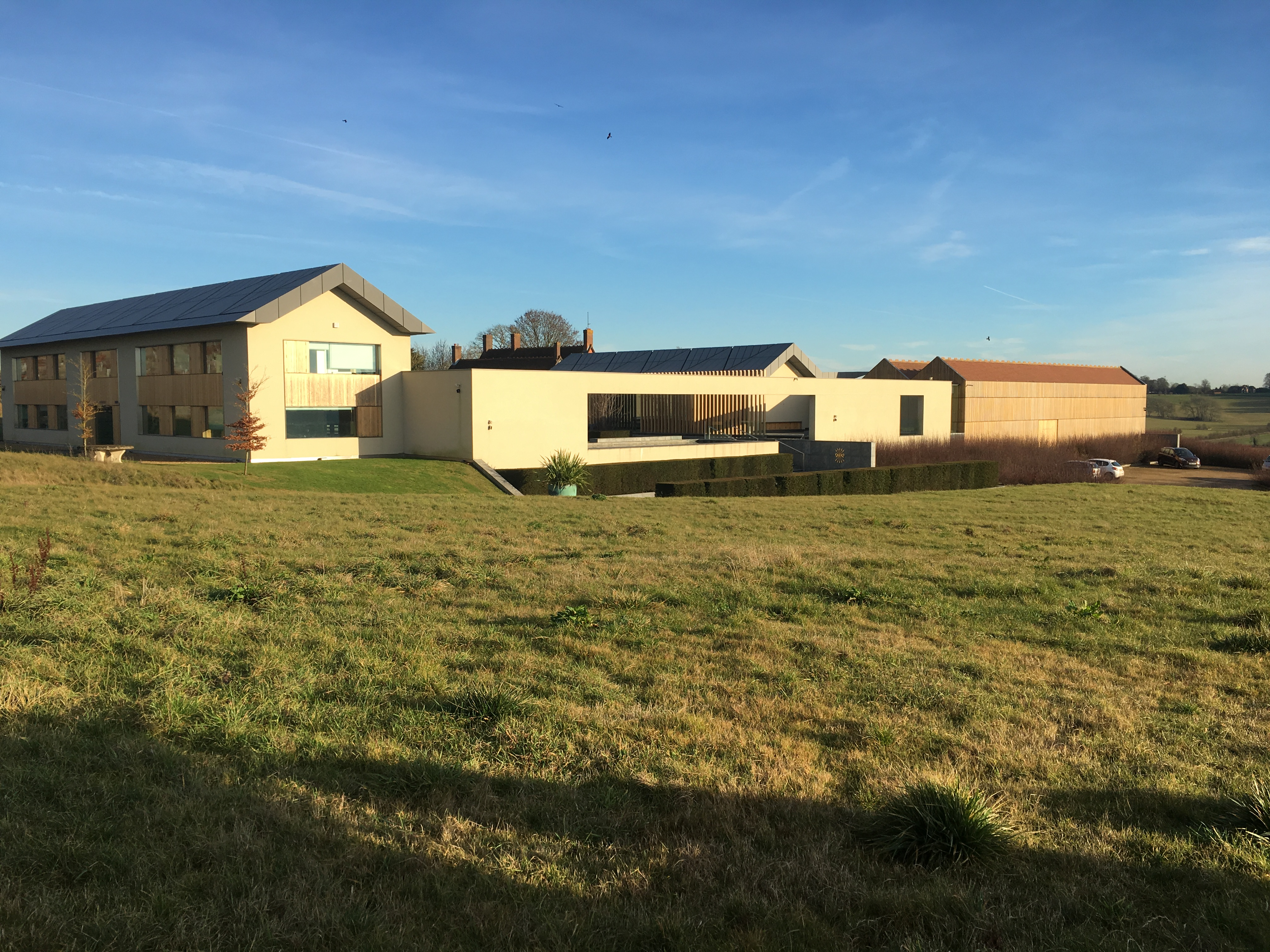
Windmill Hill

Windmill Hill is a purpose-built archive and office complex near Waddesdon Manor. It houses family archives from Waddesdon Manor, a contemporary art collection, a reading room, and performance spaces. It was built in 2011 by Stephen Marshall Architects of London. Originally a dairy farm, the building is now representative of the conservation and environmental work of the Rothschild Foundation.

The archives comprise a variety of documents including manuscripts, maps, plans, photographs, drawings and accounts.

== Architecture ==
"The building, wide, low and open, felt like a slice of California in the middle of Buckinghamshire. This sensation was explained to me by the Telegraph's architecture critic Ellis Woodman, who said that Marshall is influenced by the LA Case Study houses, which favour long rectangles and plentiful use of glass, built round swimming pools" says Serena Davies.

Original elements of the dairy farm have been retained, including two red-brick barns. Many vernacular features of the farm buildings have also been reinterpreted such as the metallic roofs and oak shutters. The complex was built using environmentally sustainable design principles. It has grey water recycling and ground source heating. The shutters allow natural ventilation and the deep eaves protect offices from the sun. It is also one of Britain's largest naturally-cooled archives as the stores have thick walls which create a stable environment without the use of air-conditioning.

== Art ==
There is a growing contemporary art collection which includes sculpture by Sarah Lucas, Angus Fairhurst, and Richard Long in the grounds around the building. In addition there are paintings, sculptures and ceramics in the building, including works by Edmund du Waal.

== Archive ==
The building houses the Waddesdon Archive. This includes documents relating to the creation of Waddesdon Manor as well as documents relating to the Butrint Foundation and P & D Colnaghi Ltd art dealers.

== Public access ==
There is limited public access to Windmill Hill on tours organised by Waddesdon Manor.
