= Hammes =

Hammes is a surname. Notable people with the surname include:

- Charles-Léon Hammes (1898–1967), Luxembourgian lawyer and judge
- Ernie Hammes (born 1968), Luxembourgian jazz trumpeter
- Ewald Hammes (born 1950), German footballer
- George Albert Hammes (1911–1993), American Catholic bishop
- Gordon Hammes (born 1934), American chemist
- Jon Hammes, American businessman
- Karl Hammes (1896–1939), German operatic baritone
- Kathrin Hammes (born 1989), German road bicycle racer
- Liselotte Hammes (born 1933), German operatic soprano
- Luciane Hammes (born 1988), Brazilian rhythmic gymnast
- Thomas Hammes (born 1953), American counter-insurgency theorist

== See also ==
- Hommes
