= Waddesdon Manor =

Country house in Buckinghamshire, England

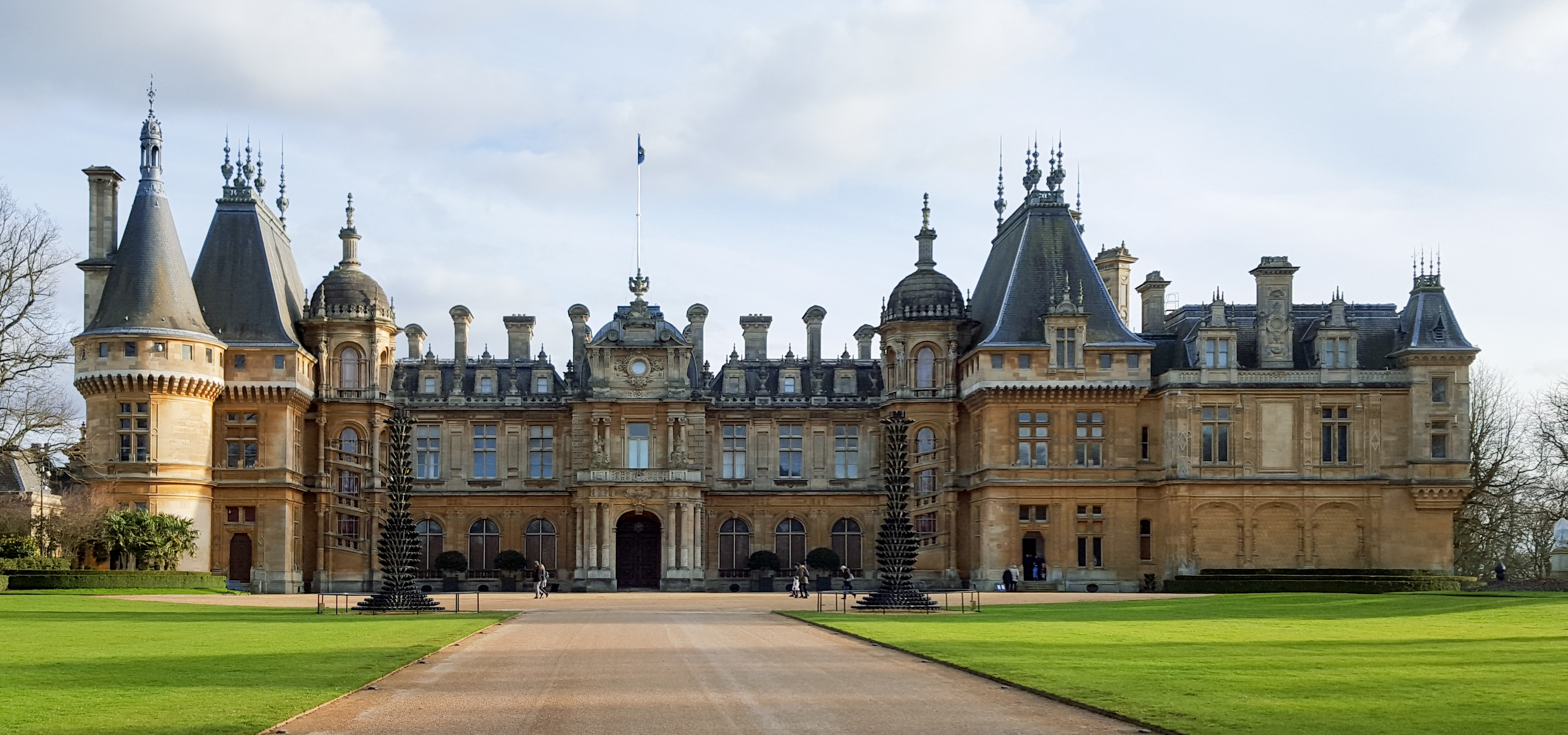
- The north-facing entrance facade in 2016

General information
- Architectural style: Neo-Renaissance
- Classification: Museum
- Location: Waddesdon, Aylesbury, Buckinghamshire, HP18 0JH, United Kingdom
- Coordinates: 51°50′32″N 0°56′16″W OS grid SP 73310 16445
- Groundbreaking: 1874 (est.)
- Construction started: 18 August 1877
- Completed: 1883
- Renovated: 1990–1997
- Client: Baron Ferdinand de Rothschild
- Landlord: National Trust

Design and construction
- Architect: Hippolyte Destailleur

Website
- waddesdon.org.uk

Listed Building – Grade I
- Official name: Waddesdon Manor
- Designated: 21 December 1967
- Reference no.: 1117804

Waddesdon Manor is a country house in the village of Waddesdon, in Buckinghamshire, England. Owned by the National Trust and managed by the Rothschild Foundation, it is one of the National Trust's most visited properties, with over 463,000 visitors in 2019.

The Grade I listed house was built in a mostly Neo-Renaissance style, copying individual features of several French châteaux, between 1874 and 1889 for Baron Ferdinand de Rothschild (1839–1898) as a weekend residence for entertaining and to house his collection of arts and antiquities. As the manor and estate have passed through three generations of the Rothschild family, the contents of the house have expanded to become one of the most rare and valuable collections in the world. In 1957, James de Rothschild bequeathed the house and its contents to the National Trust, opening the house and gardens for the benefit of the general public. Unusually for a National Trust property, the family of James Rothschild, the donor, manage the house. The Rothschild Foundation, chaired by Dame Hannah Rothschild, continues to invest in the property.

== History ==
=== 1874–1898 ===
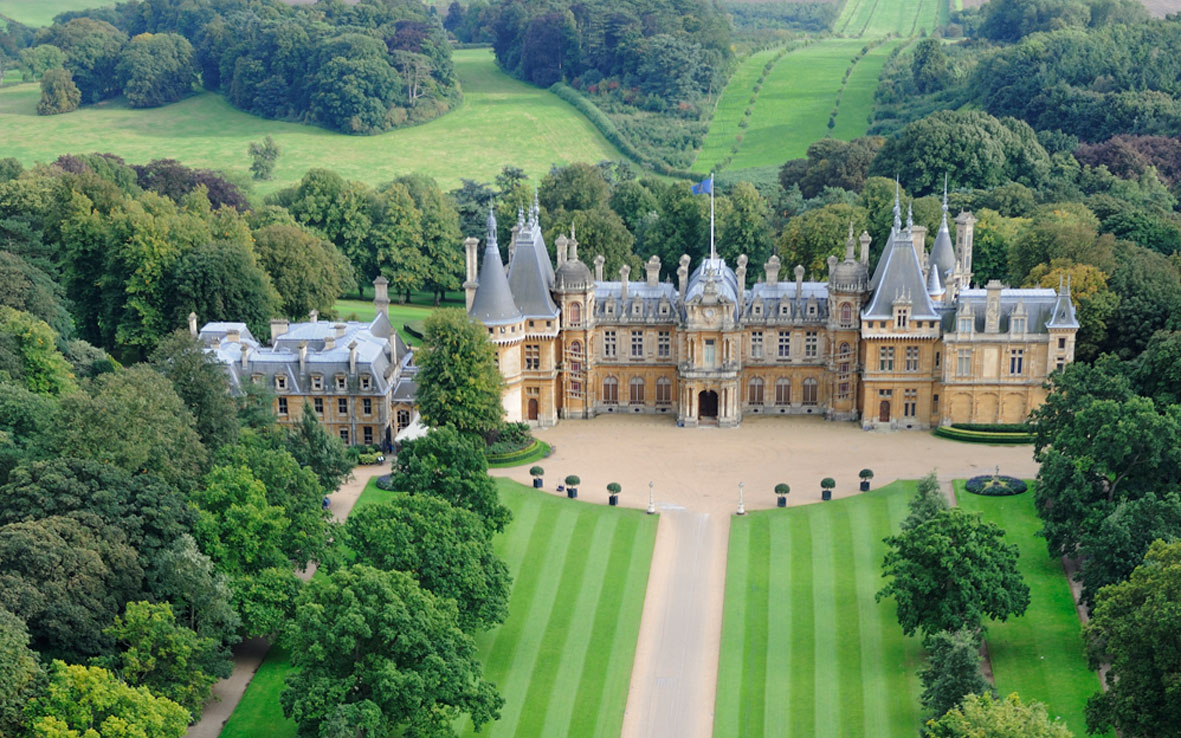
Aerial view of Waddesdon from the north

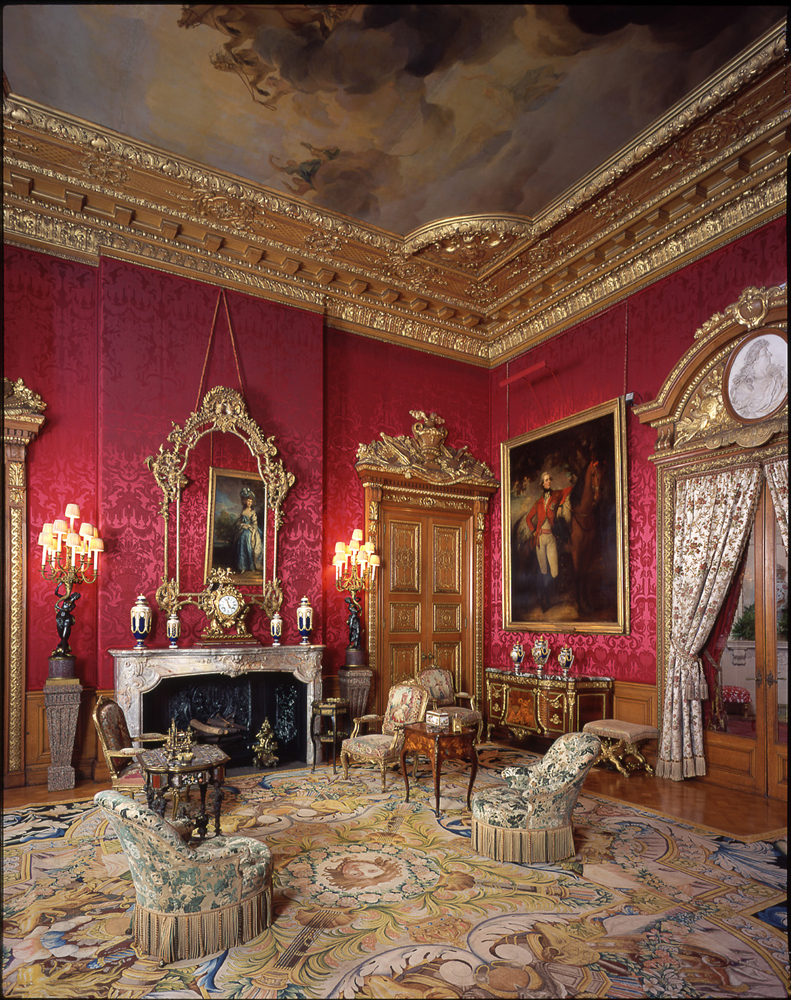
The Red Drawing Room

There had been a medieval manor house, probably moated, on the estate, now vanished. In 1874, Baron Ferdinand de Rothschild bought the Waddesdon agricultural estate from John Spencer-Churchill, 7th Duke of Marlborough with money inherited from his father Anselm. Rothschild was familiar with the estate from fox hunting in the locality. At the time of purchase, the estate had no house, park or garden. The site of the future manor house was a bare hill known as Lodge Hill, which had been stripped of its timber by the impoverished Duke of Marlborough prior to the sale. Over the following three years, the summit of the hill was levelled; eventually, on 18 August 1877, the foundation stone was laid.

The first house party was held in May 1880 with seven of Rothschild's close male friends enjoying a fireworks display. When, finally, the main house was ready in 1883, Rothschild invited 20 guests to stay. Before his premature death in 1898, on weekends between May and September, Baron de Rothschild was host to many important guests, including Albert Edward, Prince of Wales (the future King Edward VII). House parties usually involved 14 to 20 guests.

Guests commented on the level of luxury service provided by the 24 house staff. In 1890, Queen Victoria unusually requested to pay a visit. She was impressed with the beauty of the house and grounds as well as Rothschild's ability to quietly manage the day's events. She was struck by the newly installed electric lights designed to look like candles in the chandeliers, and it is reported that she asked for the room to be darkened to fully witness the effect.

=== 1898–1957 ===
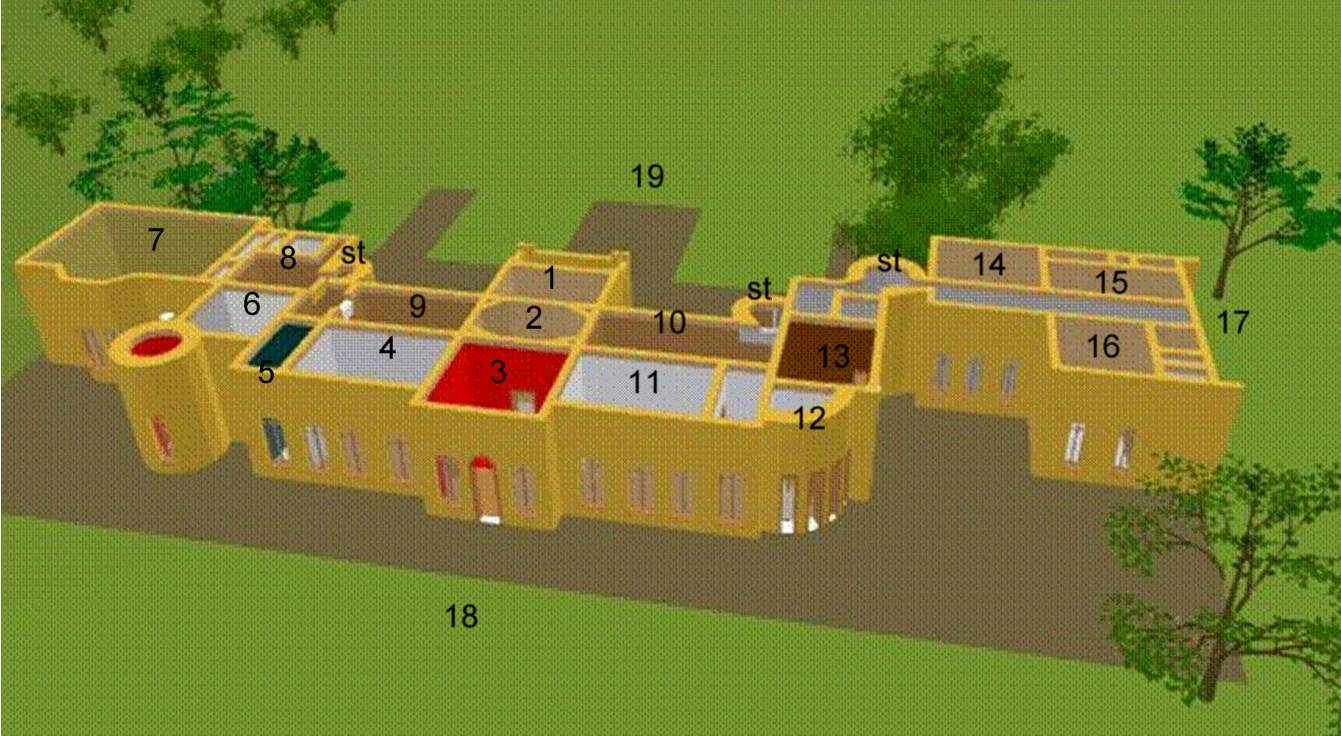
Plan of Waddesdon's ground floor. 1:Vestibule; 2:Entrance Hall, 3 Red Drawing room; 4:Grey Drawing Room; 5:Library; 6:Baron's Sitting room; 7:Morning Room; 8:West Hall; 9:West Gallery; 10:East Gallery; 11:Dining Room; 12:Conservatory; 13:Breakfast Room; 14:Kitchen; 15:Servant's Hall; 16:Housekeeper's Rooms; 17:Site of further servants quarters (not illustrated); 18:Terrace and parterre; 19 North Drive; St:staircases.

When Baron Ferdinand died in 1898, the house passed to his sister Alice de Rothschild. She saw Waddesdon as a memorial for her brother and was committed to preserving it. She did add significant items to the collection, particularly furniture and carpets with French royal provenances, Meissen porcelain, textiles and armour.

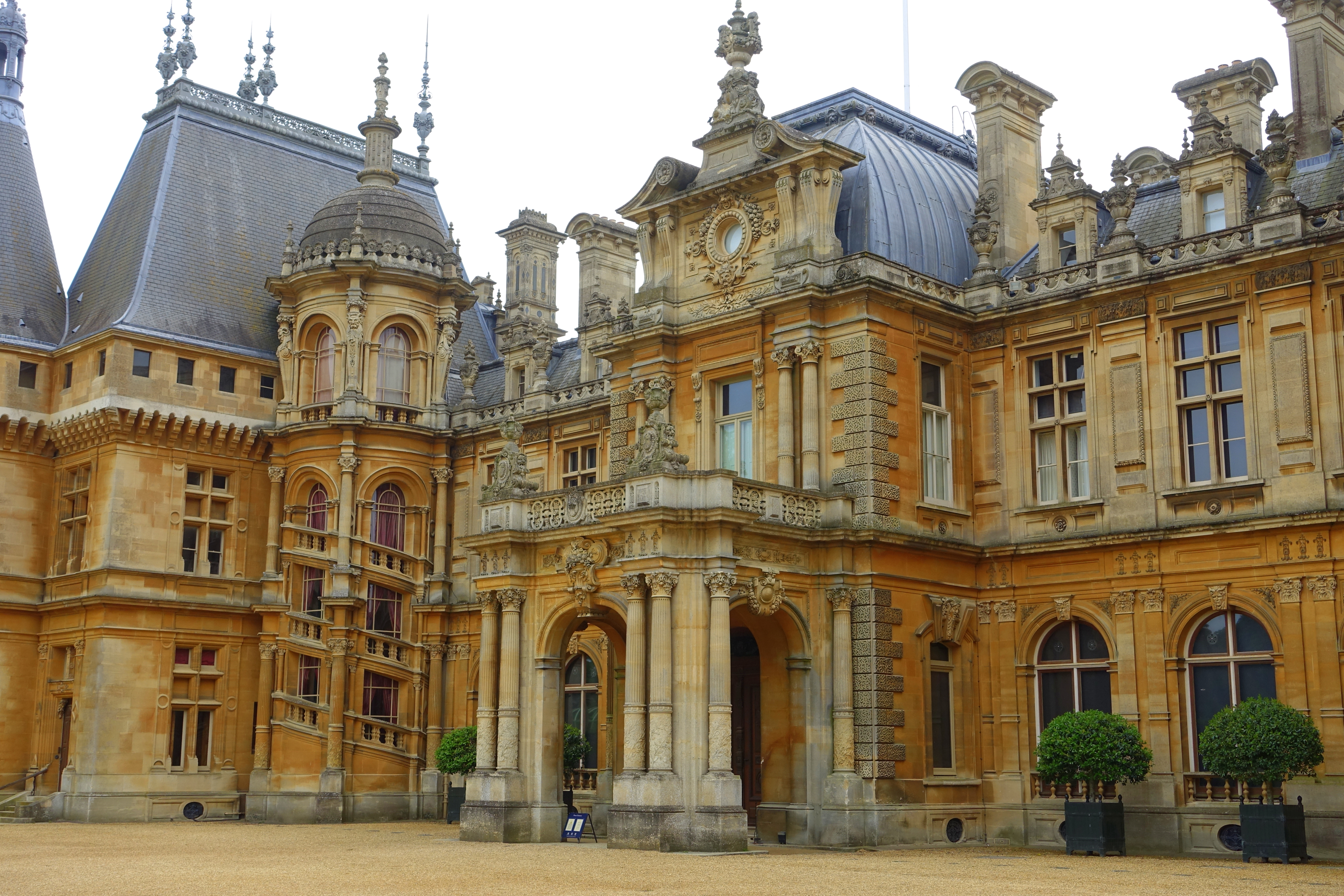
Front entrance

Following Alice de Rothschild's death in 1922, the property and collections passed to her French great-nephew James de Rothschild, who was married to an English woman, Dorothy Pinto. James further enriched the manor with objects from the collections of his late father Baron Edmond James de Rothschild of Paris.

James and Dorothy hosted a Liberal Party rally at Waddesdon in 1928, where David Lloyd George addressed the crowd. During World War II, children under the age of five were evacuated from Croydon and lived at Waddesdon Manor, the only time children lived in the house. James and Dorothy also provided asylum at Waddesdon for a group of Jewish boys from Frankfurt.

=== 1957–1997 ===
When James de Rothschild died in 1957, he bequeathed Waddesdon Manor, 120 acres (49 ha) of grounds and its contents to the National Trust, to be preserved for posterity. Dorothy moved to nearby Eythrope and the manor was never again used as a residence. It opened to the public in 1959, with around 27,000 visitors in the first year. Dorothy chaired the new management committee in close collaboration with the National Trust and took a very keen interest in Waddesdon for the remainder of her long life.

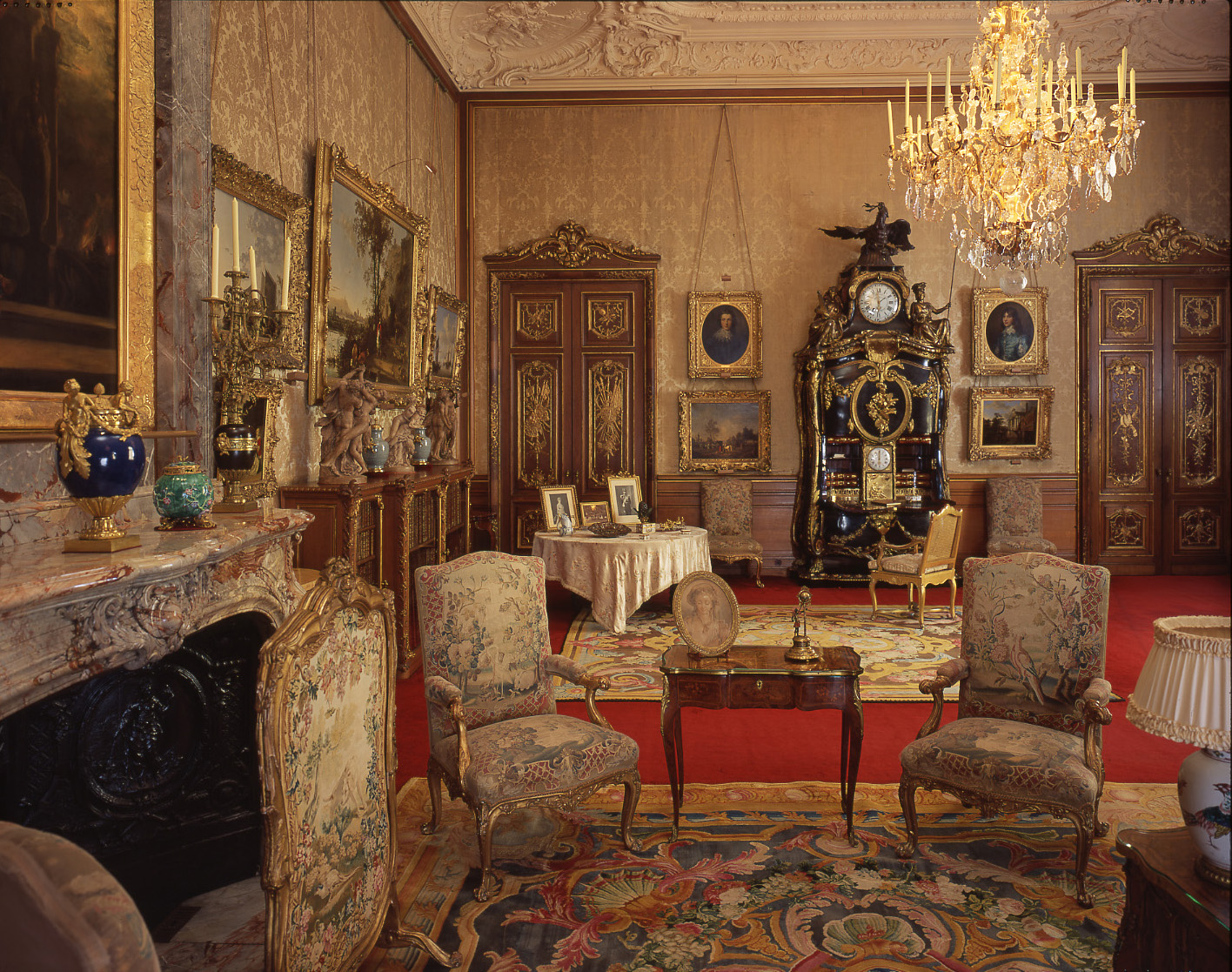
Dutch and English paintings in the Morning Room

At Dorothy's death, in 1989, her nephew Jacob Rothschild inherited her position and responsibilities. In March 1990, Jacob succeeded his father to become the fourth Baron Rothschild. At Lord Rothschild's initiative, the manor underwent a major restoration from 1990 to 1997, and the visitor attractions were enhanced, including the creation of the Waddesdon Wine Cellars.

=== 1997–2019 ===
Until his death in February 2024, Lord Rothschild chaired the family charity handling Waddesdon's management, the Rothschild Foundation. Waddesdon Manor operates as an independent organisation within the National Trust.

From 2004 to 2006, the Baron's Room and Green Boudoir were restored to reflect Baron Ferdinand's original arrangements. In 2003 a burglary was committed involving the Johnson Gang, when approximately 100 gold snuff boxes and other items were stolen from the collection prompting the installation of new security measures. In 2021 one small sweet-box from this theft was identified at auction and returned to Waddesdon.

Since 2004, there has been an exhibitions programme. Notable exhibitions include the Lod Mosaic in 2014. Waddesdon was one venue celebrating the work of Henry Moore in 2015 and Eliot Hodgkin in 2019.

New works of art have been acquired by the Rothschild Foundation to complement the existing collections at Waddesdon, such as Le Faiseur de Châteaux de Cartes by Jean-Baptiste-Siméon Chardin, added in 2007.

There has also been a programme of engagement with contemporary artists, beginning with Angus Fairhurst represented by Arnolfini in 2009. Works have been sited near the Manor and on the wider estate including by Richard Long, Sarah Lucas. In 2012, Christie's chose the manor to exhibit sculptures by leading contemporary artists.

Between 2013 and 2017, Bruce Munro had a residency at Waddesdon Manor, beginning with the music and light piece Cantus Arcticus in the Coach House Gallery in 2013. Winter Light (2013), with its distinctive wigwam-type structures sited in the gardens of the manor, was Munro's first solo exhibition of his large-scale pieces; Winter Light returned in 2016–2017. In 2014, Munro developed his pod-like structures, adding elements of language in Snow Code, shown in the manor. In ...---...SOS, Munro's winter exhibition of 2015–2016, tents were lit up in tune with sound, in response to images of disaster relief.

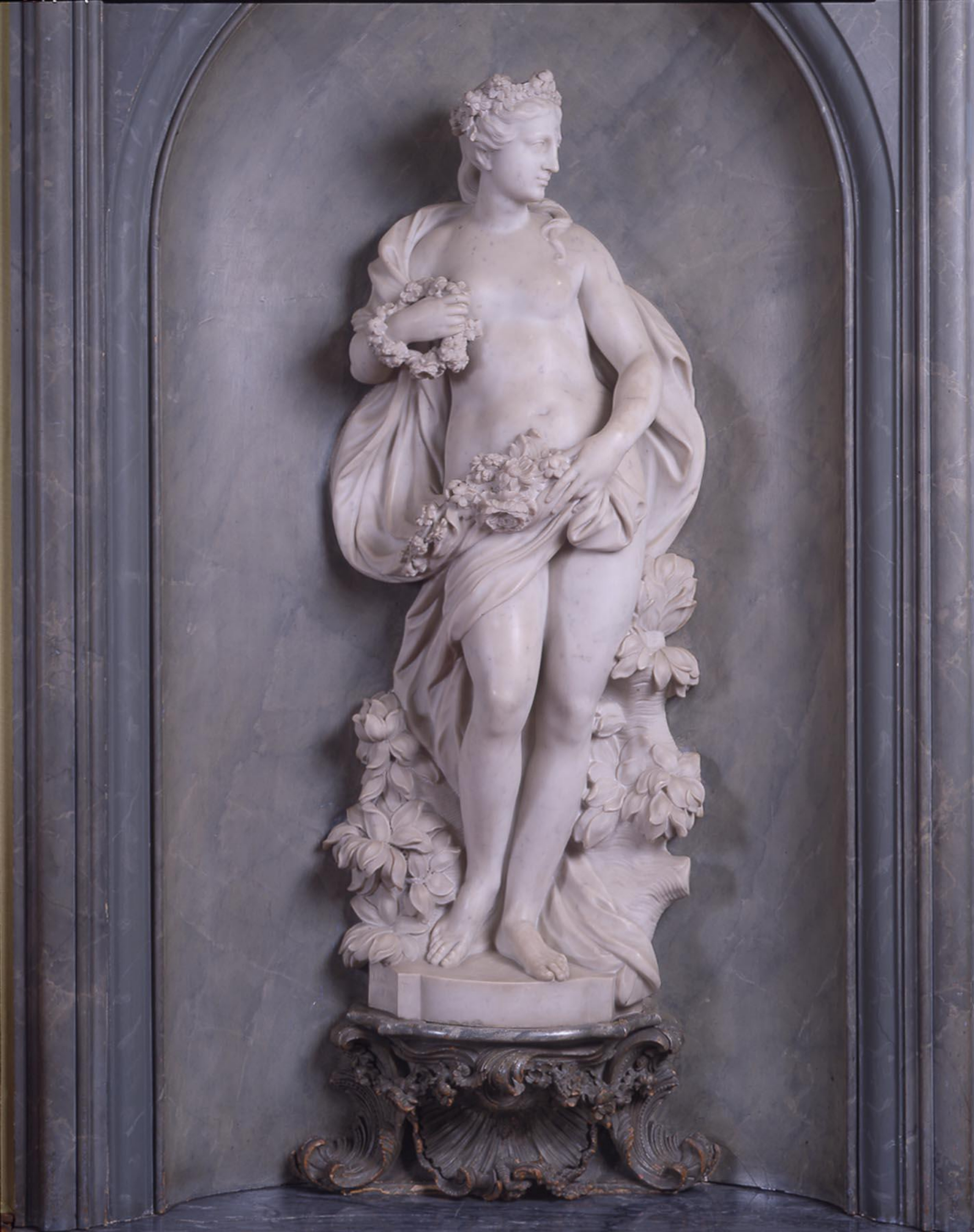
Flora by Jan Baptist Xavery, bedroom corridor

In 2012, Edmund de Waal exhibited work in the manor, creating a dialogue between his work and the historical interiors. In 2015, artist Joana Vasconcelos was commissioned to install two sculptures entitled Lafite in front of the Manor. In 2016, Kate Malone exhibited a collection of new work inspired by the people, gardens, collections, and archive. Two portrait pots of Baron Ferdinand and Alice de Rothschild by Malone remain on display at the Manor.

== Architecture ==
Prior to the construction of Waddesdon Manor, no house existed on the site. Ferdinand de Rothschild wanted a house in the style of the great Renaissance châteaux of the Loire Valley. Ferdinand chose as his architect Gabriel-Hippolyte Destailleur. Destailleur was already experienced in working in this style, having overseen the restoration of many châteaux in that region, in particular that of the Château de Mouchy.

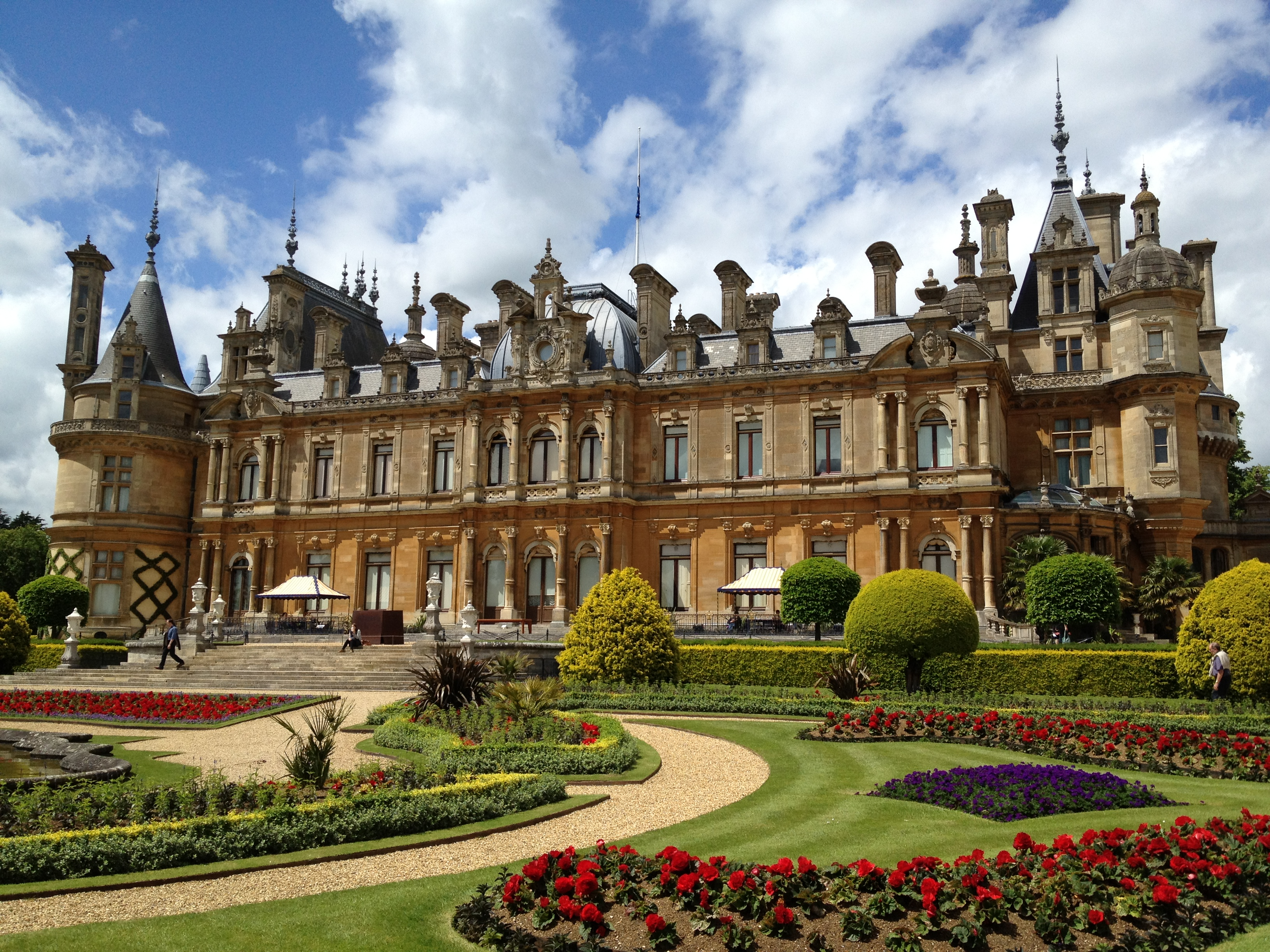
The terrace and parterre garden at Waddesdon Manor, overlooked by the building's south facade

Through Destailleur's vision, Waddesdon embodied an eclectic style based on the châteaux so admired by his patron, Baron Ferdinand. The towers at Waddesdon were based on those of the Château de Maintenon, and the twin staircase towers, on the north façade, were inspired by the staircase tower at the Château de Chambord. However, following the theme of unparalleled luxury at Waddesdon, the windows of the towers at Waddesdon were glazed, unlike those of the staircase at Chambord. They are also far more ornate.

The structural design of Waddesdon was not entirely retrospective. Hidden from view were the most modern innovations of the late 19th century including a steel frame, which took the strain of walls on the upper floors, and which consequently permitted the layout of these floors to differ completely from the lower floors. The house also had hot and cold running water in its bathrooms, central heating, and an electric bell system to summon the numerous servants. The building contractor was Edward Conder & Son.

After the manor was completed in 1883, Ferdinand quickly decided it was too small, as his architect had prophesied. The Bachelors' Wing to the east was extended after 1885 and the Morning Room, built in late-Gothic style, was added to the west after 1888. The stables to the west of the manor were built in 1884. Ferdinand and his stud groom devised the plan, working with Conder. Destailleur designed the facades in a French 17th-century style.

=== Wine cellars ===
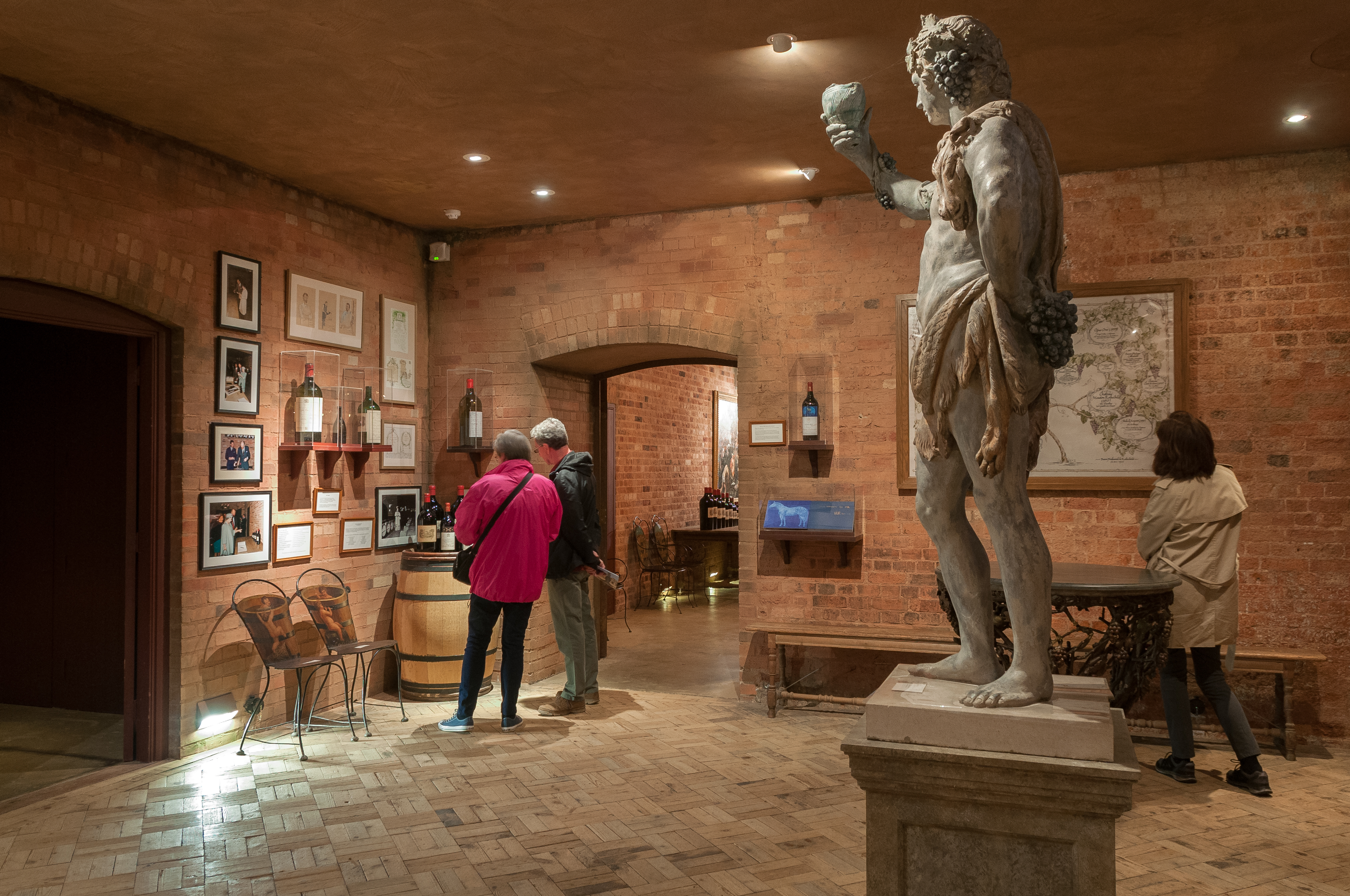
The wine cellars

The wine cellars in the manor were created during the centenary restoration and opened in 1994. They are modelled on the private cellars at Château Lafite Rothschild. More than 15,000 bottles are stored in the Cellars, some 150 years old, the majority from the Château Lafite Rothschild and Château Mouton Rothschild estates. It is the largest private collection of Rothschild wines in the world. There are also wine labels designed by artists such as Salvador Dalí and Andy Warhol.

== Collections ==
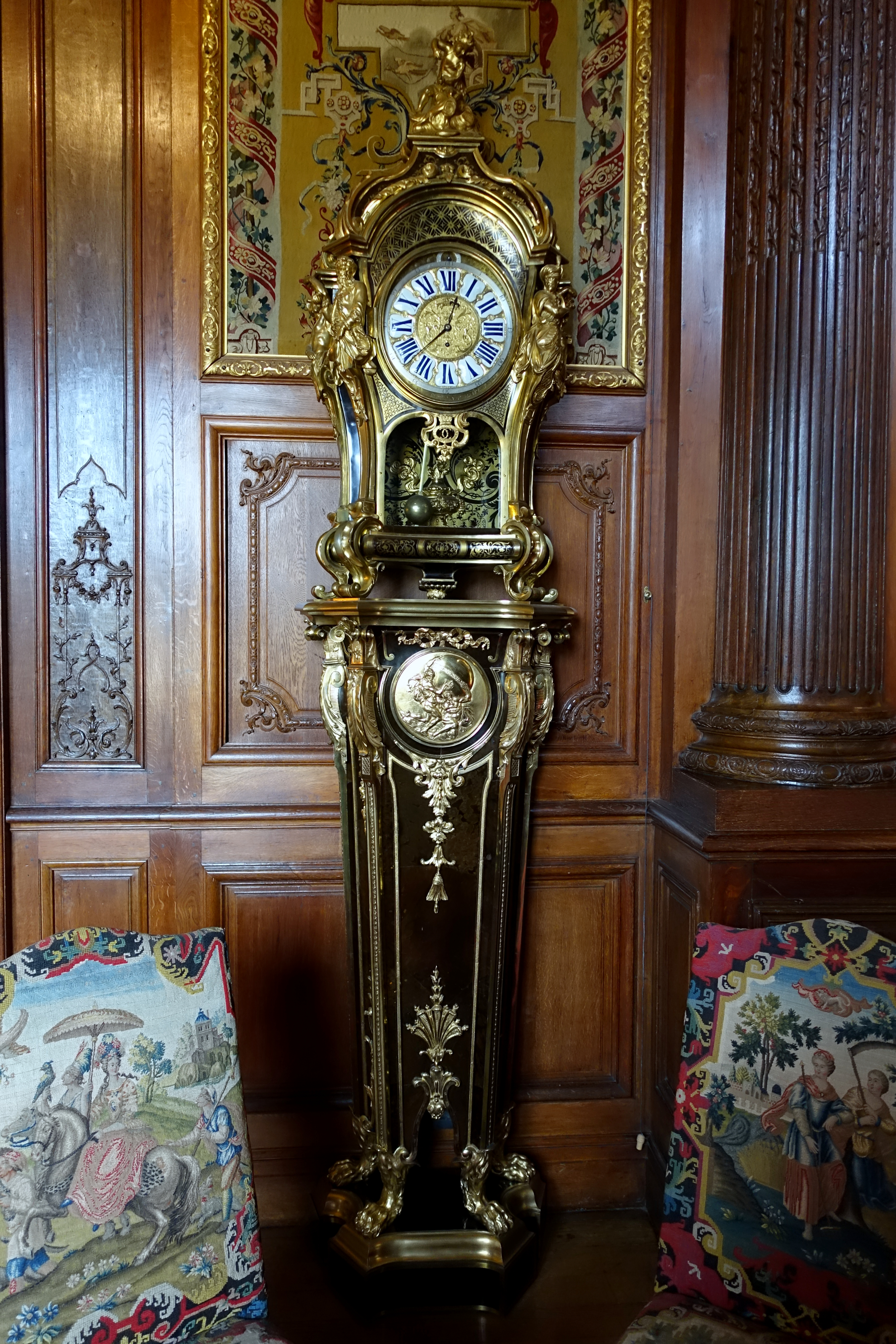
Pedestal clock attributed to André-Charles Boulle, movement by George Graham, 1720–1725

Once his château was complete, Baron Ferdinand installed his extensive collections of English 18th-century portraits by artists like Gainsborough and Reynolds, as well as French 18th-century boiseries, Savonnerie carpets, Gobelins and Beauvais tapestries, furniture, Sèvres ceramics, books, Dutch paintings and Renaissance treasures.

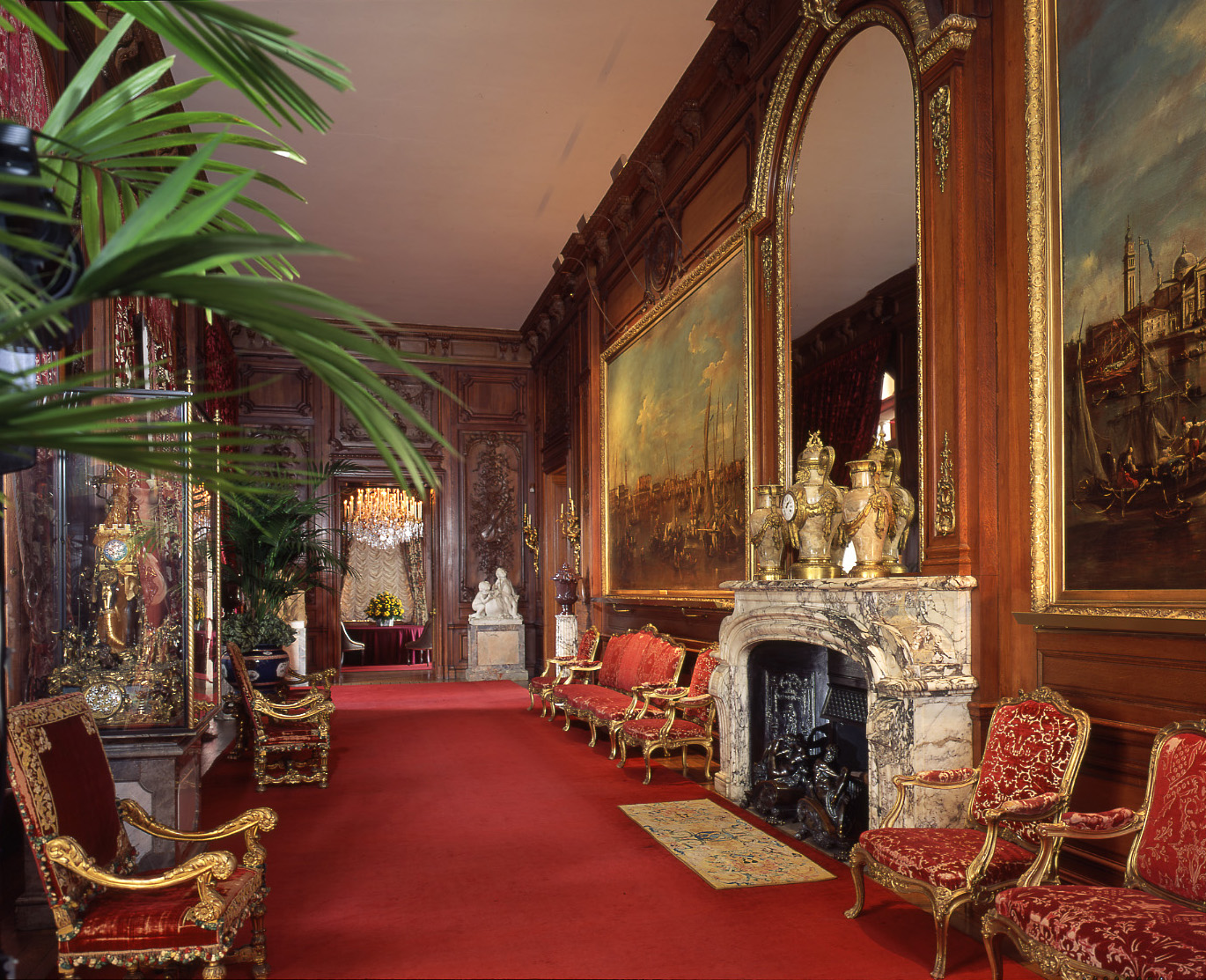
The Elephant Automaton in the East Gallery

Works were acquired for their exquisite quality and fine provenance, particularly those belonging to French royalty of the Ancien Régime. One of the highlights of the collection is the extraordinary musical automaton elephant, dating from 1774 and made by the French clockmaker H Martinet.

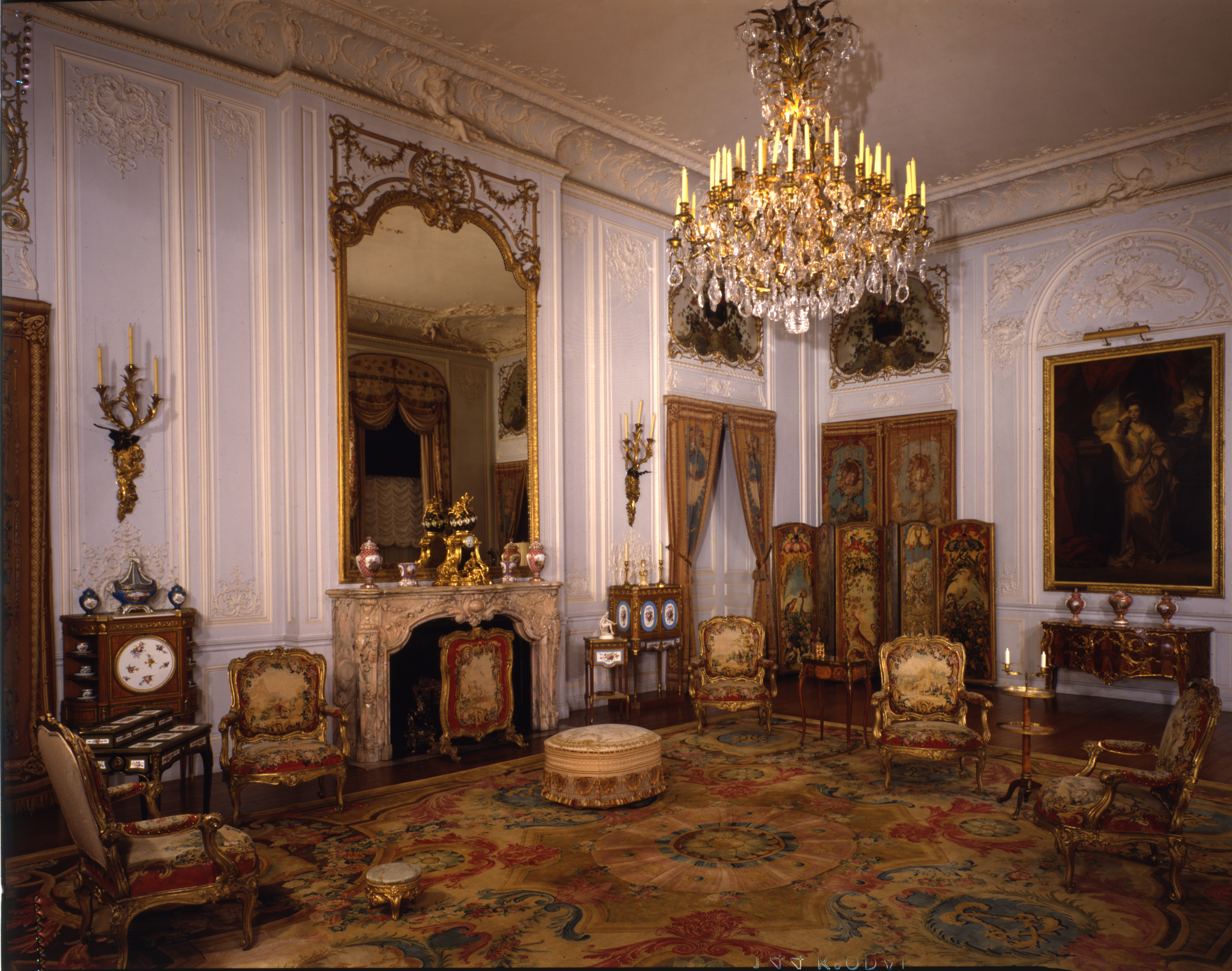
Grey Drawing Room with fine 18th-century French panelling and a Sèvres ship-vase in situ

Of the ten surviving examples of the Sèvres pot-pourri vase in the shape of a ship from the 1760s, three are at Waddesdon, including one with a very rare scene of a battle connected to the Seven Years' War.

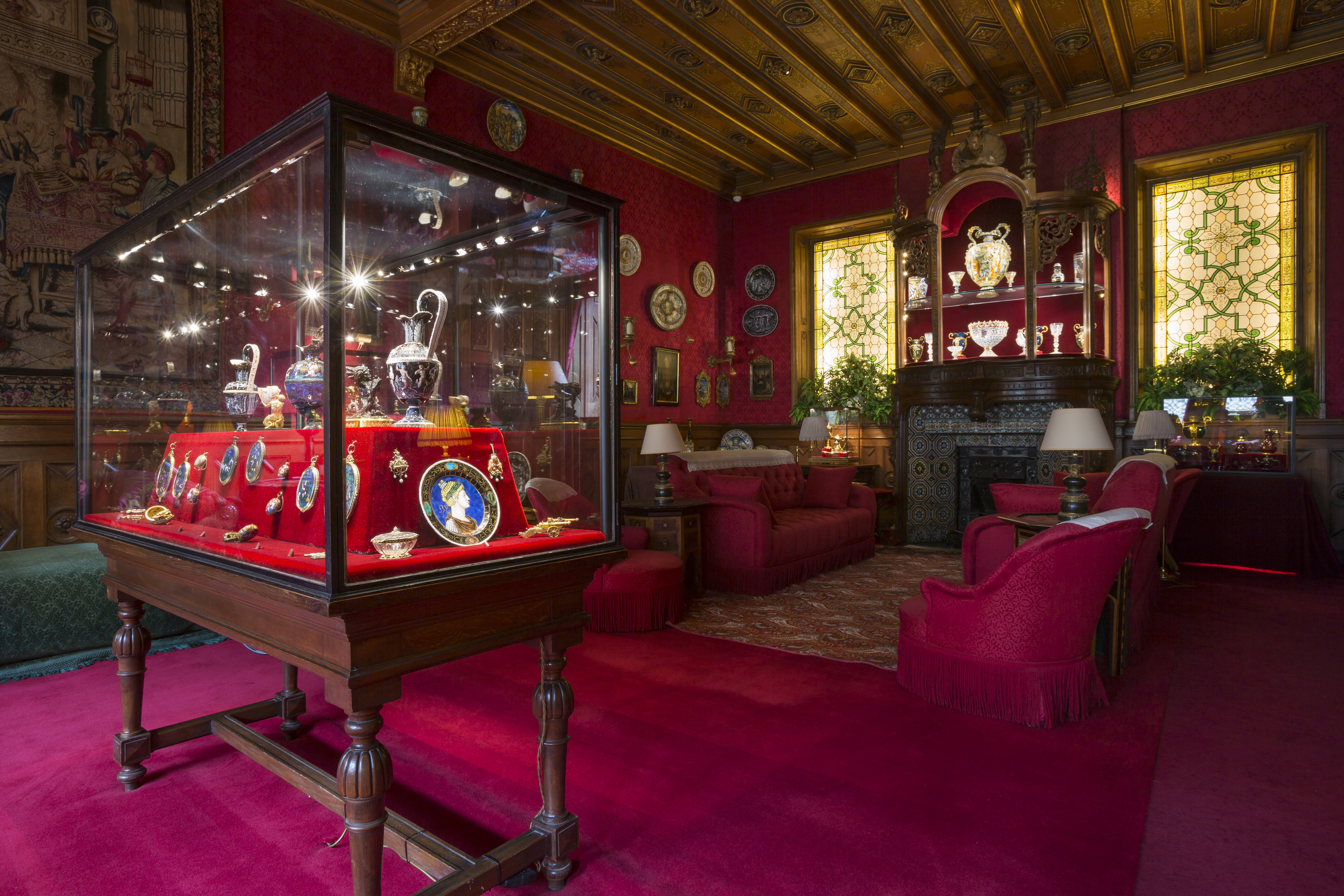
The restored Smoking Room with Renaissance treasures

In the 1890s, Baron Ferdinand focused on the Renaissance collection for his small museum in the New Smoking Room. This collection was bequeathed to the British Museum and is now known as the Waddesdon Bequest.

The interior of Waddesdon Manor was photographed in 1897 for Baron Ferdinand's privately published The Red Book.

Subsequent members of the family added noted collections of paintings, Limoges enamel, arms and armour, maiolica, manuscripts, prints and drawings.

Waddesdon's internationally famous collection has thus been formed principally by four members of the Rothschild family: Baron Ferdinand (1839–1898), his sister Alice de Rothschild (1847–1922), their cousin Edmond James de Rothschild (1845–1934) and Jacob Rothschild, 4th Baron Rothschild (1936–2024).

== Gardens ==
Baron Ferdinand wanted a garden to entertain his guests during his weekend house parties. To make the gardens, extensive landscaping of the hill was carried out, including leveling the top of the hill. The gardens and landscape park were laid out by the French landscape architect Elie Lainé. An attempt was made to transplant full-grown trees by chloroforming their roots, to limit the shock. While this novel idea was unsuccessful, many very large trees were successfully transplanted. Elaborate flower beds were planted, centred on the south Parterre. Several artificial rock formations were created by James Pulham, including to house mountain goats and llamas, part of Ferdinand's zoo. Altogether, the creation of his garden cost £153,000, which (in terms of average wages then and in 2015) equates to £68.8 million.

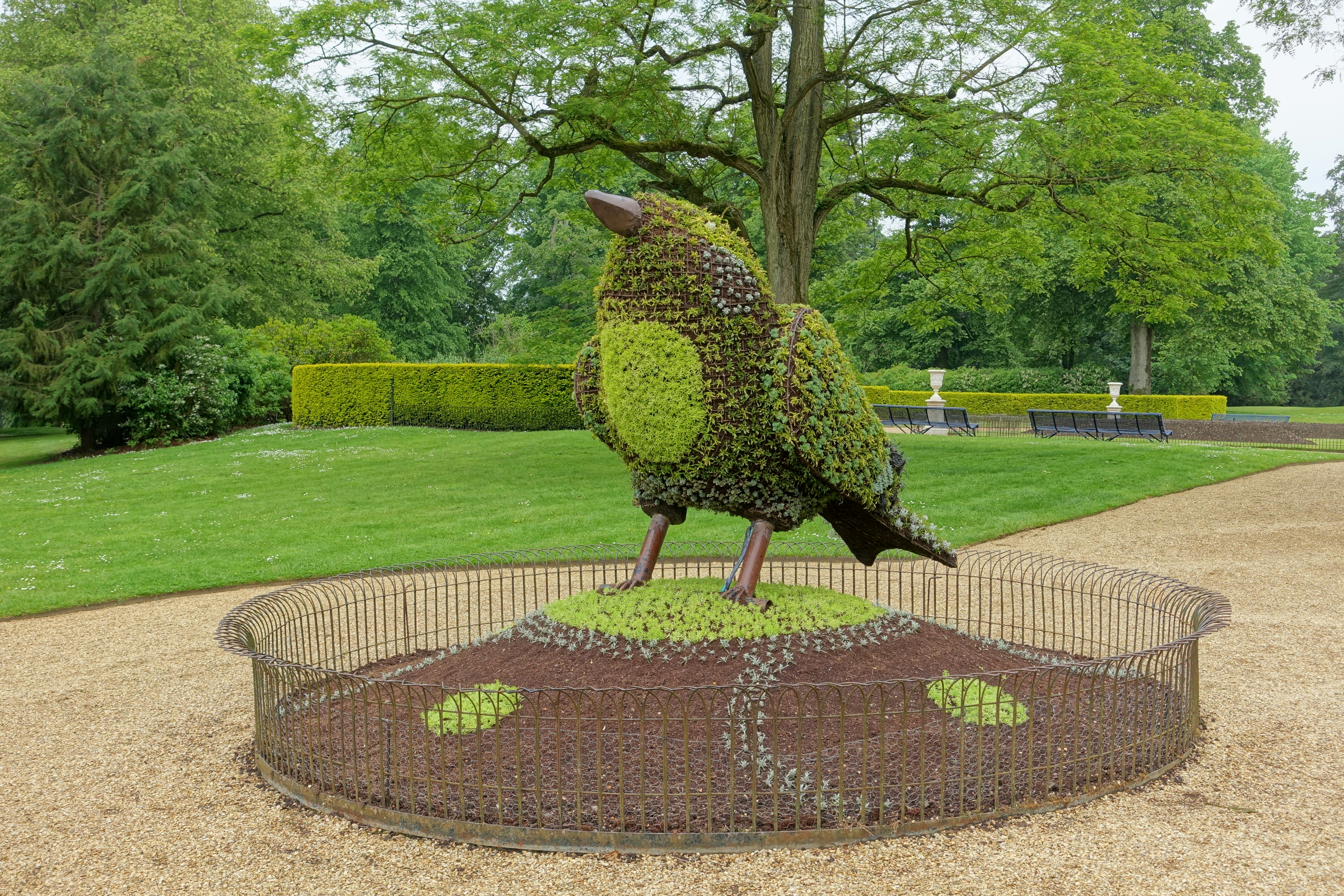
Three-dimensional bedding in the shape of a bird

After her brother's death Alice brought the care she had taken with her garden at Eythrope to Waddesdon. Alice was a keen gardener with a good understanding of flowers and plants; she would often walk around and weed the paths. With her head gardener, George Frederick Johnson who worked at Waddesdon from 1905 to 1954, Alice grew flowers for competition. Alice was responsible for introducing three-dimensional bedding in the shape of a bird, recreated in the gardens today.

Under James, the gardens were less impressive. The South Parterre was grassed over in the 1930s. It was replanted with flowers for the opening of the house under the National Trust in 1959.

As part of the 1990s restoration, Beth Rothschild led a team reintroducing Ferdinand's colour scheme of trees, shrubs and bedding plants. The carpet bedding is now designed on computer allowing the schemes to be quickly installed. The patterns change each year to reflect different themes.

The gardens are listed Grade I on the Register of Historic Parks and Gardens.

=== Garden trees ===
Though the trees are not of a great age there are many specimens of deciduous and coniferous trees that have now reached maturity creating the desired effect in the Waddesdon landscape. Some of these trees were planted in the 1870s and responsibility for this fell to William Barron whose job it was to transplant trees from the surrounding countryside to give the grounds of Waddesdon a sense of maturity, creating vistas and focal points under the instructions from Elie Lainé.

Deciduous trees were selected on their form, flowering and array of autumnal colour. Conifers were selected for their evergreen nature, cones and berries. Today many species such as chestnuts, limes and maples as well as yew, cedars and redwoods can be seen.

From Baron Ferdinand's time to today, distinguished visitors have been invited to plant memorial trees. Queen Victoria, King Edward VII, King George V and Queen Mary were early royal visitors. Charles III (as Prince of Wales) and Prime Ministers Sir John Major and Tony Blair have also planted trees.

=== Garden sculptures ===
Baron Ferdinand acquired many fine statues and fountains to add interest to the gardens. A notable feature is his love of 18th-century Italian pieces. The fountains to the north and south of the house include sculptures of Pluto, Proserpina, tritons and nereids originally made by Giuliano Mozani around 1720 for the Ducal Palace of Colorno. A bust of the muse Erato has been recently attributed to Filippo Parodi.

A fine example of French early 18th-century sculpture is sited near the Aviary: Apollo by Jean Raon, 1699, associated with a commission at Versailles. There are also Dutch vases in the style of Albert Jansz Vinckenbrinck and sculptures by Jan van Logteren, the latter were originally displayed at Aston Clinton House.

In 2001, Stephen Cox's tomb-like sculpture Interior Space: Terra degli Etruschi was installed at the end of the Baron's Walk. Inscribed on a nearby marble slab are the names of the Rothschilds who built and have cared for Waddesdon.

=== Aviary ===
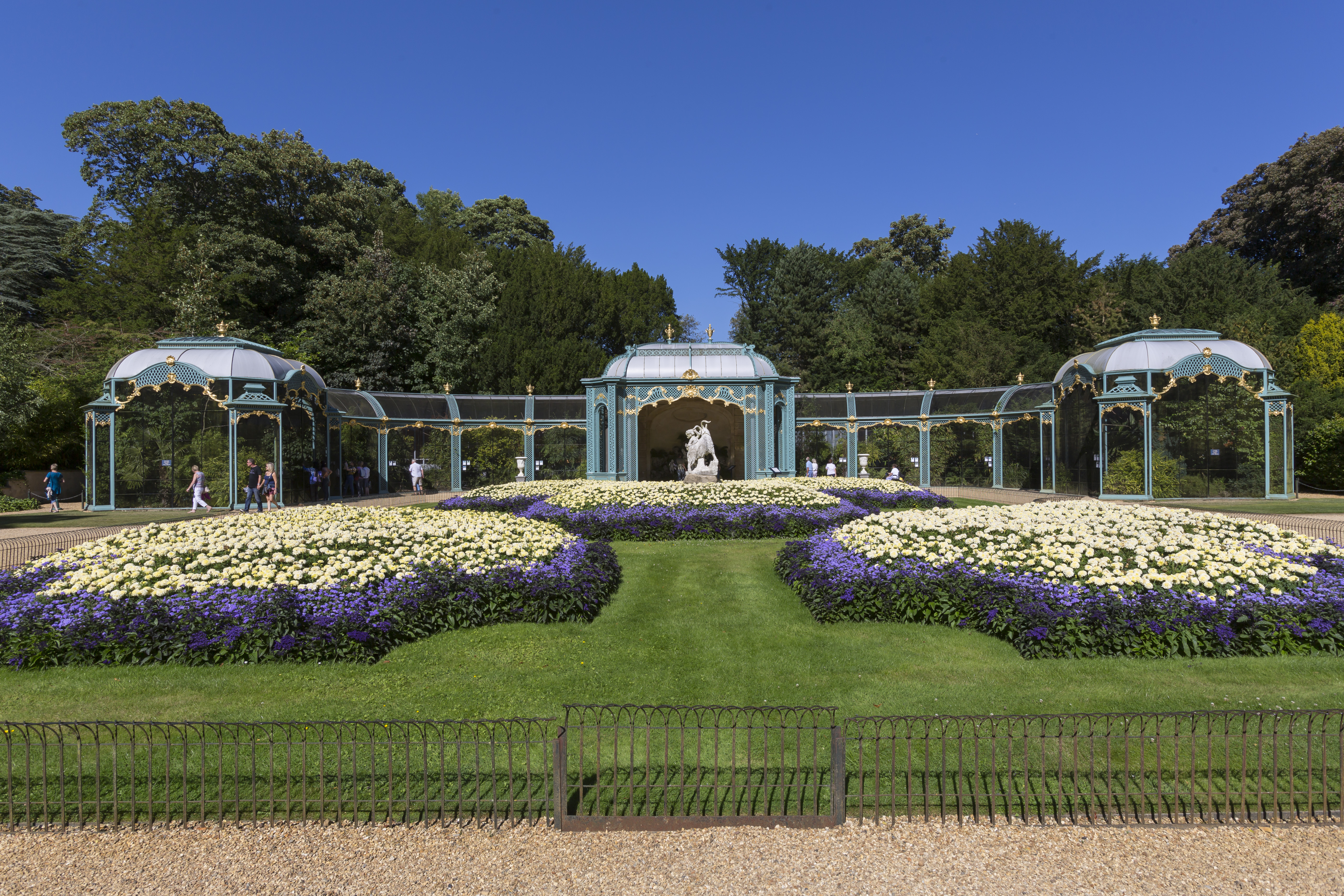
Waddesdon Manor aviary

Baron Ferdinand also created a cast-iron aviary, inspired by 18th-century pavilions at the Palace of Versailles and Château de Chantilly, as well as his childhood home at Grüneburg. It was completed in 1889. Like other members of his family, such as Walter Rothschild, 2nd Baron Rothschild, Ferdinand was also a keen animal lover. He stocked the aviary with exotic birds and enjoyed feeding them for his guests.

The aviary's paint and gilding were restored in 2003 and it now houses endangered species with a focus on breeding programs. It is a registered zoo.

== Estate ==
In Ferdinand's time, there was a large kitchen garden and extensive glass houses growing fruit and flowers, including Ferdinand's beloved orchids. They were near the Dairy Water garden which has elaborate rock formations by James Pulham. As part of the day's entertainments, Ferdinand's guests were taken to the ornamental Dairy to taste milk from cows who wore Meissen porcelain name tags.

In recent years, commissions to contemporary architects have occurred on the wider estate. Windmill Hill Archive (2011) was designed by Stephen Marshall. Flint House (2015) was designed by Charlotte Skene-Catling of Skene Catling de la Peña. It won RIBA House of the Year in 2015.

In 2012, it was announced that Waddesdon Manor would be one of the sites for Jubilee Woodlands, designated by the Woodland Trust to commemorate Queen Elizabeth II's Diamond Jubilee.

== Film and television ==
Many films have been shot at Waddesdon Manor, including the Carry On film Don't Lose Your Head (1966); Never Say Never Again (1983); An Ideal Husband (1999); Kabhi Khushi Kabhie Gham (2001), Ladies in Lavender (2004); Ripley Under Ground (2005); The Queen (2006); The Mummy: Tomb of the Dragon Emperor (2008); Sherlock Holmes: A Game of Shadows (2011); A Little Chaos (2014); Victor Frankenstein (2015), Our Kind of Traitor (2016); The Infiltrator (2016); Cinderella (2021); and Back In Action (2025).

Waddesdon Manor has also been used as a location for a number of television programmes. These include Howards' Way (1985), Downton Abbey (2011), And Then There Were None (BBC One, 2015), The Crown (2016), Endeavour and Queen Charlotte: A Bridgerton Story (2023).
