= Eythrope =

Hamlet in Buckinghamshire, England

Coordinates: 51.820°N 0.880°W

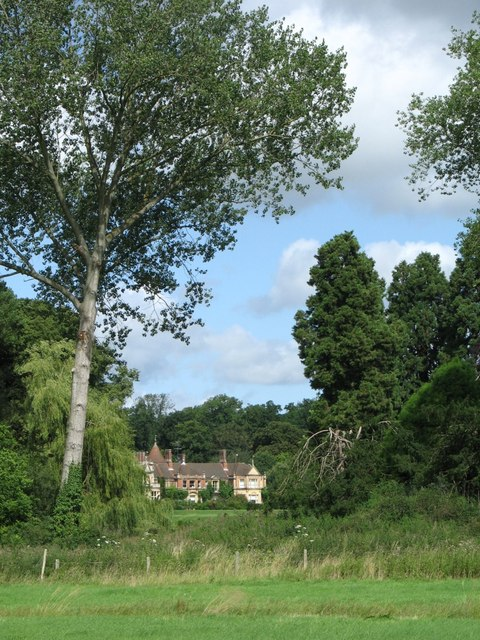
Eythrope Pavilion, from the North Bucks Way

Eythrope (previously Ethorp) is a hamlet and country house in the parish of Waddesdon, in Buckinghamshire, England. It is located to the south east of the main village of Waddesdon. It was bought in the 1870s by a branch of the Rothschild family, and belongs to them to this day.

Eythrope is Grade II listed on the National Heritage List for England, and its gardens are also grade II listed on the Register of Historic Parks and Gardens.

== History ==
The hamlet name is Anglo Saxon in origin, and means "island farm", referring to an island in the River Thame that flows by the hamlet. The medieval village of Eythrope is deserted and all that remains are some earthen banks and ditches on the eastern side of Eythrope Park. There was a manor house at this hamlet as early as 1309, when it was the home of the Arches family. One former owner, Sir Roger Dynham, built a chantry chapel on what is now the site of the pavilion. This was demolished by Sir William Stanhope in the 1730s.

The mansion was extended in 1610 by Dorothy Pelham, (One source says Sir William Dormer) this was her house from her first marriage. Her second husband William Pelham styled himself as "from Eythorpe", but this was more true of Dorothy who had her own financial independence.

William Stanhope (1702–1772) embellished Eythrope House around 1750. Stanhope employed Isaac Ware to build new stables (now lost) and follies in the garden and park. Two of these buildings survive: the grotto by the lake, and the bridge over the River Thame. The house was demolished in 1810-11 by Philip Stanhope, 5th Earl of Chesterfield.

In 1875, the manor at Eythrope was bought by Alice de Rothschild. She was the sister and companion of Baron Ferdinand de Rothschild who owned the neighboring estate Waddesdon Manor. The new house at Eythrope was not built on the site of the old manor. While building was in progress Alice fell ill with rheumatic fever and was advised to avoid damp conditions at night. As Eythrope was next to the river Thame, the plans were altered. The house was built without bedrooms as a place to house her collections and entertain guests during the day.

Alice chose one of the Rothschild family's favourite architects George Devey who had worked at nearby Ascott House, Aston Clinton House and in the villages belonging to the Mentmore Estate. Eythrope was something of a deviation from his usual approach. It is constructed in red brick with stone dressings. With its twisting chimneys, turrets and gables, it is a mixture of Devey's usual Jacobean style and the French Renaissance architecture of Waddesdon Manor. This is especially noticeable on the concave roof to the round tower, and the gable on the garden facade which are particularly reminiscent of Waddesdon. Because of its small size the house was christened "The Pavilion" or the "Water Pavilion".

As in other Rothschild homes, French panelling and furniture dressed the rooms. Alice also collected Renaissance sculpture, paintings and maiolica ware.

Around the house, Alice developed 30 acres of highly ornamental and innovative gardens that complemented the splendour of Waddesdon Manor. She also created a four-acre walled kitchen garden and added an Old English Tea House (now lost) to the historic parkland. A large, rectangular stable block (listed grade II), built in stone and half-timber, and three picturesque lodges, were probably designed by W Taylor & Son of Bierton. House parties from Waddesdon Manor would drive the four miles for tea, taking a steam launch up the river to the tea house.

In 1922 following Alice's death, The Pavilion was inherited by James Armand de Rothschild and his wife Dorothy. From 1922 to around 1939, they let it to Syrie Maugham, the estranged wife of Somerset Maugham. She added bedrooms and bathrooms to the Pavilion, but by 1957 the wing was structurally unsound. In the 1957, James de Rothschild bequeathed Waddesdon Manor, which he had inherited, to the National Trust. His widow, Dorothy, then moved to the smaller pavilion and made substantial alterations and enlargements in a solid late Victorian/Edwardian architectural style which complemented the original building.

== Present day ==
Dorothy de Rothschild died in 1988 leaving the estate and Pavilion to her husband's great nephew, Jacob Rothschild, 4th Baron Rothschild. The Pavilion, the private home of Lord Rothschild, is the only one of the Buckinghamshire Rothschilds seven houses to remain in Rothschild hands.

The gardens continue to be developed and maintained, growing vegetables, fruit and flowers for the estate. The walled garden was redesigned by Lady Mary Keen in 1990. Keen created several gardens at different levels within the four acre walled garden. These included a large vegetable garden, a herb garden, Mediterranean pot garden, rose garden and a long late flowering herbaceous border which runs as an artery through the gardens. A large Victorian glasshouse recreated on the foundations of an earlier glass house is used for the forcing of early cherries. Five further glasshouses are used for a variety of flowering plants and succulents and, in the summer, for growing several varieties of tomato.

== TV & film ==
Scenes from And Then There Were None by Agatha Christie, screened on BBC One from 26 to 28 December 2015, were filmed on the Estate roads and on the bridge at Eythrope.

== See also ==
- Rothschild properties in England
- Waddesdon Manor
