= Waddesdon =

Village in Buckinghamshire, England

Coordinates: 51.8460°N 0.9215°W

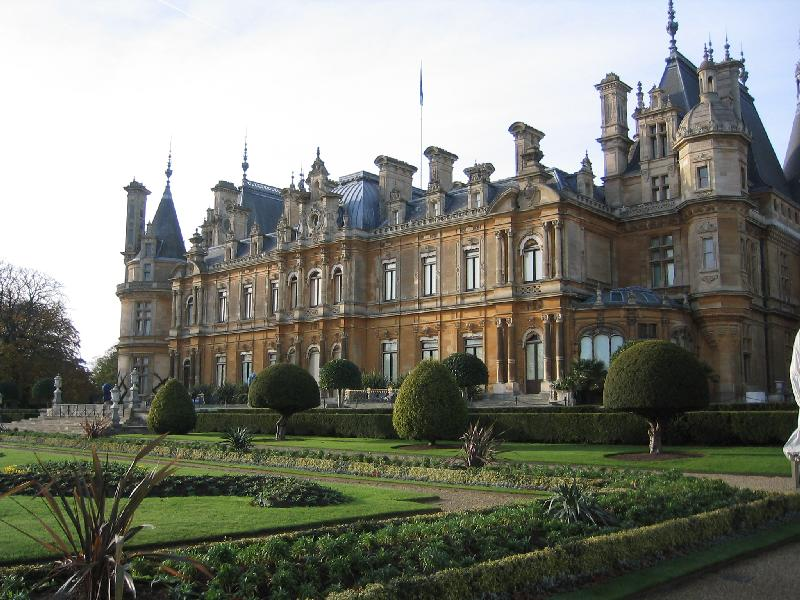
- Waddesdon Manor

- Location within Buckinghamshire
- Population: 2,097 (2011, including Fleet Marston and Upper Winchendon)
- OS grid reference: SP743168
- Civil parish: Waddesdon
- Unitary authority: Buckinghamshire
- Ceremonial county: Buckinghamshire
- Region: South East
- Country: England
- Sovereign state: United Kingdom
- Post town: AYLESBURY
- Postcode district: HP18
- Dialling code: 01296
- Police: Thames Valley
- Fire: Buckinghamshire
- Ambulance: South Central
- UK Parliament: Mid Buckinghamshire

Waddesdon /ˈwɒdzdən/ is a village in Buckinghamshire, England, 6 miles (10 km) west-north-west of Aylesbury on the A41 road. The village also includes the hamlets of Eythrope and Wormstone. Waddesdon was an agricultural settlement with milling, silk weaving and lace making enterprises.

== History ==
The name Waddesdon means "hill of a man named Wott".

The parish church of St Michael and All Angels dates from 1190 with medieval and Victorian additions.

Waddesdon was involved in the marriage of Maud Holland in the 1360s. Edward the Black Prince agreed with Hugh de Courtenay, 2nd/10th Earl of Devon that Maud would marry Devon's grandson Hugh Courtenay. Devon promised to award Maud an annuity of 200 marks and the manors of Sutton Courtenay and in Buckinghamshire. The arrangements were approved by Pope Urban V and Edward III. The wedding had taken place by February 1365, when the manors were granted to Maud.

Between 1897 and 1936, Waddesdon had train services on the Aylesbury and Buckingham Railway (later part of the Metropolitan) at Waddesdon railway station, two miles from the village. There was also a halt on the Brill Tramway.

In 1874, Baron Ferdinand de Rothschild bought a large estate in the area and built the mansion of Waddesdon Manor on a hill-top above the village. He transformed Waddesdon into an estate village, with new houses for employees and tenants, a school, a public house, cricket pavilion and village hall.

Waddesdon Manor and grounds are now the property of the National Trust, and Jacob Rothschild, 4th Baron Rothschild retains the estate and a house at nearby Eythrope.

On 17 November 2017, near Waddesdon, there was a mid-air collision between an aeroplane and a helicopter, with four fatalities.

== Education ==
Waddesdon Village Primary School is a mixed, community, primary school, which has approximately 200 pupils from the age of four through to the age of eleven. The village is also home to Waddesdon Church of England School, a secondary school with over 1000 students.

== Notable residents ==
- Peter Palmer (died 1621), justice of the Court of Common Pleas (Ireland), was born in Waddesdon, where his family leased the main mansion house.
- Alice Shalvi

== Gallery ==
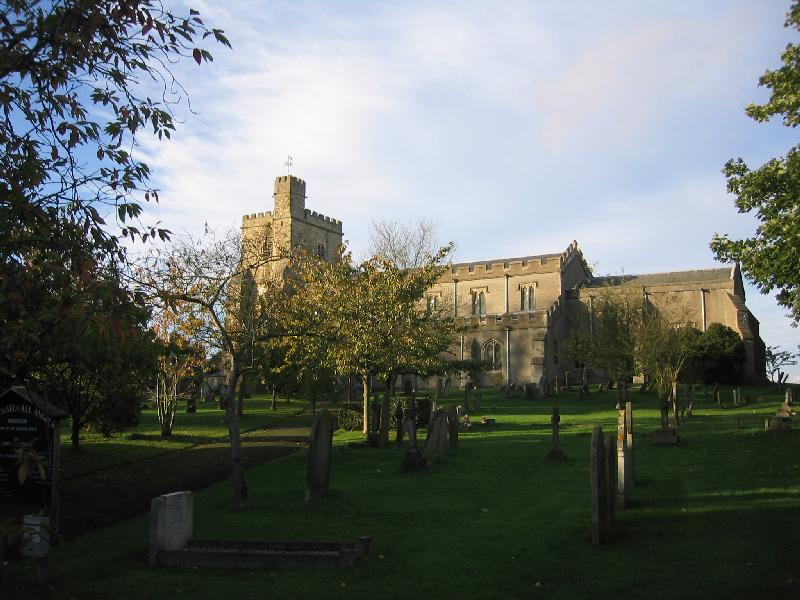
St Michael and All Angels Church

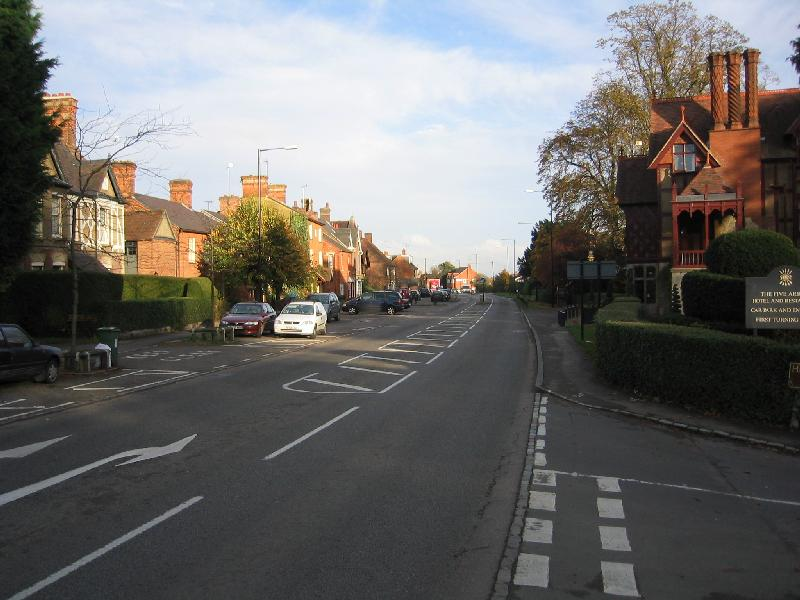
Waddesdon
