= Baron St John =

Barony in the Peerage of England

Arms of St John: Argent, on a chief gules two mullets or

Baron St John may refer to several different peerage titles:

== Peerage of England ==
=== Baron St John of Lageham ===
Created 1299 and dormant since 1353 (Lagham Manor, Surrey)

- John St. John, 1st Baron St. John of Lageham (d. 27 Jun 1316) m. Beatrix (Broy?)(St. John) Gyse
- John St. John, 2nd Baron St. John of Lageham (d. 16 Jun 1322) m. Margery Gyse
- John St. John, 3rd Baron St. John of Lageham (b. calculated 1309) m. Katherine de Say
- Roger St. John, 4th Baron St. John of Lageham (d. 28 Mar 1353); died without issue. The Barony became dormant and the manor of Lageham passed to descendants of his brothers.

=== Baron St John of Basing ===
Created 1299 and abeyant since 1429

=== Baron St John ===
Created 1539 and merged since 1551 with the Marquessate of Winchester

=== Baron St John of Bletso ===
Created 1559

- Oliver St John, 1st Baron St John of Bletso (d. 1582)
- John St John, 2nd Baron St John of Bletso (d. 1596)
- Oliver St John, 3rd Baron St John of Bletso (c. 1540–1618)
- Oliver St John, 1st Earl of Bolingbroke (4th Baron St John of Bletso) (d. 1646) (created Earl of Bolingbroke in 1624)

St John family tree: Earls of Bolingbroke and subsidiary and courtesy titles

Oliver St John d. 1437	Margaret Beauchamp c. 1410–before 1482	John Beaufort; 1404–1444; 1st Duke of Somerset
John St John d. c. 1482	Oliver St John d. c. 1497	Margaret Beaufort; 1443–1509; Countess of Richmond and Derby
John St John of Bletsoe c. 1450–after 1502	John St John	King Henry VII; 1457–1509
John St John; 1498–c. 1562	John St John; 1473–1512
Baron St John of Bletso, 1559
Oliver St John; 1516–1582; 1st Baron St John of Bletso	Nicholas St John d. 1589
Viscount Grandison of Limerick, 1620; Baron Tregoz of Highworth, 1626
John St John d. 1596; 2nd Baron St John of Bletso	Oliver St John c. 1540–1618; 3rd Baron St John of Bletso	John St. John c. 1552–1594	Oliver St. John; 1559–1630; 1st Viscount Grandison and Baron Tregoz of Highworth
Barony of Tregoz extinct, 1630
Earl of Bolingbroke, 1624	St John Baronet, of Lydiard Tregoze, 1611	See; Villiers family tree
Oliver St John c. 1580–1646; 1st Earl of Bolingbroke, 4th Baron St John of Bletso	Rowland St John; 1588–1645	John St John; 1585–1648; 1st Baronet St John of Lydiard Tregoze	Barbara St John	Edward Villiers c. 1585–1626
St John Baronet, of Woodford, 1660
Oliver St John; 1603–1642; 5th Baron St John of Bletso	Paulet St John d. 1638	Oliver St John c. 1624–1662; 1st Baronet St John of Woodford	Oliver St John; 1612/1613 – November 1641 or 1642	Walter St John; 1622–1708; 3rd Baronet St John of Lydiard Tregoze
Viscount St John and Baron St John of Battersea, 1716
Oliver St John before 1634–1688; 2nd Earl of Bolingbroke, 6th Baron St John of Bletso	Paulet St John; 1634–1711; 3rd Earl of Bolingbroke, 7th Baron St John of Bletso	St Andrew St John c. 1650–1709; 2nd Baronet St John of Woodford	John St John; 1638–1657; 2nd Baronet St John of Lydiard Tregoze	Henry St John baptized 1652–1742; 1st Viscount St John, etc., 4th Baronet St John of Lydiard Tregoze
Earldom of Bolingbroke extinct, 1711
Viscount Bolingbroke and Baron St John of Lydiard Tregoze, 1712
Oliver St John c. 1683–1710; 3rd Baronet St John of Woodford	St Andrew St John c. 1685–1711; 4th Baronet St John of Woodford	William St John d. 1720; 9th Baron St John of Bletso, 6th Baronet St John of Woodson	Rowland St John d. 1722; 10th Baron St John of Bletso, 7th Baronet St John of Woodson	John St John d. 1757; 11th Baron St John of Bletso, 8th Baronet St John of Woodson	Henry St John; 1678–1751; 1st Viscount Bolingbroke, etc.
Paulet St Andrew St John; 1711–1714; 8th Baron St John of Bletso, 5th Baronet St John of Woodford	John St Andrew St John; 1725–1767; 12th Baron St John of Bletso, 9th Baronet St John of Woodson	John St John; 1702–1748; 2nd Viscount St John, etc.
Frederick St John; 1732–1787; 3rd Viscount St John, etc., 2nd Viscount Bolingbroke, etc., 5th Baronet of Lydiard Tregoze
Henry Beauchamp St John; 1758–1805; 13th Baron St John of Bletso, 10th Baronet St John of Woodson	St Andrew St John; 1759–1817; 14th Baron St John of Bletso, 11th Baronet St John of Woodson	George Richard St John; 1761–1824; 4th Viscount St John, 3rd Viscount Bolingbroke, etc., 5th Baronet of Lydiard Tregoze	Ferdinand St. John; 1804–1865
St Andrew Beauchamp St John; 1811–1874; 15th Baron St John of Bletso, 12th Baronet St John of Woodson	Henry St John; 1786–1851; 5th Viscount St John, 4th Viscount Bolingbroke, etc., 6th Baronet of Lydiard Tregoze	Canon Maurice William Ferdinand St. John; 1827–1914
St Andrew St John; 1840–1887; 16th Baron St John of Bletso, 13th Baronet St John of Woodson	Beauchamp Moubray St John; 1844–1912; 17th Baron St John of Bletso, 14th Baronet St John of Woodson	Henry Mildmay St John; 1820–1899; 6th Viscount St John, 5th Viscount Bolingbroke, etc., 7th Baronet of Lydiard Tregoze	Henry Percy St John; 1854–1921••••
Henry Beauchamp Oliver St John; 1876–1920; 18th Baron St John of Bletso, 15th Baronet St John of Woodson	Moubray St Andrew Thornton St John; 1877–1934; 19th Baron St John of Bletso, 16th Baronet St John of Woodson	Rowland Tudor St John	Vernon Henry St John; 1896–1974; 7th Viscount St John, 6th Viscount Bolingbroke, etc., 8th Baronet of Lydiard Tregoze	Geoffrey Robert St. John; 1889–1972
John Moubray Russell St John; 1917–1976; 20th Baron St John of Bletso, 17th Baronet St John of Woodson	Andrew Beauchamp St John; 1918–1978; 21st Baron St John of Bletso, 18th Baronet St John of Woodson	Kenneth Oliver Musgrave St John; 1927–2010; 8th Viscount St John, 7th Viscount Bolingbroke, etc., 9th Baronet of Lydiard Tregoze
Anthony Tudor St John b. 1957; 22nd Baron St John of Bletso, 19th Baronet St John of Woodson	Henry FitzRoy St John; 1957–2011; 9th Viscount St John, 8th Viscount Bolingbroke, etc., and 8th Baron St John of Battersea, 10th Baronet of Lydiard Tregoze
Nicholas Alexander Mowbray St John b. 1974; 10th Viscount St John, 9th Viscount Bolingbroke, etc., 12th Baronet of Lydiard Tregoze
Oliver Beauchamp St John b. 1995

== Peerage of Great Britain ==
- Baron St John of Lydiard Tregoze, created 1712, as a subsidiary title of the Viscountcy of Bolingbroke
- Baron St John of Battersea, created 1716 as a subsidiary title of the Viscountcy of St John

== Peerage of the United Kingdom ==
- Baron St John of Fawsley, life peerage 1987–2012
