= Viscount Bolingbroke =

Viscountcy in the Peerage of Great Britain

Viscountcy Bolingbroke
- Arms of St John: Argent, on a chief gules two mullets or
- Creation date: 7 July 1712
- Created by: Queen Anne
- Peerage: Peerage of Great Britain
- First holder: Henry St John
- Present holder: Nicholas Alexander Mowbray St. John, 9th Viscount Bolingbroke, 10th Viscount St John
- Remainder to: the 1st Viscount's heirs male of the body lawfully begotten, with remainder, failing his own male issue, to his father and the heirs male of his body.
- Subsidiary titles: Viscount St John; Baron St John of Lydiard Tregoze; Baron St John of Battersea; St John baronets, of Lydiard Tregoze

Viscount Bolingbroke (Note: Pronounced /bʊlɪŋbrʊk/) is a current title in the Peerage of Great Britain created in 1712 for Henry St John. He was simultaneously made Baron St John, of Lydiard Tregoze in the County of Wilts. Since 1751, the titles are merged with the titles of Viscount St John and Baron St John in the same peerage.

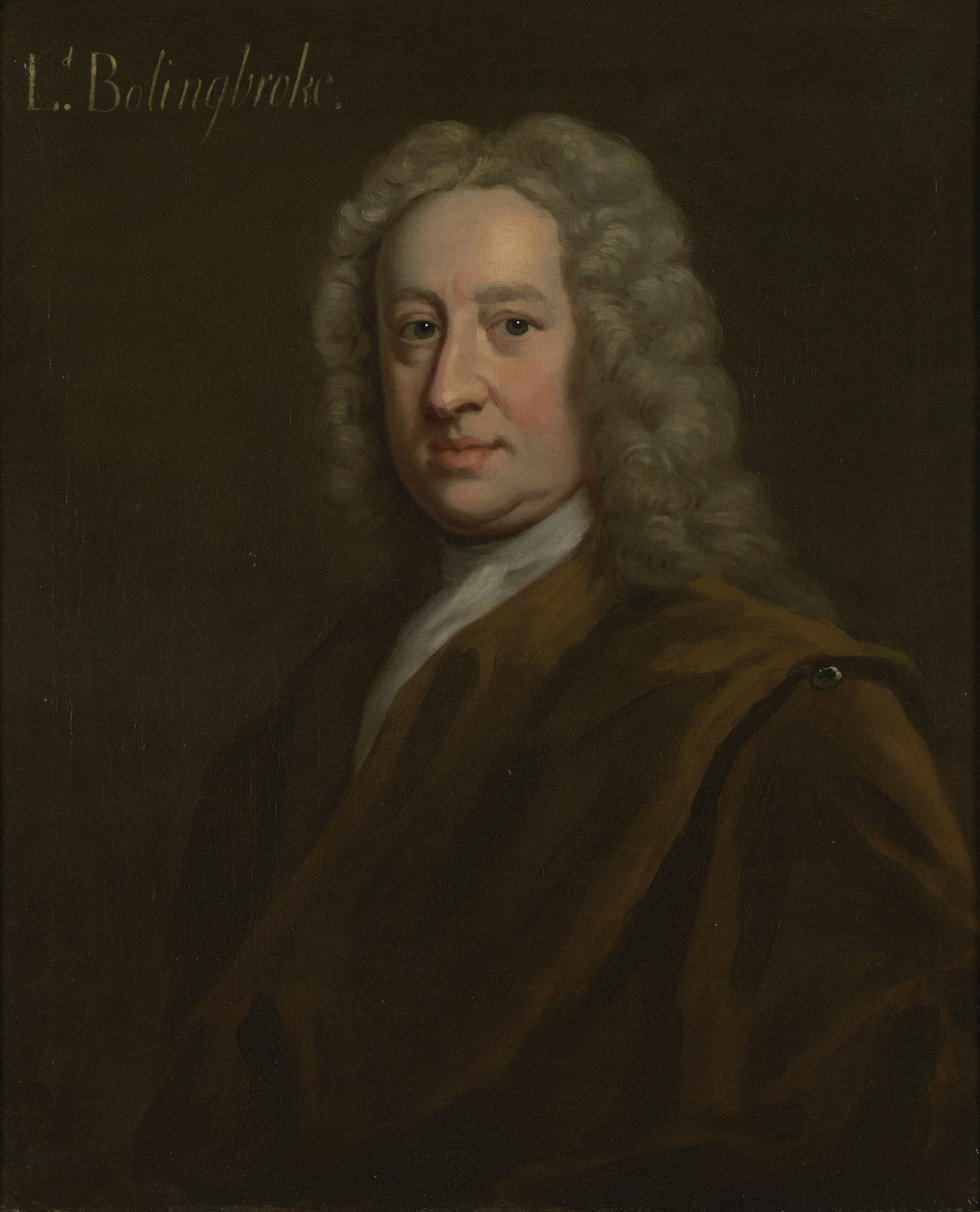
Henry St John, 1st Viscount Bolingbroke

== Family background ==
John St John (1585–1648) was the nephew of Oliver St John, 1st Viscount Grandison (1559–1630), lord deputy governor of Ireland from 1616 to 1622, and distant cousin of the Barons St John of Bletsoe, later Earls of Bolingbroke.

== Grants of titles ==
=== Baronetcy in 1611 ===
John St John later represented Wiltshire in Parliament and was a strong royalist during the Civil War. On 22 May 1611, he was created a Baronet, of Lydiard Tregoze in Wiltshire, in the Baronetage of England.

=== Baronies and viscountcies ===
The titles Baron St John, of Lydiard Tregoze in the County of Wilts, and Viscount Bolingbroke were created in the Peerage of Great Britain in 1712 for the politician and orator the Hon. Henry St John, the eldest son of Henry St John, 4th Baronet. The peerages were created with remainder to his father and his male heirs. Lord Bolingbroke died childless and was succeeded according to the special remainder by his nephew, who had already succeeded as third Viscount St John in 1749 (see below).

Henry St John, 4th Baronet was elected MP for Wiltshire and Wootton Bassett, Wiltshire. In 1716 he was created Baron St John, of Battersea in the County of Surrey, and Viscount St John, with remainder to his second son (who inherited) and in default third son, as his eldest son Henry St John had already been created Viscount Bolingbroke in 1712 (see above). The 2nd Viscount St John also represented Wootton Bassett in Parliament. In 1751 his son, the 3rd Viscount, succeeded his uncle as 2nd Viscount Bolingbroke and 2nd Baron St John according to a special remainder in the letters patent.

The titles have remained united since. The 3rd Viscount Bolingbroke was elected briefly for Cricklade, Wiltshire. As of 2014 the titles are held by his descendant, the 8th Viscount Bolingbroke and 9th Viscount St John. He lives in New Zealand. As of 24 October 2025, he has not successfully proven his succession and is therefore not on the Official Roll of the Baronetage, with the baronetcy considered dormant since 1974.

== Family seats and abodes ==
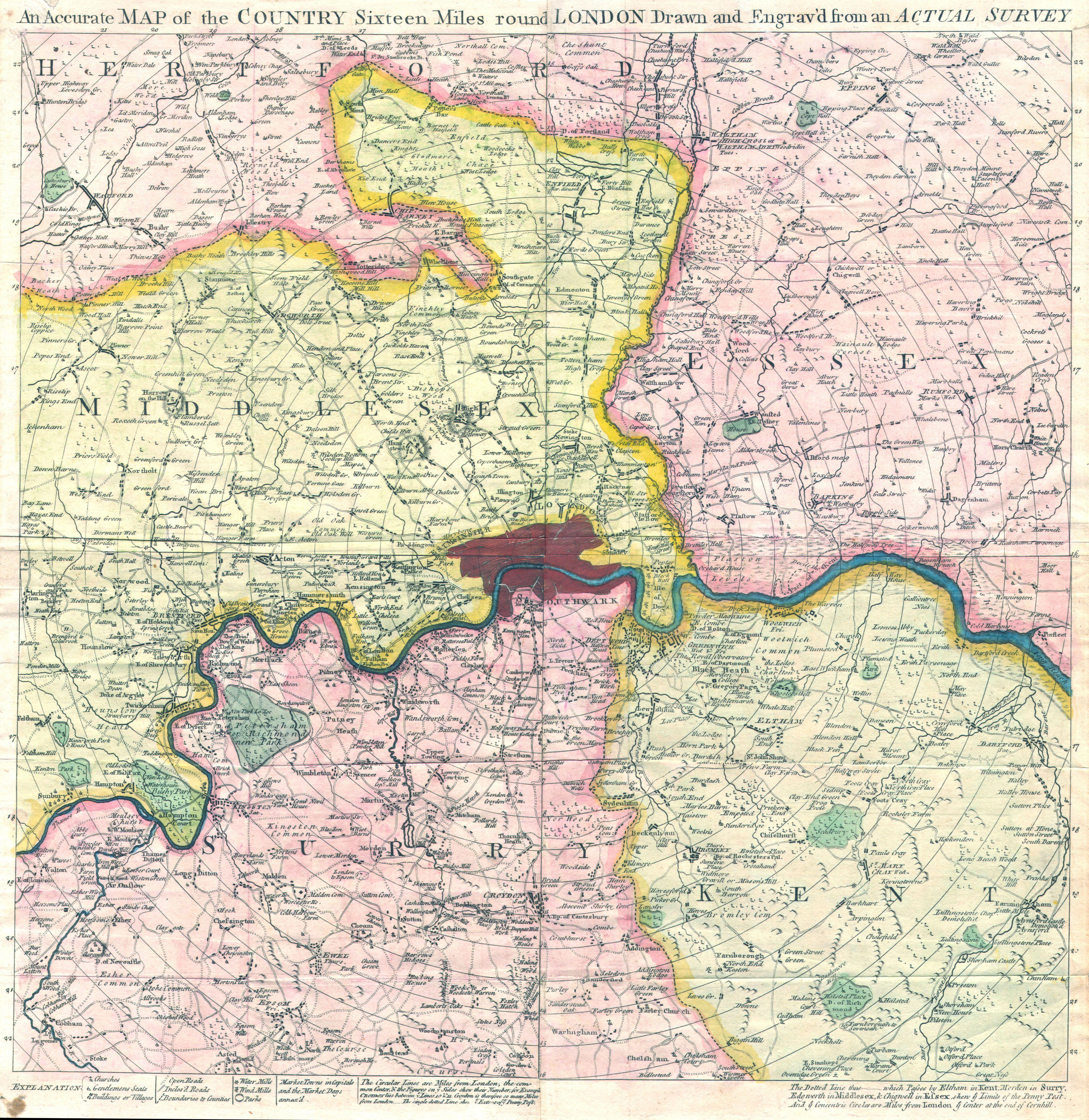
Extract from Gentleman's Magazine: Map of London & Environs, 1764; Lord Bolingbroke is noted in this part of today's London.

An established family seat was, from 1420 until sale in 1943, Lydiard House, Lydiard Tregoze, Wiltshire.

From 1648 until 1765 the family had a house near to London, namely the forerunner to the wider Battersea Park area, Bolingbroke House, which was then in the county of Surrey. This became the de facto seat of the lord of the manor title inherited from the 1st Baronet from Viscount Grandison, buried there with great pomp in 1648. In 1742 the then Lord Bolingbroke, who, in spite of his attainder, had been enabled to inherit the estate by an act of Parliament, the Henry St John Bolingbroke Restitution Act 1724 (11 Geo. 1. c. 40), lent the manor house to his friend Hugh Hume, 3rd Earl of Marchmont. Later he settled there himself, either in 1743 or early in the following year and there spent the remainder of his life. He was buried in the family vault in Battersea Church in 1751. His nephew and heir Frederick, second Viscount Bolingbroke, sold the Battersea estate about 1763. It was purchased by John Viscount Spencer, created Earl Spencer in 1765.

== Coat of arms ==
Armorial bearings of St John, Viscounts Bolingbroke

The heraldic blazon for the armorials of the St John family is: Argent, on a chief gules two mullets or. This can be translated as: a white shield with a red rectangle at the top holding two golden stars.

== St John Baronets, of Lydiard Tregoze (1611) ==
- Sir John St John, 1st Baronet (d. 1648)
- Sir John St John, 2nd Baronet (1638–1657)
- Sir Walter St John, 3rd Baronet (1622–1708)
- Sir Henry St John, 4th Baronet (1652–1742) (created Viscount St John and Baron St John of Battersea in 1716)

see below for further succession

== Viscounts Bolingbroke and Barons St John of Lydiard Tregoze (1712) ==
- Henry St John, 1st Viscount Bolingbroke (1678–1751)
- Frederick St John, 2nd Viscount Bolingbroke and 3rd Viscount St John (1732–1787)
- George St John, 3rd Viscount Bolingbroke and 4th Viscount St John (1761–1824)
- Henry St John, 4th Viscount Bolingbroke and 5th Viscount St John (1786–1851)
- Henry St John, 5th Viscount Bolingbroke and 6th Viscount St John (1820–1899)
- Vernon Henry St John, 6th Viscount Bolingbroke and 7th Viscount St John (1896–1974)
- Kenneth Oliver Musgrave St John, 7th Viscount Bolingbroke and 8th Viscount St John (1927–2010)
- Henry FitzRoy St John, 8th Viscount Bolingbroke and 9th Viscount St John (1957–2011)
- Nicholas Alexander Mowbray St. John, 9th Viscount Bolingbroke and 10th Viscount St John (b. 1974)

== Viscounts St John and Barons St John of Battersea (1716) ==
- Henry St John, 1st Viscount St John (1652–1742)
- John St John, 2nd Viscount St John (c. 1695–1749)
- Frederick St John, 3rd Viscount St John (1732–1787) (succeeded as 2nd Viscount Bolingbroke)

see above for further succession

== Family tree ==
St John family tree: Earls of Bolingbroke and subsidiary and courtesy titles

Oliver St John d. 1437	Margaret Beauchamp c. 1410–before 1482	John Beaufort; 1404–1444; 1st Duke of Somerset
John St John d. c. 1482	Oliver St John d. c. 1497	Margaret Beaufort; 1443–1509; Countess of Richmond and Derby
John St John of Bletsoe c. 1450–after 1502	John St John	King Henry VII; 1457–1509
John St John; 1498–c. 1562	John St John; 1473–1512
Baron St John of Bletso, 1559
Oliver St John; 1516–1582; 1st Baron St John of Bletso	Nicholas St John d. 1589
Viscount Grandison of Limerick, 1620; Baron Tregoz of Highworth, 1626
John St John d. 1596; 2nd Baron St John of Bletso	Oliver St John c. 1540–1618; 3rd Baron St John of Bletso	John St. John c. 1552–1594	Oliver St. John; 1559–1630; 1st Viscount Grandison and Baron Tregoz of Highworth
Barony of Tregoz extinct, 1630
Earl of Bolingbroke, 1624	St John Baronet, of Lydiard Tregoze, 1611	See; Villiers family tree
Oliver St John c. 1580–1646; 1st Earl of Bolingbroke, 4th Baron St John of Bletso	Rowland St John; 1588–1645	John St John; 1585–1648; 1st Baronet St John of Lydiard Tregoze	Barbara St John	Edward Villiers c. 1585–1626
St John Baronet, of Woodford, 1660
Oliver St John; 1603–1642; 5th Baron St John of Bletso	Paulet St John d. 1638	Oliver St John c. 1624–1662; 1st Baronet St John of Woodford	Oliver St John; 1612/1613 – November 1641 or 1642	Walter St John; 1622–1708; 3rd Baronet St John of Lydiard Tregoze
Viscount St John and Baron St John of Battersea, 1716
Oliver St John before 1634–1688; 2nd Earl of Bolingbroke, 6th Baron St John of Bletso	Paulet St John; 1634–1711; 3rd Earl of Bolingbroke, 7th Baron St John of Bletso	St Andrew St John c. 1650–1709; 2nd Baronet St John of Woodford	John St John; 1638–1657; 2nd Baronet St John of Lydiard Tregoze	Henry St John baptized 1652–1742; 1st Viscount St John, etc., 4th Baronet St John of Lydiard Tregoze
Earldom of Bolingbroke extinct, 1711
Viscount Bolingbroke and Baron St John of Lydiard Tregoze, 1712
Oliver St John c. 1683–1710; 3rd Baronet St John of Woodford	St Andrew St John c. 1685–1711; 4th Baronet St John of Woodford	William St John d. 1720; 9th Baron St John of Bletso, 6th Baronet St John of Woodson	Rowland St John d. 1722; 10th Baron St John of Bletso, 7th Baronet St John of Woodson	John St John d. 1757; 11th Baron St John of Bletso, 8th Baronet St John of Woodson	Henry St John; 1678–1751; 1st Viscount Bolingbroke, etc.
Paulet St Andrew St John; 1711–1714; 8th Baron St John of Bletso, 5th Baronet St John of Woodford	John St Andrew St John; 1725–1767; 12th Baron St John of Bletso, 9th Baronet St John of Woodson	John St John; 1702–1748; 2nd Viscount St John, etc.
Frederick St John; 1732–1787; 3rd Viscount St John, etc., 2nd Viscount Bolingbroke, etc., 5th Baronet of Lydiard Tregoze
Henry Beauchamp St John; 1758–1805; 13th Baron St John of Bletso, 10th Baronet St John of Woodson	St Andrew St John; 1759–1817; 14th Baron St John of Bletso, 11th Baronet St John of Woodson	George Richard St John; 1761–1824; 4th Viscount St John, 3rd Viscount Bolingbroke, etc., 5th Baronet of Lydiard Tregoze	Ferdinand St. John; 1804–1865
St Andrew Beauchamp St John; 1811–1874; 15th Baron St John of Bletso, 12th Baronet St John of Woodson	Henry St John; 1786–1851; 5th Viscount St John, 4th Viscount Bolingbroke, etc., 6th Baronet of Lydiard Tregoze	Canon Maurice William Ferdinand St. John; 1827–1914
St Andrew St John; 1840–1887; 16th Baron St John of Bletso, 13th Baronet St John of Woodson	Beauchamp Moubray St John; 1844–1912; 17th Baron St John of Bletso, 14th Baronet St John of Woodson	Henry Mildmay St John; 1820–1899; 6th Viscount St John, 5th Viscount Bolingbroke, etc., 7th Baronet of Lydiard Tregoze	Henry Percy St John; 1854–1921••••
Henry Beauchamp Oliver St John; 1876–1920; 18th Baron St John of Bletso, 15th Baronet St John of Woodson	Moubray St Andrew Thornton St John; 1877–1934; 19th Baron St John of Bletso, 16th Baronet St John of Woodson	Rowland Tudor St John	Vernon Henry St John; 1896–1974; 7th Viscount St John, 6th Viscount Bolingbroke, etc., 8th Baronet of Lydiard Tregoze	Geoffrey Robert St. John; 1889–1972
John Moubray Russell St John; 1917–1976; 20th Baron St John of Bletso, 17th Baronet St John of Woodson	Andrew Beauchamp St John; 1918–1978; 21st Baron St John of Bletso, 18th Baronet St John of Woodson	Kenneth Oliver Musgrave St John; 1927–2010; 8th Viscount St John, 7th Viscount Bolingbroke, etc., 9th Baronet of Lydiard Tregoze
Anthony Tudor St John b. 1957; 22nd Baron St John of Bletso, 19th Baronet St John of Woodson	Henry FitzRoy St John; 1957–2011; 9th Viscount St John, 8th Viscount Bolingbroke, etc., and 8th Baron St John of Battersea, 10th Baronet of Lydiard Tregoze
Nicholas Alexander Mowbray St John b. 1974; 10th Viscount St John, 9th Viscount Bolingbroke, etc., 12th Baronet of Lydiard Tregoze
Oliver Beauchamp St John b. 1995

== See also ==
- Baron St John
- Earl of Bolingbroke
- Viscount Grandison
- Earl of Orkney
