= St John (name) =

StJohn or St.John or St John or St. John or Sinjin or Sinjun is a given name and surname. It can be pronounced /ˈsɪndʒɪn/ or /-ʒən/ sometimes in some places, particularly if it is the first part of a hyphenated family name or a given name. Use of the full stop separator (period) is uncommon in some countries, especially those that use Commonwealth English.

== People with the given name ==
- St John Pettifor Catchpool (1890–1971), English Quaker relief worker
- St. John Ellis (1964–2005), British Rugby League player
- St John Ervine (1883–1971), Irish writer
- St John Groser (1890–1966), Anglican priest and Christian socialist
- St John Hornby (1867–1946), British businessman
- St John Horsfall (1910–1949), British motor racing driver
- St John Brodrick, 1st Earl of Midleton (1856–1942), British politician
- St John O'Neill (1741–1790), Irish MP for Randalstown
- Saint-John Perse, pseudonym of Alexis Leger (1887–1975), French poet and diplomat
- St John Philby (1885–1960), British civil servant and explorer in Arabia
- Emily St. John Mandel (1979–), Canadian writer

== Fictional characters with the given name ==
- St. John Allerdyce, real name of Pyro, a supervillain from Marvel Comics
- St John Colchester, in the Torchwood audio drama series
- St. John Hawke, in the American TV series Airwolf
- St. John Quartermaine, in Quartermaine's Terms, the play by Simon Gray
- St. John Rivers, clergyman in Charlotte Brontë's Jane Eyre
- St. John Talbot, in the film Star Trek V: The Final Frontier
- St. John Powell, partner of fictional advertising firm Putnam, Powell and Lowe in the American TV series Mad Men
- James St. John Smythe, alias used by fictional spy James Bond while posing as a horse buyer in A View to a Kill
- St. John Smythe, alias again used by fictional spy James Bond while visiting Vietnam in 007 First Light
- Deacon St. John, in the video game Days Gone
- St. John Gurney-Clifford, in British TV series Grantchester
- St. John Smallwood, law partner at Cathcarts, in the British-American TV series War

== People with the surname ==
- Alex St. John, American programmer
- Al St. John, American comic actor
- Ambrose St. John (1815–1875), English priest and convert to Catholicism
- Andrew St. John, American actor
- Andrew St. John (bishop), Australian bishop
- Annie St John, British television presenter
- Archer St. John (1904–1955), American comic book publisher
- Austin St. John, American actor
- Bayle St. John, British writer
- Bert St. John, Australian tennis player
- Betta St. John, American actress
- Beverly St. John, American church elder
- Bridget St John, British singer
- Caroline St John-Brooks, English journalist
- Charles St. John, 19th-century U.S. Representative from New York
- Charles Edward St. John (1857–1935), American astronomer
- Cheryl St. John, American author
- Cornelia Laws St. John (died 1902), American poet
- Cynthia Morgan St. John (1852–1919), American Wordsworthian, book collector, and author
- Daniel B. St. John, 19th-century U.S. Representative from New York
- Dai St. John, Welsh heavyweight boxer
- David St. John, American poet
- Del St. John, Canadian hockey player
- Douglas St. John, New Zealand cricketer
- Earl St. John, American-born producer
- Edward St John (1916–1994), Australian politician
- Eugenia F. St. John, American evangelist and lecturer
- Florence St. John, English actress and singer
- Frederick St John, 2nd Viscount Bolingbroke
- George St John, 3rd Viscount Bolingbroke
- Georgie Boyden St. John (1861–1899), American composer
- Gina St. John, American actress
- Harold St. John, American botanist
- Harold Bernard St. John, Barbadian politician
- Helen St. John, American musician
- Henry St John, 1st Viscount Bolingbroke (1678–1751), English statesman and philosopher
- Henry St. John (congressman), 19th-century U.S. Representative from Ohio
- Henry Beauchamp St John, British Army officer
- Howard St. John, American actor
- Ian St John (1938–2021), Scottish footballer, manager and pundit
- Isaac M. St. John (1827–1880), Confederate States Army brigadier general during the American Civil War
- J. Allen St. John, American author, artist and illustrator
- James Augustus St. John (1795–1875), British author and traveller
- Jane Martha St. John (1801–1882), British amateur photographer
- Jeff St John (1946-2018), Australian musician
- Jill St. John, American film and television actress
- John St. John (disambiguation), several people
- Jon St. John, American voice actor and singer
- Joseph St. John, Canadian politician
- Jude St. John, Canadian football league player
- Julia St. John, English actress
- Kate St John, British musician and composer
- Kristoff St. John, American actor
- Lara St. John, Canadian violinist
- Locke St. John, American baseball player
- Lynn St. John, American sports coach
- Madeleine St John, Australian author
- Marco St. John, American actor
- Mark St. John, American guitarist
- Mary Louise St. John, American nun
- Mia St. John, American boxer
- Norman St John-Stevas, Baron St John of Fawsley, British politician
- Oliver St John (ca. 1598–1673), English statesman and judge
- Oliver St John (civil servant), British administrator of India
- Orestes St. John (1841–1921), American geologist and paleontologist
- Pat St. John, American DJ
- Patricia St. John, British writer
- Pete St. John, Irish singer
- Powell St. John, American singer and songwriter
- Ray St. John, British musician
- Richard Fleming St Andrew St John (1839–1919), English orientalist
- Robert St. John (1902–2003), American author, broadcaster, and journalist
- Scott St. John, Canadian musician
- Sharmagne Leland-St. John, Native American poet
- Spenser St. John, British Consul in Brunei (19th century)
- Trevor St. John, American actor
- Warren St. John, American author

Baronets of Lydiard Tregoze (1611)

- Sir John St John, 1st Baronet (1585–1648), Member of Parliament and prominent Royalist

Barons St John of Bletso (1559)

- John St John, 2nd Baron St John of Bletso (died 1596)
- Oliver St John, 5th Baron St John of Bletso
  - Oliver St John, 1st Earl of Bolingbroke (1580?–1646), known from 1618 until 1624 as 4th Baron St John of Bletso, English nobleman and politician
- Paulet St Andrew St John, 8th Baron St John of Bletso
- John St John, 11th Baron St John of Bletso (died 1757)
- John St John, 12th Baron St John of Bletso (died 1767)
- St Andrew St John, 14th Baron St John of Bletso
- St Andrew St John, 15th Baron St John of Bletso
- Beauchamp St John, 17th Baron St John of Bletso
- Mowbray St John, 19th Baron St John of Bletso
- John St John, 20th Baron St John of Bletso (1917–1976)
- Anthony St John, 22nd Baron St John of Bletso

== Fictional characters with the surname ==
- Alexandria St. John, in the American TV series The Vampire Diaries
- Dalton St. John, in the American TV series The Vampire Diaries
- Deacon St. John, protagonist in the video game Days Gone
- Mick St. John, one of the main characters in the American TV series Moonlight
- Peter St. John (Mandala), in the British comic book series Zenith
- Lorenzo St. John, a vampire in the American TV series The Vampire Diaries
- Virginia St. John, in the American TV series The Vampire Diaries

== See also ==
- St John-Mildmay Baronets
- St John Baronets, of Northwood (1660)
- Viscount Bolingbroke
