= Earl of Bolingbroke =

Peerage of England

The title Earl of Bolingbroke has been created twice, once in the Peerage of England and once in the Jacobite Peerage.

== Initial creation ==
The creation in the Peerage of England occurred on 28 December 1624, when Oliver St John, 4th Baron St John of Bletso, was created Earl of Bolingbroke. His eldest son and heir apparent, Oliver St John, was in 1641 summoned to the House of Lords through a writ of acceleration in his father's junior title of Baron St John of Bletsoe. However, he predeceased his father (killed at the Battle of Edgehill in 1642); nevertheless, the writ of acceleration means that he is formally known as the fifth Baron St John of Bletsoe. The Earl was succeeded by his grandson, Oliver St John, 2nd Earl of Bolingbroke, who was the son of Sir Paulet St John, younger son of the first Earl. The 2nd Earl died childless in 1688 and was succeeded by his younger brother, Paulet St John, 3rd Earl of Bolingbroke, who represented Bedford in the House of Commons. He never married, and on his death, on 5 October 1711, the earldom became extinct.

== List of Earls of Bolingbroke (1st creation) ==
- Oliver St John, 1st Earl of Bolingbroke, 4th Baron St John of Bletso (c. 1580–1646)
  - Oliver St John, 5th Baron St John of Bletso (1603–1642) (by writ of acceleration)
- Oliver St John, 2nd Earl of Bolingbroke, 6th Baron St John of Bletso (before 1634–1688)
- Paulet St John, 3rd Earl of Bolingbroke, 7th Baron St John of Bletso (1634–1711)

== Second creation ==
The creation in the Jacobite Peerage occurred on 26 July 1715 when Henry St John, 1st Viscount Bolingbroke, was created Earl of Bolingbroke by the Old Pretender, this title not being recognised by the British Government, although Bolingbroke returned from exile, was pardoned, and briefly returned to royal favour. He died on 12 December 1751, aged 73, his second wife having predeceased him by one year, and the Jacobite earldom became extinct. Bolingbroke and his wife were both buried in St Mary's Church, Battersea, where a monument with medallions and inscriptions composed by Bolingbroke was erected to their memory. Bolingbroke's great-nephew Frederick St John, succeeded him in the viscountcy.

== Family tree ==
St John family tree: Earls of Bolingbroke, Earls of Jersey and subsidiary and courtesy titles

Oliver St John d. 1437 | Margaret Beauchamp c. 1410–before 1482 | John Beaufort; 1404–1444; 1st Duke of Somerset
John St John d. c. 1482 | Oliver St John d. c. 1497 | Margaret Beaufort; 1443–1509; Countess of Richmond and Derby
John St John c. 1450–after 1502 | John St John; 1473–1512 | King Henry VII; 1457–1509
John St John d. c. 1562 | John St John; 1473–1512
Baron St John of Bletso, 1559
Oliver St John c. 1522–1582; 1st Baron St John of Bletso | Nicholas St John d. 1589
Viscount Grandison of Limerick, 1620; Baron Tregoz of Highworth, 1626
John St John d. 1596; 2nd Baron St John of Bletso | Oliver St John c. 1540–1618; 3rd Baron St John of Bletso | John St. John c. 1552–1594 | Oliver St. John c. 1560–1630; 1st Viscount Grandison and Baron Tregoz of Highworth | George Villiers c. 1544–1606 | Mary Villiers c. 1570–1632; Countess of Buckingham
Barony of Tregoz extinct, 1630
Earl of Bolingbroke, 1624 | St John Baronet, of Lydiard Tregoze, 1611
Oliver St John c. 1580–1646; 1st Earl of Bolingbroke, 4th Baron St John of Bletso | Rowland St John; 1588–1645 | John St John; 1585–1648; 1st Baronet St John of Lydiard Tregoze | Barbara St John | Edward Villiers c. 1585–1626 | See; Villiers family tree
St John Baronet, of Woodford, 1660
Oliver St John; 1603–1642; 5th Baron St John of Bletso | Paulet St John d. 1638 | Oliver St John c. 1624–1662; 1st Baronet St John of Woodford | Oliver St John; 1612/1613 – November 1641 or 1642 | Walter St John; 1622–1708; 3rd Baronet St John of Lydiard Tregoze | William Villiers; 1614–1643; 2nd Viscount Grandison | John Villiers c. 1616–1659; 3rd Viscount Grandison | George Villiers; 1618–1699; 4th Viscount Grandison | Edward Villiers; 1620–1689
Viscount St John and Baron St John of Battersea, 1716 | Viscount Villiers, 1691; Earl of Jersey, 1697
Oliver St John before 1634–1688; 2nd Earl of Bolingbroke, 6th Baron St John of Bletso | Paulet St John; 1634–1711; 3rd Earl of Bolingbroke, 7th Baron St John of Bletso | St Andrew St John c. 1650–1709; 2nd Baronet St John of Woodford | John St John; 1638–1657; 2nd Baronet St John of Lydiard Tregoze | Henry St John baptized 1652–1742; 1st Viscount St John and Baron St John of Battersea, 4th Baronet St John of Lydiard Tregoze | Barbara Palmer; 1640–1709; Duchess of Cleveland, Countess of Castlemaine, Baroness Nonsuch | King Charles II; 1630–1685 | Edward FitzGerald-Villiers c. 1654–1693 | Edward Villiers c. 1656–1711; 1st Earl of Jersey and Viscount Villiers
Earldom of Bolingbroke extinct, 1711
Viscount Bolingbroke and Baron St John of Lydiard Tregoze, 1712 | Earl Grandison, 1721
Oliver St John c. 1683–1710; 3rd Baronet St John of Woodford | St Andrew St John c. 1685–1711; 4th Baronet St John of Woodford | William St John d. 1720; 9th Baron St John of Bletso, 6th Baronet St John of Woodson | Rowland St John d. 1722; 10th Baron St John of Bletso, 7th Baronet St John of Woodson | John St John d. 1757; 11th Baron St John of Bletso, 8th Baronet St John of Woodson | Henry St John; 1678–1751; 1st Viscount Bolingbroke and Baron St John of Lydiard Tregoze | John Villiers c. 1684–1766; 1st Earl Grandison, 5th Viscount Grandison | William Villiers c. 1682–1721; 2nd Earl of Jersey and Viscount Villiers
Earldom Grandison extinct, 1766
Paulet St Andrew St John; 1711–1714; 8th Baron St John of Bletso, 5th Baronet St John of Woodford | John St Andrew St John; 1725–1767; 12th Baron St John of Bletso, 9th Baronet St John of Woodson | John St John; 1702–1748; 2nd Viscount St John and Baron St John of Battersea | William Villiers d. 1769; 3rd Earl of Jersey and Viscount Villiers, 6th Viscount Grandison
Frederick St John; 1732–1787; 3rd Viscount St John, 2nd Viscount Bolingbroke, Baron St John of Lydiard Tregoze, and Baron St John of Battersea, 5th Baronet of Lydiard Tregoze | George Bussy Villiers; 1735–1805; 4th Earl of Jersey and Viscount Villiers, 7th Viscount Grandison
Henry Beauchamp St John; 1758–1805; 13th Baron St John of Bletso, 10th Baronet St John of Woodson | St Andrew St John; 1759–1817; 14th Baron St John of Bletso, 11th Baronet St John of Woodson | George Richard St John; 1761–1824; 4th Viscount St John, 3rd Viscount Bolingbroke, Baron St John of Lydiard Tregoze, and Baron St John of Battersea, 5th Baronet of Lydiard Tregoze | Ferdinand St. John; 1804–1865 | George Child Villiers; 1773–1859; 5th Earl of Jersey and Viscount Villiers, 8th Viscount Grandison
St Andrew Beauchamp St John; 1811–1874; 15th Baron St John of Bletso, 12th Baronet St John of Woodson | Henry St John; 1786–1851; 5th Viscount St John, 4th Viscount Bolingbroke, Baron St John of Lydiard Tregoze, and Baron St John of Battersea, 6th Baronet of Lydiard Tregoze | Canon Maurice William Ferdinand St. John; 1827–1914 | George Augustus Frederick Child Villiers; 1808–1859; 6th Earl of Jersey and Viscount Villiers, 9th Viscount Grandison
St Andrew St John; 1840–1887; 16th Baron St John of Bletso, 13th Baronet St John of Woodson | Beauchamp Moubray St John; 1844–1912; 17th Baron St John of Bletso, 14th Baronet St John of Woodson | Henry Mildmay St John; 1820–1899; 6th Viscount St John, 5th Viscount Bolingbroke, Baron St John of Lydiard Tregoze, and Baron St John of Battersea, 7th Baronet of Lydiard Tregoze | Henry Percy St John (1854–1921) | Victor Albert George Child Villiers; 1845–1915; 7th Earl of Jersey and Viscount Villiers, 10th Viscount Grandison
Henry Beauchamp Oliver St John; 1876–1920; 18th Baron St John of Bletso, 15th Baronet St John of Woodson | Moubray St Andrew Thornton St John; 1877–1934; 19th Baron St John of Bletso, 16th Baronet St John of Woodson | Rowland Tudor St John | Vernon Henry St John; 1896–1974; 7th Viscount St John, 6th Viscount Bolingbroke, Baron St John of Lydiard Tregoze, and Baron St John of Battersea, 8th Baronet of Lydiard Tregoze | Geoffrey Robert St. John; 1889–1972 | George Henry Robert Child Villiers; 1873–1923; 8th Earl of Jersey and Viscount Villiers, 11th Viscount Grandison
John Moubray Russell St John; 1917–1976; 20th Baron St John of Bletso, 17th Baronet St John of Woodson | Andrew Beauchamp St John; 1918–1978; 21st Baron St John of Bletso, 18th Baronet St John of Woodson | Kenneth Oliver Musgrave St John; 1927–2010; 8th Viscount St John, 7th Viscount Bolingbroke, Baron St John of Lydiard Tregoze, and Baron St John of Battersea, 9th Baronet of Lydiard Tregoze | George Francis Child-Villiers; 1910–1998; 9th Earl of Jersey and Viscount Villiers, 12th Viscount Grandison
Anthony Tudor St John b. 1957; 22nd Baron St John of Bletso, 19th Baronet St John of Woodson | Henry FitzRoy St John; 1957–2011; 9th Viscount St John, 8th Viscount Bolingbroke, Baron St John of Lydiard Tregoze, and 8th Baron St John of Battersea, 10th Baronet of Lydiard Tregoze | George Henry Child Villiers; 1948–1998 styled Viscount Villiers
Nicholas Alexander Mowbray St John b. 1974; 10th Viscount St John, 9th Viscount Bolingbroke, Baron St John of Lydiard Tregoze, and Baron St John of Battersea, 12th Baronet of Lydiard Tregoze | George Francis William Child Villiers b. 1976; 10th Earl of Jersey and Viscount Villiers, 13th Viscount Grandison
Oliver Beauchamp St John b. 1995 | George Henry William Child Villiers b. 2015 styled Viscount Villiers
