= John St. John =

John St. John may refer to:

== Politicians ==
- Sir John St John (died 1302), English landowner, soldier, administrator and diplomat
- Sir John St. John (MP for Northamptonshire) (aft.1360–1424), MP for Northamptonshire in 1410, 1411, 1416, and 1421
- Sir John St John (Bedfordshire MP) (bef. 1495–1558), MP for Bedfordshire, 1539, 1542
- Sir John St. John (MP for Bletchingley) (died 1576), MP for Bletchingley in 1529
- Sir John St John, 1st Baronet (1585–1648), MP for Wiltshire and prominent Royalist during the English Civil War
- John St John, 2nd Viscount St John (1702–1748), British politician, MP for Wootton Bassett
- John St John (died 1793) (c.1746–1793), MP for Newport, IoW 1773 and 1780 and Eye 1774–1780, Surveyor General of Crown Lands, 1775
- John St. John (American politician) (1833–1916), governor of Kansas and a candidate for President of the United States
- John J. St. John (1857–1930), merchant and politician in Newfoundland
- Jack St. John (1906–1965), politician in Manitoba, Canada

== Others ==
- John St John, 2nd Baron St John of Bletso (died 1596), English peer
- John P. St. John (police officer) (1918–1995), known as "Jigsaw John", American police officer and Los Angeles Police Department homicide detective
- John St. John, guitarist of Sounds Incorporated
- John St John, 11th Baron St John of Bletso (died 1757), British peer
- John St John, 12th Baron St John of Bletso (1725–1767), British peer
- John St John, 20th Baron St John of Bletso (1917–1976), English peer
- Ian St John (born John St John, 1938–2021), Scottish footballer

== See also ==
- Jon St. John (born 1960), American voice actor and singer
- John of St John (died 1253), English-born clergyman in Ireland, bishop of Ferns
- St John (name)
