= Paulet St John =

Paulet St John may refer to:

- Paulet St John, 3rd Earl of Bolingbroke (1634 – 1711), English politician
- Paulet St John, 8th Baron St John of Bletso (died 1714), English peer
- Sir Paulet St John, 1st Baronet (1704–1780), English Member of Parliament for Hampshire and Winchester
