= Beauchamp St John =

English politician (1594–1667)

Member of Parliament for Bedfordshire
- In office 1621; 1626; 1628 - 1629; April 1640 - 1643

Personal details
- Born: 17 March 1594
- Died: 1667 (aged 72–73)
- Spouse: Rebecca Hawkins (m. 1613)
- Children: 2
- Parent: Oliver St John (father)
- Relatives: Rowland St John (brother); Anthony St John (brother); Alexander St John (brother); Oliver St John (brother); Henry St John (brother); Oliver St John (grandfather)
- Education: Queens' College, Cambridge

Sir Beauchamp St John (17 March 1594 – 1667) was an English politician who sat in the House of Commons variously between 1621 and 1653. He supported the Parliamentary side in the English Civil War.

== Biography ==
St John was a son of Oliver St John, 3rd Baron St John of Bletso and his wife Dorothy Reid, daughter of Sir John Rede or Reid, of Odington, Gloucestershire. He was admitted fellow commoner at Queens' College, Cambridge on 9 March 1609/10, and was conferred an MA in 1612/3, on the occasion of the King's visit. On 5 May 1613, he was admitted to Lincoln's Inn. He was knighted on 24 July 1619 at Bletsoe together with his brother Henry, later an MP. Apart from Henry, four other brothers, Oliver, Rowland, Anthony and Alexander were all to become MPs.

In 1621 St John was elected Member of Parliament for Bedfordshire. He was elected MP for Bedford in 1626 and again in 1628. He sat until 1629 when King Charles decided to rule without parliament for eleven years. In 1625 he inherited through his wife the manor of Tilbrook.

In April 1640, St John was elected MP for Bedford in the Short Parliament. He was re-elected for Bedford for the Long Parliament in November 1640, where he was active at least in 1643 and remained in support of the parliamentary cause.

St John on 13 October 1613 married Rebecca Hawkins the daughter of William Hawkins of Tilbrook. They had a son, who died young, and a daughter.

His elder brother Oliver inherited the Barony and became Earl of Bolingbroke.

Parliament of England
| Preceded by Sir Oliver Luke; Henry Grey | Member of Parliament for Bedfordshire; 1621–1622; With: Sir Oliver Luke | Succeeded by Sir Oliver Luke; Sir Oliver St John |
| Preceded by Sir Alexander St John; Richard Taylor | Member of Parliament for Bedford; 1626–1629; With: Richard Taylor | Parliament suspended until 1640 |
| Vacant Parliament suspended since 1629 | Member of Parliament for Bedford; 1640–1653; With: Sir Samuel Luke | Not represented in Rump Parliament |
