= John Goldsborough (MP) =

English politician

Member of the England Parliament for Huntingdon
- In office 1626–1626 Serving with Sir Arthur Mainwaring
- Preceded by: Sir Henry St John; Sir Arthur Mainwaring
- Succeeded by: James Montagu; Oliver Cromwell

Personal details
- Born: c. 1597
- Died: 23 March 1640 Godmanchester

John Goldsborough (c.1597 – 23 March 1640) was an English politician who represented the constituency of Huntingdon from 1626 to 1626.
