= John St John, 2nd Baron St John of Bletso =

16th-century English peer

Member of Parliament for Bedfordshire
- In office 1563–1567

Personal details
- Died: 23 October 1596
- Spouse: Katherine Dormer
- Children: 1+, including Anne
- Parent: Oliver St John (father)
- Relatives: Oliver St John (brother); Oliver St John (nephew); Rowland St John (nephew); Anthony St John (nephew); Alexander St John (nephew); Beauchamp St John (nephew); Henry St John (nephew); John St John (grandfather)

John St John, 2nd Baron St John of Bletso (died 23 October 1596) was an English peer. The son of Oliver St John, 1st Baron St John of Bletso, and Agnes Fisher, he succeeded to the barony upon his father's death in 1582.

John St John was M.P. for Bedfordshire from 1563 to 1567. In January 1585 he was appointed the keeper of Mary, Queen of Scots, at Tutbury Castle. John was reluctant to accept the commission and argued at length with Lord Burghley before accepting, but in 1586 was one of the peers who judged her guilty. He was Lord Lieutenant of Huntingdonshire from about 1587 until his death.

St John married, about 1575, Katherine Dormer, daughter of Dorothy (born Catesby) and Sir William Dormer of Wing, Buckinghamshire and died on 23 October 1596 without male heirs. He was buried at Bletsoe. He was succeeded by his younger brother. His daughter Anne married William Howard, 3rd Baron Howard of Effingham. His widow died in 1615 and was buried in Westminster Abbey.

Parliament of England
Preceded by Sir Humphrey Radclyffe; Sir John Gascoyne	Member of Parliament for Bedfordshire; 1559–1567; With: Thomas Pigott 1559; Lewis Mordaunt 1563–1567	Succeeded by George Rotherham; Thomas Snagge
Political offices
Preceded by The Lord St John of Bletso	Custos Rotulorum of Bedfordshire; 1582–1596	Succeeded by The Lord St John of Bletso
Preceded by Unknown	Lord Lieutenant of Huntingdonshire; 1588–1596	Succeeded by The Lord St John of Bletso
Peerage of England
Preceded by Oliver St John	Baron St John of Bletso; 1582–1596	Succeeded by Oliver St John
