= Alexander St John =

English politician (d. 1657)

Member of Parliament for Barnstaple
- In office 1626–1629

Member of Parliament for Bedford
- In office 1614–1624

Personal details
- Died: June 1657
- Spouse: Margaret Draynor (d. 1656)
- Parent: Oliver St John (father)
- Relatives: Rowland St John (brother); Oliver St John (brother); Anthony St John (brother); Beauchamp St John (brother); Henry St John (brother); Oliver St John (grandfather)
- Education: Queens' College, Cambridge

Sir Alexander St John (died June 1657) was an English politician who sat in the House of Commons variously between 1621 and 1629.

== Biography ==
St John was a son of Oliver St John, 3rd Baron St John of Bletso and his wife Dorothy Reid, daughter of Sir John Rede or Reid, of Odington, Gloucestershire. He was admitted fellow commoner at Queens' College, Cambridge on 9 November 1601. He was knighted on 5 August 1608 at Bletsoe together with his brother Anthony. Apart from Anthony, four other brothers, Oliver, Rowland, Beauchamp and Henry were to become MPs.

In 1614 St John was elected Member of Parliament for Bedford and was re-elected in 1621 and 1624. In 1626 and 1628 he was elected MP for Barnstaple. He sat until 1629 when King Charles decided to rule without parliament for eleven years.

St John married Margaret Draynor, the widow of Thomas Draynor and daughter of John Trye, of Hardwick, Gloucestershire. He survived her death in 1656 and caused a white marble monument, adorned with pilasters, entablature, pediment, and two Cupids, to be erected in her memory in the church of St Leonards, Shoreditch. He left no children.

His eldest brother Oliver inherited the Barony and became Earl of Bolingbroke.

Parliament of England
Preceded by Thomas Hawes; Sir Christopher Hatton	Member of Parliament for Bedford; 1614–1624; With: Richard Taylor 1621–1624	Succeeded by Richard Taylor; Sir Beauchamp St John
Preceded by Pentecost Dodderidge; John Delbridge	Member of Parliament for Barnstaple; 1626–1629; With: John Delbridge	Parliament suspended until 1640
