= Anthony St John =

English politician

The Honourable Sir Anthony St John
- Arms of the Hon. Sir Anthony St John

Member of Parliament for Wigan
- In office 1624; 1626; 1628

Member of Parliament for Cheshire
- In office 1625

Personal details
- Born: 1586
- Died: 1649 (aged 62–63)
- Spouse(s): Katherine, Lady Herbert (née Awbrey) (m. 1610) Thomasin Dutton (née Anderton) (m. 1618)
- Children: 2
- Parent: Oliver, 3rd Baron St John of Bletso (father)
- Relatives: Oliver, 1st Baron St John of Bletso (grandfather); Oliver St John, 1st Earl of Bolingbroke (brother); Sir Alexander St John (brother); Sir Rowland St John (brother); Sir Henry St John (brother); Sir Beauchamp St John (brother); Sir John Booth (son-in-law)
- Education: Queens' College, Cambridge
- Military career
- Allegiance: Parliamentarian
- Rank: Captain
- Unit: Earl of Essex's Regiment of Foot
- Conflicts: English Civil War

Sir Anthony St John (1586–1649) was an English Member of Parliament (MP) who sat in the House of Commons in 1624 and 1625.

St John supported the Parliamentarian cause in the English Civil War.

== Biography ==
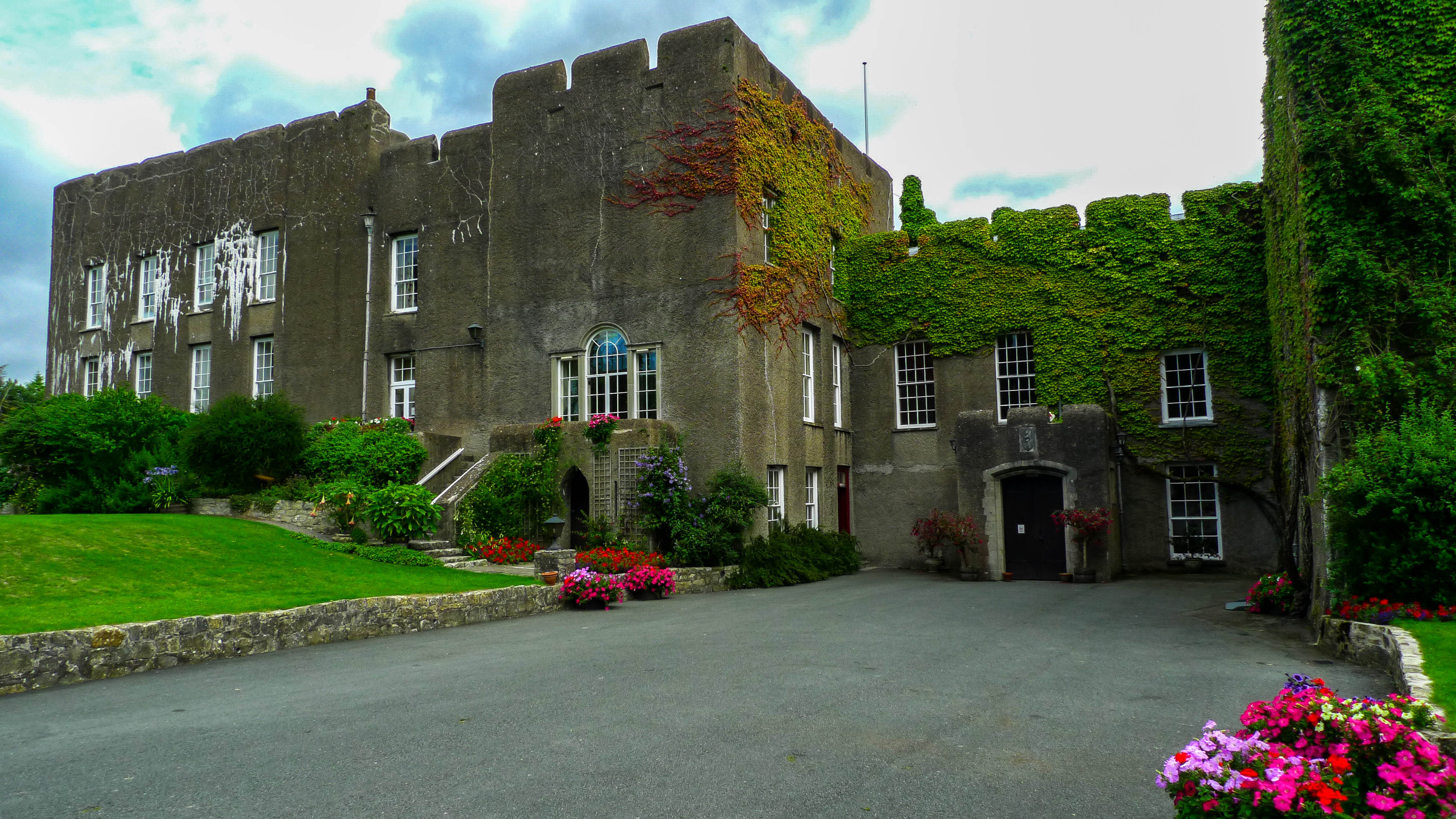
Fonmon Castle, Vale of Glamorgan

The second son of Oliver St John, 3rd Baron St John of Bletso and his wife Dorothy Read, daughter and co-heiress of Sir John Read, of Boddington, Gloucestershire, he was admitted a fellow commoner at Queens' College, Cambridge on 9 November 1601.

Knighted on 5 August 1608, aged 21, at Bletsoe together with his younger brother Alexander, all his brothers, Oliver, Rowland, Henry and Beauchamp, became MPs and also received knighthoods.

In 1624 Sir Anthony was elected as Member of Parliament for Wigan, and in 1625 as MP for Cheshire, being returned to parliament for Wigan, Lancashire again in 1626 and 1628.

Commissioned into the Earl of Essex's Regiment of Foot as a Captain in 1642, St John supported the Parliamentary side during the Civil War.

== Family ==
On 24 April 1610 at St Andrew Holborn in the City of London, Sir Anthony married firstly Katherine, Lady Herbert (died 1617) widow of Sir William Herbert and a daughter of Alderman Morgan Awbrey, Master Salter of London, having by her a son Oliver St John (who died aged 8) and Dorothy (died 1655), who married Colonel Sir John Booth.

St John married secondly, in 1618, Thomasin née Anderton, widow of Thomas Dutton (died 1614), of Dutton, Cheshire. Sir Anthony and Lady St John divided their time between homes in Cheshire and London, as well as the family seat at Fonmon Castle in the Vale of Glamorgan which was falling into a state of disrepair. Upon his daughter's death, the Fonmon estate was sold in 1655 to Colonel Philip Jones.

His elder brother Oliver succeeded to the family title of Baron St John in 1618, and was created Earl of Bolingbroke in 1624.

== See also ==
- Fonmon Castle

Parliament of England
Preceded by Sir Thomas Gerard, Bt; Roger Downes	Member of Parliament for Wigan; 1624; With: Francis Downes	Succeeded by Francis Downes; Edward Bridgeman
Preceded by William Booth; William Brereton	Member of Parliament for Cheshire; 1625; With: Sir Robert Cholmondeley, Bt	Succeeded by Sir Richard Grosvenor, Bt; Sir Peter Daniell
