= Arthur Mainwaring (disambiguation) =

Arthur Mainwaring may refer to:

- Sir Arthur Mainwaring (died 1590), MP for Shropshire (UK Parliament constituency)
- Sir Arthur Mainwaring (died 1648), MP for Huntingdon
- Arthur Maynwaring or Mainwaring (1668–1712), MP for Preston and West Looe
