= Oliver St John, 5th Baron St John of Bletso =

English politician

Member of Parliament for Bedfordshire
- In office 1624–1629

Personal details
- Born: 1603
- Died: 23 October 1642 (aged 38–39) Warwickshire, England
- Spouse: Arabella Egerton (m. 1623)
- Children: 4
- Parent: Oliver St John (father)
- Relatives: Oliver St John (grandfather); Oliver St John (nephew); Paulet St John (nephew); Rowland St John (uncle); Anthony St John (uncle); Alexander St John (uncle); Beauchamp St John (uncle); Henry St John (uncle)
- Education: Queens' College, Cambridge
- Military career
- Allegiance: Parliamentarians
- Conflicts: English Civil War

Oliver St John, 5th Baron St John of Bletso KB (1603 – 23 October 1642) was an English politician who sat in the House of Commons from 1624 to 1629 and in the House of Lords from 1639. He died fighting in the Parliamentary army in the English Civil War.

== Education and family ==
St John was the son of Oliver St John, 1st Earl of Bolingbroke and his wife Elizabeth Paulet, daughter of William Paulet. He was baptised on 2 April 1603. St John was admitted a fellow commoner of Queens' College, Cambridge on 3 November 1615, and was presumably the Oliver St John granted a passport to travel to Europe in June 1617. He matriculated at Queens' in 1618 and was awarded an MA in 1620.

In 1623, St John married Arabella Egerton, daughter of John Egerton, 1st Earl of Bridgewater, by whom he had four daughters:

- 1. Frances St John married Sir William Beecher of Howberry.
- 2. Elizabeth St John married George Bennett of Cotsback
- 3. Arabella St John married Sir Edward Wyse of Sydenham
- 4. Dorothy St John married Francis Charlton of Apley Castle, Shropshire.

== In the Commons ==
In February 1624, his father arranged his return to Parliament as knight of the shire for Bedfordshire, replacing Oliver's uncle Sir Beauchamp St John. St John's father owned large estates there and dominated the representation of the county; Oliver was returned alongside his father's first cousin, Sir Oliver Luke, who was likewise supported by the family interest.

On 27 April, St John certified to the House that there were no recusants holding office in his county, but does not otherwise appear in Parliamentary records. After his father was created Earl of Bolingbroke on 28 December, St John adopted the courtesy title of Lord St John of Bletsoe. Re-elected for Bedfordshire in 1625, he was more active in that Parliament, serving on several legislative committees. He was appointed a justice of the peace for Bedford, Bedfordshire, and Hertfordshire that year.

St John was again returned for Bedfordshire in January 1626, to the 2nd Parliament of King Charles I. On 1 February 1626, he was created a Knight of the Bath at Charles' coronation, shortly before Parliament assembled. In that Parliament, he was appointed to the Committee of Privileges, and also to the committee that punished Sir Thomas Hartopp, High Sheriff of Leicestershire, for interfering in his county's election. However, his Parliamentary activity centered on committees dealing with various aspects of the war with Spain, and he was an open critic of the Duke of Buckingham's conduct. That Parliament was dissolved on 15 June after framing a remonstrance against Buckingham, being unwilling to grant a supply to the King until the Duke was removed. Immediately after the dissolution, St John and others possessing copies of the remonstrance were ordered to surrender them for destruction, by Royal command, although a copy survives in his family's papers; and through the agency of the Duke, Luke and the St Johns were removed from the commissions of the peace.

In the interval between Parliaments, St John was admitted at Lincoln's Inn on 9 August 1627. He was returned to the House of Commons for the last time in February 1628, to the 3rd parliament of King Charles I. Surprisingly, despite the ongoing struggle between his family and the King (Sir Oliver Luke, Sir Beauchamp St John, and Bolingbroke had all refused to pay the forced loan of the previous year), St John had only a minor role in the assembly of the Petition of Right. He was again appointed to the committee of privileges, but engaged in little other Parliamentary business. He and his relatives were re-appointed to their commissions of the peace in December 1628, shortly after the murder of Buckingham. His inactivity in Parliament during 1629 may have reciprocated this pacific gesture, but continued to adhere to the popular party in the Commons, and applied for a license to visit the Parliamentary leader Sir John Eliot in the Tower of London, where Eliot was imprisoned after the dissolution of Parliament.

== Debts and death ==
During the 1630s, he took part in his father's efforts to drain the Great Level, serving as a commissioner of sewers there from 1631 to 1636 or later, but was largely occupied in dealing with his own accumulation of debts.

The lord St. John...got himself well beloved by the reputation of courtesy and civility which he expressed towards all men, that, though his parts of understanding were very ordinary at best, and his course of life licentious and very much depraved, he got credit enough, by engaging the principal gentlemen of Bedfordshire and Hartfordshire to be bound for him, to contract a debt of fifty or threescore thousand pounds; for the payment whereof the fortune of the family was not engaged, nor in his power to engage...he left the kingdom, and fled into France; leaving his vast debt to be paid by his sureties, to the utter ruin of many families, and the notable impairment of others.

— Clarendon, History of the Rebellion

The figure of £60,000 for his debts was given in a petition to the House of Commons in 1641; an enormous sum, if truthfully reported, for an heir apparent with a negligible estate of his own to offer as security. Two earlier petitions recited liabilities on his part of £6,900, still very significant, and he was also prosecuted as a surety for the debts of Sir Thomas Cheney, his uncle by marriage. As Clarendon avers, his debts did cause havoc for his sureties: some of the possessions of his uncle Sir Alexander St John were distrained by Lord St John's creditors, and Sir Capell Bedell, another surety, made a composition with Lord Bolingbroke to pay some of the debts to avoid the same fate.

On 21 November 1638, he obtained a passport to travel for three years under the alias of "St John Thompson", but the deception was discovered, and he was arrested under a warrant from Sir Francis Windebank on 21 December while lying ill at Rye. However, he was released or allowed to proceed, and spent the next two years in exile on the continent. From abroad, he petitioned for immunity from prosecution for debt, which was effectively granted when he was summoned to the House of Lords by writ of acceleration as Baron St John of Bletso, entering the House on 14 May 1641. His writ was said by Clarendon to have been granted with the object of composing his debts and reducing the turmoil among his sureties in Bedfordshire, and obtaining an adherent of the Royal party in the Lords; but St John showed no attachment to the King's cause. Indeed, he seems to have been largely preoccupied in defending himself from his creditors.

When the English Civil War broke out, he raised, presumably on his father's credit, a troop of horse and a regiment of foot for Parliament, in which Oliver Cromwell's eldest son, Oliver, served as cornet. Early in October 1642 he occupied Hereford on behalf of Parliament, fortified the town, and refused admittance to King Charles when he appeared there on 8 October. He then joined the army of the Earl of Essex. He was wounded at the Battle of Edgehill on 23 October 1642, captured by the Royalists, and according to Clarendon, died the next morning.

Parliament of England
Preceded by Sir Beauchamp St John; Sir Oliver Luke	Member of Parliament for Bedfordshire; 1624–1629; With: Sir Oliver Luke	Parliament suspended until 1640
Peerage of England
Preceded by Oliver St John	Baron St John of Bletso (writ in acceleration); 1641–1642	Succeeded by Oliver St John
