= Oliver Luke =

English politician

Member of Parliament for Bedfordshire
- In office 1614–1629; 1640-1648

High Sheriff of Bedfordshire
- In office 1617–1618

Personal details
- Born: 1574 Cople, Bedfordshire, England
- Died: c. 1651 (aged 76–77)
- Spouse(s): Elizabeth Knightley (m. 1599) Maud Trenchard
- Children: 4+, including Samuel
- Education: King's College, Cambridge

Sir Oliver Luke (1574–c.1651) of Woodend, Cople and Hawnes, Bedfordshire was an English politician who sat in the House of Commons of England from 1614 to 1648.

== Biography ==
Luke was born at Cople, Bedfordshire, the son of Sir Nicholas Luke and his wife Margaret St John. He was educated at King's College, Cambridge and entered the Middle Temple in 1592 to study law. He was knighted in 1603 and succeeded his father in 1613.

In 1614, Luke was elected Member of Parliament for Bedfordshire in the Addled Parliament. He was High Sheriff of Bedfordshire in 1617. He was elected for succeeding parliaments until King Charles dispensed with parliament in 1629. He was subsequently elected for the Short Parliament in April 1640 and for the Long Parliament in November 1640. He remained a supporter of the parliamentary forces but was excluded under Pride's Purge in 1648.

Luke probably died around the age of 76 after he was excluded from the Long Parliament.

He had married Elizabeth Knightley, daughter of Sir Valentine Knightley and Anne Unton on 17 August 1599. He remarried by 1616, Maud, the daughter of William Trenchard of ‘Cutheridge’, Wiltshire. He had at least 3 sons and a daughter. His son Samuel Luke was also an MP.

Parliament of England
Preceded by Hon. Oliver St John; Sir Edward Radclyffe	Member of Parliament for Bedfordshire; 1614–1629; With: Sir Henry Grey 1614; Sir Beauchamp St John 1621–1622; Oliver St John 1624–1629	Parliament suspended until 1640
Vacant Parliament suspended since 1629	Member of Parliament for Bedfordshire; 1640–1648; With: The Lord Wentworth 1640; Roger Burgoyne 1641–1648	Succeeded by Nathaniel Taylor; Edward Cater
Political offices
Preceded by Roger Burgoyne	High Sheriff of Bedfordshire; 1617–1618	Succeeded by Sir Edmund Conquest
