= Richard Taylor (died 1641) =

Richard Taylor (died 1641) was an English lawyer and politician who sat in the House of Commons from 1621 to 1629.

Taylor was the son of Thomas Taylor of Grimesbury-in-Bolnhurst, Bedfordshire. He matriculated from Christ's College, Cambridge in 1597 and was awarded BA in 1600. He was admitted at Lincoln's Inn on 24 May 1600 and was called to the bar in 1607. He became deputy recorder of Bedford.

In 1621 Taylor was elected Member of Parliament for Bedford. He became a Bencher of his Inn in 1623. In 1624 he was re-elected MP for Bedford. He was elected MP for Bedford again in 1625 and 1626. He was Autumn Reader for Lincoln's Inn from 1626 to 1627. He was granted arms and purchased the estate of Clapham, Bedfordshire in 1627. In 1628 he was re-elected MP for Bedford and sat until 1629 when King Charles decided to rule without parliament for eleven years. He became Serjeant-at-law and a J.P. for Bedfordshire and was a supporter of the prerogative.

Taylor died in 1641.

Taylor married Elizabeth Boteler, daughter of William Boteler of Biddenham, Bedfordshire, on 12 August 1613. His son Richard was also MP for Bedford. His third son William fought for the king in the Civil War and was captured near Chester. His daughter Katherine married William second Lord Ashburnham.

Parliament of England
Preceded by Alexander St John; John Leigh	Member of Parliament for Bedford; 1621–1629; With: Sir Alexander St John 1621–1625; Beauchamp St John 1626–1629	Parliament suspended until 1640
