= Henry St John (MP for Huntingdon) =

English politician

Member of Parliament for Huntingdon
- In office 1621; 1625-1625

Personal details
- Born: 1590
- Died: c. 1642 (aged 51–52)
- Parent: Oliver St John (father)
- Relatives: Alexander St John (brother); Oliver St John (brother); Anthony St John (brother); Beauchamp St John (brother); Rowland St John (brother); Oliver St John (grandfather)

Sir Henry St John (1590-c.1642) was an English politician who sat in the House of Commons between 1621 and 1625.

== Biography ==
St John was a younger son of Oliver St John, 3rd Baron St John of Bletso and his wife Dorothy Reid, daughter of Sir John Rede or Reid, of Odington, Gloucestershire. He was knighted on 24 July 1619 at Bletsoe together with his brother Beauchamp, MP. Apart from Beauchamp, four other brothers, Oliver, Rowland, Anthony and Alexander were to become MPs.

In 1621 St John was elected member of parliament for Huntingdon. He was re-elected MP for Huntingdon in 1624 and again in 1625.

St John died without issue. His eldest brother Oliver inherited the Barony and became Earl of Bolingbroke.

Parliament of England
Preceded by Sir Christopher Hatton; Sir Miles Fleetwood	Member of Parliament for Huntingdon; 1621–1622; With: Sir Miles Sandys, Bt 1621–1622; Sir Arthur Mainwaring 1624–1625	Succeeded by Sir Arthur Mainwaring; John Goldsborough
