= Thomas Pigott (Bedfordshire MP) =

16th-century English politician

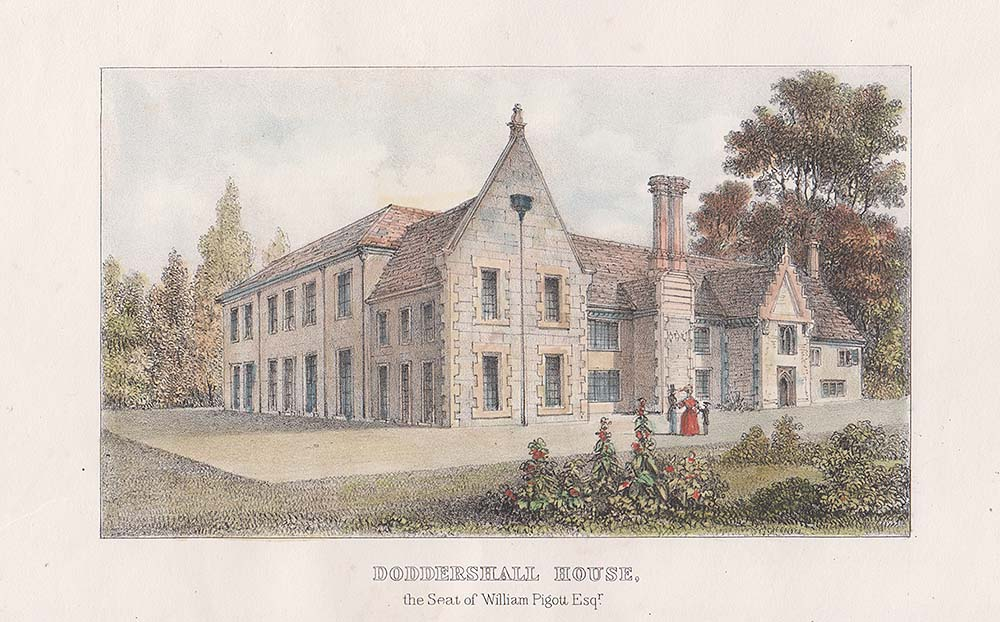
Doddershall House, Pigott family estate

Thomas Pigott (c. 1526 – 1579) was an English politician.

== Career ==
Thomas Pigott of Doddershall was born to Francis Pigott, son of Thomas Pigott (b. 1478) and Agnes Forster. Through his grandfather, he was half-cousin to MP Thomas Pigott (Aylesbury MP), grandson of Lady Maud Parr.

Pigott became High Sheriff of Buckinghamshire in 1552–3, and in 1557-8, and a Member (MP) of the Parliament of England for Bedfordshire in 1559.

He married to Anne Rich, daughter of Sir Richard Rich, 1st Baron Rich, Lord Chancellor of England.

Parliament of England
| Preceded by Sir Humphrey Radclyffe; Sir John Gascoigne | Member of Parliament for Bedfordshire; 1559; With: John St John | Succeeded by John St John; Lewis Mordaunt |
Political offices
| Preceded by Oliver St John | High Sheriff of Bedfordshire and Buckinghamshire; 1552–1553 | Succeeded by Sir William Dormer |
| Preceded by Sir Robert Peckham | High Sheriff of Bedfordshire and Buckinghamshire; 1557–1558 | Succeeded by Sir Humphrey Ratcliffe |
| Preceded by Sir Lewis Mordaunt | High Sheriff of Bedfordshire and Buckinghamshire; 1571 | Succeeded by Thomas Leigh |
