= John St. John (MP for Bletchingley) =

16th-century English politician

Sir John St. John (c. 1505 – 5 April 1576), of Lydiard Tregoz, Wiltshire, Farley Chamberlayne near Braishfield in Hampshire and Ewell, Surrey, was an English politician.

He was a Member (MP) of the Parliament of England for Bletchingley in 1529.
