= Paulet St John, 8th Baron St John of Bletso =

English aristocrat and peer

- St John coat of arms.
- Born: 1711
- Died: 1714 (aged 3)
- Relatives: John St John (nephew)

Paulet St Andrew St John, 8th Baron St John of Bletso and 5th Baronet (1711–1714) was an 18th-century English aristocrat who succeeded as a peer, and as a baronet, but died in infancy.

Sir St Andrew St John, 4th Baronet, his father, was heir presumptive to his second cousin, Paulet St John, 3rd Earl of Bolingbroke, both of whom died in 1711; Paulet St John was born posthumously and so succeeded at birth to the family's ancient barony (but not the more recently created earldom, to which he was not in remainder) as well as to his father's baronetcy. He died an infant at the age of three, being succeeded as 9th Baron by his uncle, William St John.

== St John family ==
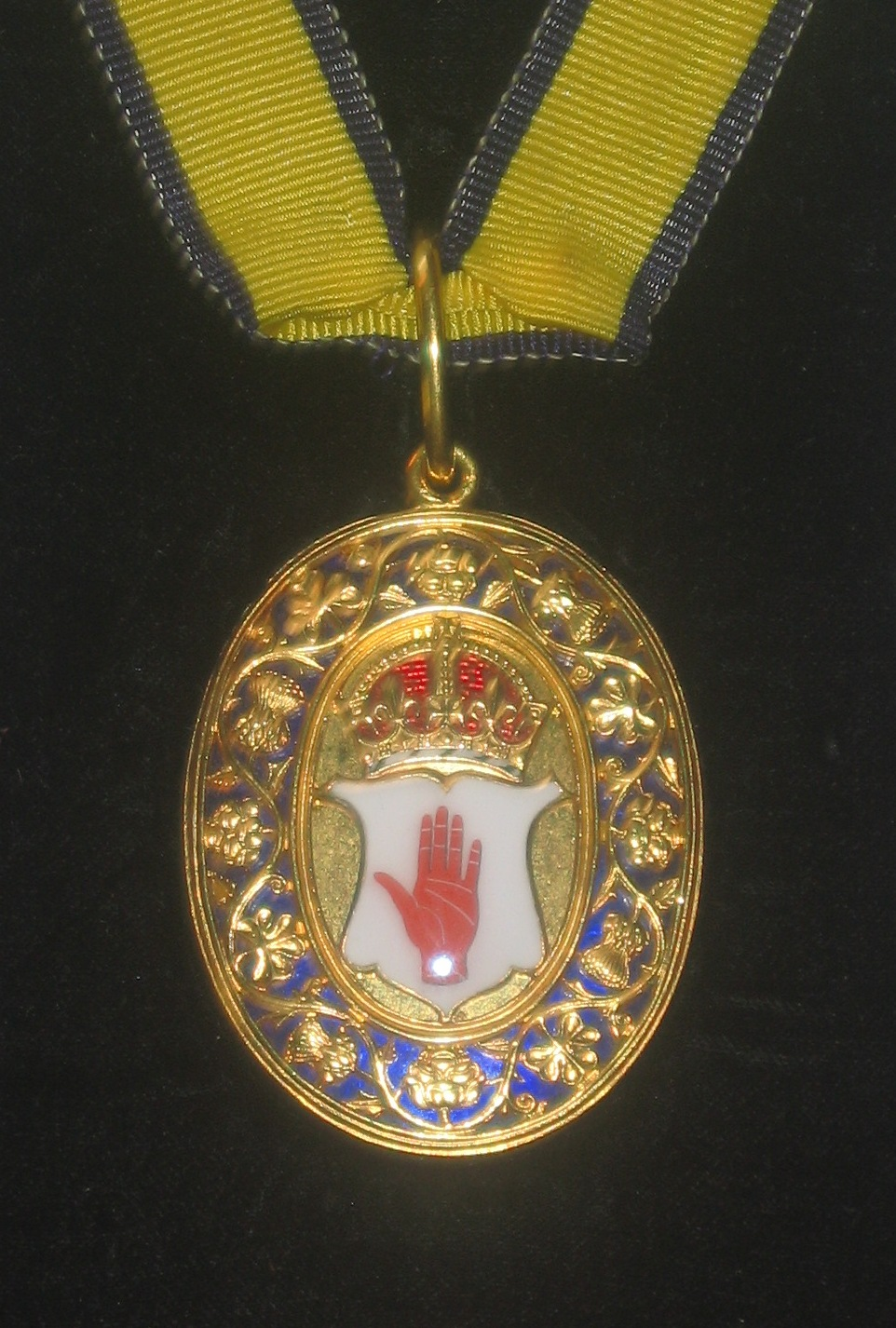
Insignia of a Baronet

Such quick succession in the family titles created confusion and so sources differ in the numbering of the subsequent Barons St John:

The fourth Baron St John was created Earl of Bolingbroke; when the Long Parliament was called, both the aged Earl and his eldest son were summoned, the latter by a writ of acceleration of the now-subsidiary title of Baron St John of Bletso. Normally, writs of acceleration end in the reunion of titles when the father dies; but in this case the son (Oliver St John, 5th Baron St John of Bletso) died two years later, fighting for the Parliamentarians at the Battle of Edgehill, and his father died in 1646, and was succeeded by his second son's son.

Whilst there is no question that Oliver St John succeeded as Baron St John of Bletso – he spoke and voted as a Peer in the House of Lords – the numbering of the successive Barons St John has been obfuscated by differing sources. Although publications such as Debrett's Peerage and the Complete Peerage record Oliver St John as one of these Barons St John, the family prefers not to, down to the present Baron St John, by ignoring the writ of acceleration granted to Oliver St John (died 23 October 1642); however, the register of the House of Lords now records Paulet St John, 7th Baron St John as the 3rd Earl of Bolingbroke.

== See also ==
- Baron St John of Bletso
- St John baronets

Peerage of England
Preceded by Paulet St John	Baron St John of Bletso; 1711–1714	Succeeded by William St John
Baronetage of England
Preceded by St Andrew St John	Baronet (of Woodford); 1711–1714	Succeeded by William St John
