= Baron St John of Bletso =

Title in the Peerage of England

- Arms of St John: Argent, on a chief gules two mullets or
- Creation: 1582
- Created by: King Charles I
- Peerage: Peerage of England
- First holder: Oliver St John
- Present holder: Anthony Tudor St John
- Heir apparent: Oliver Beauchamp St John
- Status: Extant

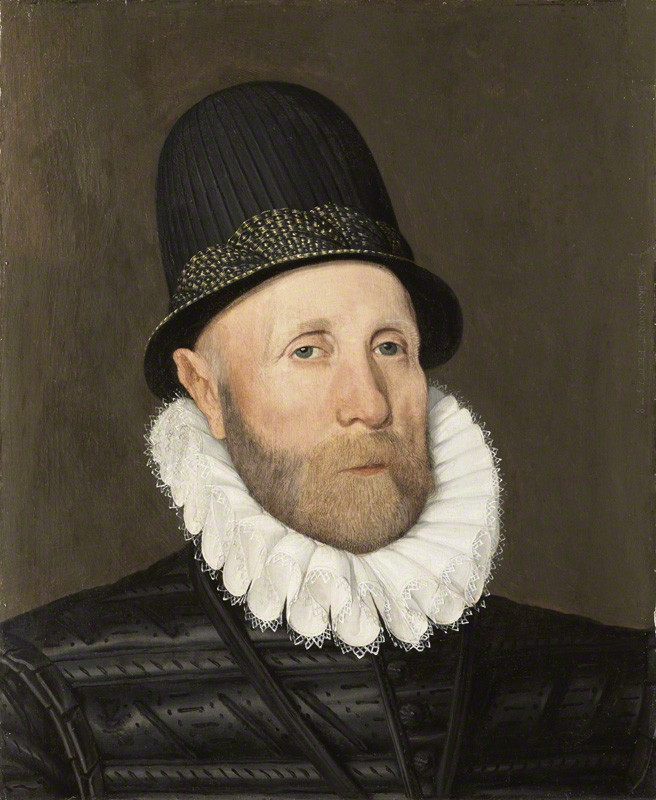
Oliver St John, 1st Baron St John of Bletso, by Arnold Bronckorst, 1578

Baron St John of Bletso, in the County of Bedford, is a title in the Peerage of England. It was created in 1582 for Oliver St John.

For a period, the title Baron St John was subsumed within the title Earl of Bolingbroke which was granted to the fourth Baron. The Earldom died out with the third Earl, but the Barony continued via another branch which had since become the baronet line. The eldest son of the 1st Earl was advanced to the barony by Writ of acceleration under King Charles I to become the 5th Baron. However he died in the civil war without becoming Earl, This resulted in the existence of an additional baron in the sequence but this was not taken into account by the family when the barony was continued.

Hence there is a discrepancy between the complete numbered series used by Burke and Debrett, and the numbering series in use by the family, particularly in the 18th and 19th century. Hence the numbers on family graves of this time are one less than the numbers used in the principal peerage registers that form the basis for this article.

== History ==
According to Horace Round (1901) the St John family of Bletso are descended from the St Johns of Fonmon Castle in Glamorgan, Wales. Again according to Round, this was possibly a cadet branch of St John of Basing, Hampshire, and Halnaker, Sussex, which family descended in the male line from the Norman Hugh de Port (d.1091) lord of the manor of Port-en-Bessin in Normandy who took part in the Norman Conquest of England in 1066, and was subsequently granted 53 manors in Hampshire. However according to Brownhill (1931) the male ancestry of St John of Bletso cannot be traced further back than Alexander de St John (fl.1340) of Instow in Devon.

Oliver St John, the 1st Baron was the great-great-grandson of Sir John St John (died c. 1482), eldest son of Sir John Oliver St John of Bletso (died 1437), the husband of Margaret, great-great-granddaughter of Roger de Beauchamp (died 1380), who was summoned to Parliament as Baron Beauchamp of Bletso from 1363 to 1379. Since then that title had not been assumed although Oliver St John was considered to be the line of heir. He was succeeded by his son, the second Baron. He was one of the peers who sat during the trial of Mary, Queen of Scots. He died without male heirs and the claim to the barony of Beauchamp of Bletsoe passed to his daughter Anne, the wife of William Howard, Lord Howard Effingham, eldest son and heir of Charles Howard, 1st Earl of Nottingham.

He was succeeded in the barony of St John of Bletsoe by his younger brother, the third Baron. The latter's son, the fourth Baron, was created Earl of Bolingbroke in 1624. His eldest son and heir apparent, Oliver St John, was in 1641 summoned to the House of Lords through a writ of acceleration in his father's junior title of Baron St John of Bletsoe. However, he predeceased his father (killed at the Battle of Edgehill in 1642) but due to the writ of acceleration issued he is known as the fifth Baron St John of Bletsoe. The Earl was succeeded by his grandson, the second Earl. He was the son of Sir Paulet St John, younger son of the first Earl. He died childless and was succeeded by his younger brother, the third Earl, who represented Bedford in the House of Commons. He never married and on his death in 1711 the earldom became extinct.

The barony was inherited by his second cousin once removed, Sir Paulet St Andrew St John, 5th Baronet, who became the eighth Baron. He was the great-great-grandson of the Hon. Sir Rowland St John, fourth son of the third Baron (see below for more information on the baronetcy). His cousin's son, the fourteenth Baron, sat as a Member of Parliament for Bedfordshire. His grandson, the seventeenth Baron, served as Lord Lieutenant of Bedfordshire from 1905 to 1912. As of 2010 the titles are held by the latter's great-grandson, the twenty-second Baron, who succeeded his father in 1978. He is one of the ninety elected hereditary peers that remain in the House of Lords after the passing of the House of Lords Act 1999, and sits as a cross-bencher.

The St John Baronetcy, of Woodford in the County of Northampton, was created in the Baronetage of England in 1660 for Oliver St John. He was the son of the Hon. Sir Rowland St John, fourth son of the third Baron St John of Bletsoe. His son, the second Baronet, represented Northamptonshire in the House of Commons. The latter's grandson, the fifth Baronet, succeeded as eighth Baron St John of Bletsoe in 1711 (see above for later history of the titles).

Oliver St John (died c. 1497), younger brother of the aforementioned Sir John St John (died c. 1482), was the ancestor of the Viscounts Grandison and the Viscounts Bolingbroke and St John.

== Barons St John of Bletso (1559) ==
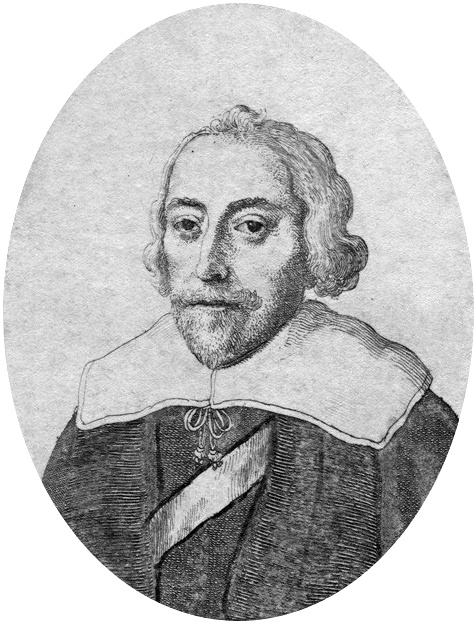
Oliver St John, 1st Earl of Bolingbroke.

- Oliver St John, 1st Baron St John of Bletso (died 1582)
- John St John, 2nd Baron St John of Bletso (died 1596)
- Oliver St John, 3rd Baron St John of Bletso (c. 1540–1618)
- Oliver St John, 4th Baron St John of Bletso (died 1646) (created Earl of Bolingbroke in 1624)

== Earls of Bolingbroke (1624) ==
- Oliver St John, 1st Earl of Bolingbroke, 4th Baron St John of Bletso (c. 1580–1646)
  - Oliver St John, 5th Baron St John of Bletso (1603–1642) (by writ of acceleration)
- Oliver St John, 2nd Earl of Bolingbroke, 6th Baron St John of Bletso (before 1634–1688)
- Paulet St John, 3rd Earl of Bolingbroke, 7th Baron St John of Bletso (1634–1711)

== Barons St John of Bletso (1559; reverted) ==
Note: some sources do not count the 5th baron above as of this creation, as Debrett's and the Complete Peerage do. He was summoned to Parliament in his father's lifetime in the lesser title, but did not survive to inherit from him. In such sources the barons are numbered one less.

- Paulet St Andrew St John, 8th Baron St John of Bletso, 5th Baronet St John of Woodford (d. 1714)
- William St John, 9th Baron St John of Bletso, 6th Baronet St John of Woodson (d. 1720)
- Rowland St John, 10th Baron St John of Bletso, 7th Baronet St John of Woodson (d. 1722)
- John St John, 11th Baron St John of Bletso, 8th Baronet St John of Woodson (d. 1757)
- John St John, 12th Baron St John of Bletso, 9th Baronet St John of Woodson (1725–1767)
- Henry Beauchamp St John, 13th Baron St John of Bletso, 10th Baronet St John of Woodson (1758–1805)
- St Andrew St John, 14th Baron St John of Bletso, 11th Baronet St John of Woodson (1759–1817)
- St Andrew Beauchamp St John, 15th Baron St John of Bletso, 12th Baronet St John of Woodson (1811–1874)
- St Andrew St John, 16th Baron St John of Bletso, 13th Baronet St John of Woodson (1840–1887)
- Beauchamp Mowbray St John, 17th Baron St John of Bletso, 14th Baronet St John of Woodson (1844–1912)
- Henry Beauchamp Oliver St John, 18th Baron St John of Bletso, 15th Baronet St John of Woodson (1876–1920)
- Moubray St Andrew Thornton St John, 19th Baron St John of Bletso, 16th Baronet St John of Woodson (1877–1934)
- John Mowbray Russell St John, 20th Baron St John of Bletso, 17th Baronet St John of Woodson (1917–1976)
- Andrew Beauchamp St John, 21st Baron St John of Bletso, 18th Baronet St John of Woodson (1918–1978)
- Anthony Tudor St John, 22nd Baron St John of Bletso, 19th Baronet St John of Woodson (b. 1957)

The heir apparent is the present holder's son, Oliver Beauchamp St John (b. 1995).

== St John Baronets, of Woodford (1660) ==
- Sir Oliver St John, 1st Baronet (c. 1624–1662) (son of Rowland St John, fourth son of 3rd Baron above)
- Sir St Andrew St John, 2nd Baronet (1658–1709)
- Sir Oliver St John, 3rd Baronet (c. 1683–c. 1710)
- Sir St Andrew St John, 4th Baronet (c. 1685–1711; brother)
- Sir Paulet St Andrew St John, 5th Baronet (1711–1714) (posthumous son; succeeded at birth as Baronet and as Baron St John of Bletso)

see above for further holders

== Family tree ==
St John family tree: Earls of Bolingbroke and subsidiary and courtesy titles

Oliver St John d. 1437	Margaret Beauchamp c. 1410–before 1482	John Beaufort; 1404–1444; 1st Duke of Somerset
John St John d. c. 1482	Oliver St John d. c. 1497	Margaret Beaufort; 1443–1509; Countess of Richmond and Derby
John St John of Bletsoe c. 1450–after 1502	John St John	King Henry VII; 1457–1509
John St John; 1498–c. 1562	John St John; 1473–1512
Baron St John of Bletso, 1559
Oliver St John; 1516–1582; 1st Baron St John of Bletso	Nicholas St John d. 1589
Viscount Grandison of Limerick, 1620; Baron Tregoz of Highworth, 1626
John St John d. 1596; 2nd Baron St John of Bletso	Oliver St John c. 1540–1618; 3rd Baron St John of Bletso	John St. John c. 1552–1594	Oliver St. John; 1559–1630; 1st Viscount Grandison and Baron Tregoz of Highworth
Barony of Tregoz extinct, 1630
Earl of Bolingbroke, 1624	St John Baronet, of Lydiard Tregoze, 1611	See; Villiers family tree
Oliver St John c. 1580–1646; 1st Earl of Bolingbroke, 4th Baron St John of Bletso	Rowland St John; 1588–1645	John St John; 1585–1648; 1st Baronet St John of Lydiard Tregoze	Barbara St John	Edward Villiers c. 1585–1626
St John Baronet, of Woodford, 1660
Oliver St John; 1603–1642; 5th Baron St John of Bletso	Paulet St John d. 1638	Oliver St John c. 1624–1662; 1st Baronet St John of Woodford	Oliver St John; 1612/1613 – November 1641 or 1642	Walter St John; 1622–1708; 3rd Baronet St John of Lydiard Tregoze
Viscount St John and Baron St John of Battersea, 1716
Oliver St John before 1634–1688; 2nd Earl of Bolingbroke, 6th Baron St John of Bletso	Paulet St John; 1634–1711; 3rd Earl of Bolingbroke, 7th Baron St John of Bletso	St Andrew St John c. 1650–1709; 2nd Baronet St John of Woodford	John St John; 1638–1657; 2nd Baronet St John of Lydiard Tregoze	Henry St John baptized 1652–1742; 1st Viscount St John, etc., 4th Baronet St John of Lydiard Tregoze
Earldom of Bolingbroke extinct, 1711
Viscount Bolingbroke and Baron St John of Lydiard Tregoze, 1712
Oliver St John c. 1683–1710; 3rd Baronet St John of Woodford	St Andrew St John c. 1685–1711; 4th Baronet St John of Woodford	William St John d. 1720; 9th Baron St John of Bletso, 6th Baronet St John of Woodson	Rowland St John d. 1722; 10th Baron St John of Bletso, 7th Baronet St John of Woodson	John St John d. 1757; 11th Baron St John of Bletso, 8th Baronet St John of Woodson	Henry St John; 1678–1751; 1st Viscount Bolingbroke, etc.
Paulet St Andrew St John; 1711–1714; 8th Baron St John of Bletso, 5th Baronet St John of Woodford	John St Andrew St John; 1725–1767; 12th Baron St John of Bletso, 9th Baronet St John of Woodson	John St John; 1702–1748; 2nd Viscount St John, etc.
Frederick St John; 1732–1787; 3rd Viscount St John, etc., 2nd Viscount Bolingbroke, etc., 5th Baronet of Lydiard Tregoze
Henry Beauchamp St John; 1758–1805; 13th Baron St John of Bletso, 10th Baronet St John of Woodson	St Andrew St John; 1759–1817; 14th Baron St John of Bletso, 11th Baronet St John of Woodson	George Richard St John; 1761–1824; 4th Viscount St John, 3rd Viscount Bolingbroke, etc., 5th Baronet of Lydiard Tregoze	Ferdinand St. John; 1804–1865
St Andrew Beauchamp St John; 1811–1874; 15th Baron St John of Bletso, 12th Baronet St John of Woodson	Henry St John; 1786–1851; 5th Viscount St John, 4th Viscount Bolingbroke, etc., 6th Baronet of Lydiard Tregoze	Canon Maurice William Ferdinand St. John; 1827–1914
St Andrew St John; 1840–1887; 16th Baron St John of Bletso, 13th Baronet St John of Woodson	Beauchamp Moubray St John; 1844–1912; 17th Baron St John of Bletso, 14th Baronet St John of Woodson	Henry Mildmay St John; 1820–1899; 6th Viscount St John, 5th Viscount Bolingbroke, etc., 7th Baronet of Lydiard Tregoze	Henry Percy St John; 1854–1921••••
Henry Beauchamp Oliver St John; 1876–1920; 18th Baron St John of Bletso, 15th Baronet St John of Woodson	Moubray St Andrew Thornton St John; 1877–1934; 19th Baron St John of Bletso, 16th Baronet St John of Woodson	Rowland Tudor St John	Vernon Henry St John; 1896–1974; 7th Viscount St John, 6th Viscount Bolingbroke, etc., 8th Baronet of Lydiard Tregoze	Geoffrey Robert St. John; 1889–1972
John Moubray Russell St John; 1917–1976; 20th Baron St John of Bletso, 17th Baronet St John of Woodson	Andrew Beauchamp St John; 1918–1978; 21st Baron St John of Bletso, 18th Baronet St John of Woodson	Kenneth Oliver Musgrave St John; 1927–2010; 8th Viscount St John, 7th Viscount Bolingbroke, etc., 9th Baronet of Lydiard Tregoze
Anthony Tudor St John b. 1957; 22nd Baron St John of Bletso, 19th Baronet St John of Woodson	Henry FitzRoy St John; 1957–2011; 9th Viscount St John, 8th Viscount Bolingbroke, etc., and 8th Baron St John of Battersea, 10th Baronet of Lydiard Tregoze
Nicholas Alexander Mowbray St John b. 1974; 10th Viscount St John, 9th Viscount Bolingbroke, etc., 12th Baronet of Lydiard Tregoze
Oliver Beauchamp St John b. 1995

== See also ==
- Baron Beauchamp of Bletsoe
- Viscount Grandison
- Viscount Bolingbroke and St John
