= Arthur Mainwaring =

English politician

Sir Arthur Mainwaring (1582 – 1648) was an English politician who sat in the House of Commons from 1624 to 1626.

== Life ==
Mainwaring was born in November 1582 at Thorpe, near Newark, Nottinghamshire, the eldest son of Sir George Mainwaring of Ightfield, Shropshire and Ann More, daughter of William More.

He was awarded BA from Brasenose College, Oxford on 7 July 1598 and MA on 15 June 1601. He began a rise to prominence working for Sir Thomas Egerton, in whose household he was steward from 1602 to 1617. John Payne Collier published records by Mainwaring relating to a performance of Othello for Queen Elizabeth at this period; these were later recognised as forgeries, however. A genuine connection with William Shakespeare was an attempt led by Mainwaring in 1614 to enclose lands at Welcombe near Stratford-upon-Avon, defeated by local resistance. He was described as of Cheshire when he was knighted at the London Charterhouse on 11 May 1603.

Mainwaring also and concurrently became a courtier, carver in the household of Henry Frederick, Prince of Wales from 1604. He was appointed Clerk of the Pipe at the Exchequer from 1610 to 1616.

His financial position was improved when he became heir to Francis Wolley who died in 1609, despite litigation from family members. He became notorious as the lover of Anne Turner, hanged in 1615 for her part in the murder case of Sir Thomas Overbury. The relationship, seemingly tolerated by Anne's husband Dr. George Turner who died in 1610, led to children but no marriage. Arthur Wilson claimed that she bought powders from Simon Forman to try to bring him to wed her.

In 1624, Mainwaring was elected member of parliament for Huntingdon for the Happy Parliament. He was re-elected MP for Huntingdon in 1625 and 1626. From 1628 to around 1642 he served as Lieutenant of Windsor Forest. In 1641 the forest was the scene of disorder and poaching of the deer, and he recommended firm action around Egham, which was however thwarted by local sympathies. He had objected at the beginning of the reign of Charles I to the East India Company's gunpowder mills on the edge of Windsor Forest; later, in 1635, he was himself in the gunpowder business with Andrew Pitcairn.

He died on 29 December 1648 and was buried at Chertsey.

Parliament of England
Preceded by Sir Henry St John; Sir Miles Sandys, 1st Baronet	Member of Parliament for Huntingdon; 1624–1626; With: Sir Henry St John 1624–1625; John Goldsborough	Succeeded by Oliver Cromwell; James Montagu
