= Oliver St John, 3rd Baron St John of Bletso =

English politician (d. 1618)

Member of Parliament for Bedfordshire
- In office 1588–1596

High Sheriff of Bedfordshire
- In office 1585-1586; 1589-1590

Personal details
- Born: c. 1540
- Died: 1618 (aged 77–78)
- Spouse: Dorothy Reid
- Children: 15, including Oliver, Rowland, Anthony, Alexander, Beauchamp and Henry
- Parent: Oliver St John (father)
- Relatives: John St John (brother); Oliver St John (grandson); John St John (grandfather)

Oliver St John, 3rd Baron St John of Bletso (c. 1540–1618) was an English politician who sat in the House of Commons from 1588 until 1596 when he inherited the peerage as Baron St John of Bletso.

== Biography ==
St John was a son of Oliver St John, 1st Baron St John of Bletso, and Agnes Fisher. He was High Sheriff of Bedfordshire in 1585. In 1588 he was elected Member of Parliament for Bedfordshire. He was High Sheriff of Bedfordshire again in 1589 and was re-elected MP for Bedfordshire in 1593. He succeeded to the barony on the death of his brother John without male issue on 23 October 1596. He was Lord Lieutenant of Huntingdonshire from April 1597 until his death.

St John married Dorothy Reid, daughter of Sir John Rede or Reid, of Oddington, Gloucestershire. They had eight sons and seven daughters:

- Oliver St John, 1st Earl of Bolingbroke (1580?–1646)
- John St John, died young
- Sir Anthony St John (c.1585 – by 1651)
- Sir Alexander St John (d. 1657)
- Sir Rowland St John (1588–1645)
- Sir Henry St John (1590–1642)
- Sir Beauchamp St John (1594–1667)
- Dudley St John, (1599-1608)
- Elizabeth St John, married Sir William Beecher of Howberry
- Margaret St John, married Sir Thomas Cheney of Sundon
- Judith St John, married Sir John Thompson of Husborne Crawley in 1607
- Anne St John, married Robert Chernock of Hulcote
- Catherine St John
- Dorothy St John (1601-1632), married Edward Bourchier, 4th Earl of Bath
- Martha St John (b. 1603), married Peryam Docwra of Puckeridge

His eldest son Oliver inherited the Barony and became Earl of Bolingbroke. Of his remaining sons, John and Dudley died young, while the remaining five all became Members of Parliament.

Parliament of England
Preceded by George Rotheram; Thomas Snagge	Member of Parliament for Bedfordshire; 1588–1596; With: Edward Radclyffe 1588–1589; George Rotheram 1593–1596	Succeeded by Sir Edward Radclyffe; Oliver St John
Political offices
Preceded by Richard Charnocke	High Sheriff of Bedfordshire; 1585–1586	Succeeded by Richard Charnocke
Preceded by Ralph Astrye	High Sheriff of Bedfordshire; 1589–1590	Succeeded by George Rotheram
Preceded by The 2nd Lord St John of Bletso	Custos Rotulorum of Bedfordshire; 1596–1618	Succeeded by The Lord Wentworth
Preceded by The 2nd Lord St John of Bletso	Lord Lieutenant of Huntingdonshire; 1597–1618	Succeeded by The 4th Lord St John of Bletso; The Earl of March
Peerage of England
Preceded by John St John	Baron St John of Bletso; 1596–1618	Succeeded by Oliver St John
