= Writ of acceleration =

British writ of summons for peers

A writ in acceleration, commonly called a writ of acceleration, was a type of writ of summons that enabled the eldest son and heir apparent of a peer with more than one peerage to attend the British or Irish House of Lords, using one of his father's subsidiary titles, during his father's lifetime. This procedure could be used to bring younger men into the Lords and increase the number of capable members in a house that drew on a very small pool of talent (a few dozen families in its early centuries, a few hundred in its later centuries).

The procedure of writs of acceleration was introduced by King Edward IV in the mid-15th century. It was a fairly rare occurrence, and in over 400 years only 98 writs of acceleration were issued. The last such writ of acceleration was issued in 1992 to the Conservative politician and close political associate of John Major, Viscount Cranborne, the eldest son and heir apparent of the 6th Marquess of Salisbury. He was summoned as Baron Cecil, and not as Viscount Cranborne, the title he used by courtesy. The procedure of writs of acceleration was never used in practice following the passage of the House of Lords Act 1999, which removed the automatic right of hereditary peers to sit in the House of Lords.

Following the passage of the House of Lords (Hereditary Peers) Act 2026 it is no longer possible for hereditary peers to sit in the House of Lords unless they hold a life peerage.

== Procedure ==
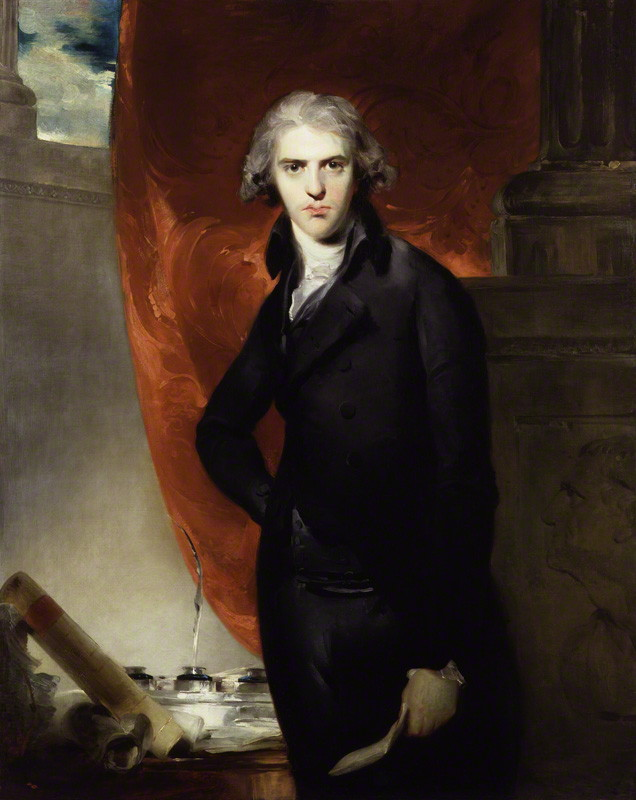
In 1803, Robert Jenkinson, later 2nd Earl of Liverpool and Prime Minister, was summoned to the Lords through a writ of acceleration as Baron Hawkesbury

A writ of acceleration was granted only if the peerage being accelerated was a subsidiary one, and not the father's highest, and if the beneficiary of the writ was the heir apparent of the actual holder of the peerages. The heir apparent was not always summoned in his courtesy title; rather, almost every person summoned to Parliament by virtue of a writ of acceleration was summoned in one of his father's baronies. For example, William Cavendish, Marquess of Hartington, heir apparent of William Cavendish, 3rd Duke of Devonshire, was summoned as Baron Cavendish of Hardwick. It was not possible for heirs apparent of peers in the Peerage of Scotland and Peerage of Ireland to be given writs of acceleration after 1707 and 1801, respectively, as holders of titles in these peerages were not automatically guaranteed a seat in the Westminster House of Lords.

An heir apparent receiving such a writ took precedence within the House of Lords according to the peerage accelerated. For example, when Viscount Cranborne was accelerated to the barony of Cecil (created in 1603), he took precedence ahead of all barons in Parliament created after that date.

If an accelerated baron died before his father, the barony passed to his heirs, if any, according to the remainder governing the creation of the barony, or else to his father. For example, Charles Boyle, Viscount Dungarvan, the eldest son of the 1st Earl of Burlington, was summoned to Parliament in 1689 in his father's barony of Clifford of Lanesborough. He predeceased his father, and his son, the Earl's grandson, was granted a writ of attendance to the Lords in the barony.

== Notable examples ==
Several issues of writs of acceleration may be especially noted.

In 1628 James Stanley, Lord Strange, heir apparent of William Stanley, 6th Earl of Derby, was summoned to the House of Lords in the ancient Barony of Strange (created in 1299), a title assumed by his father. However, the House of Lords later decided that the sixth Earl's assumption of the Barony of Strange had been erroneous. Consequently, it was deemed that there were now two Baronies of Strange, the original one created in 1299 and the new one, created "accidentally" in 1628 (see Baron Strange for more information).

Another noteworthy writ of acceleration was issued in 1717 to Charles Paulet, Marquess of Winchester, heir apparent of Charles Paulet, 2nd Duke of Bolton. He was meant to be summoned in his father's junior title of Baron St John of Basing, but was mistakenly summoned as Baron Pawlett of Basing. This inadvertently created a new peerage. However, the Barony of Pawlett of Basing became extinct on his death, while the Dukedom was inherited by his younger brother, the fourth Duke.

The summons of Thomas Butler, 6th Earl of Ossory, to the English House of Lords in 1666, as Baron Butler, of Moore Park, may also represent an error for a writ of acceleration in his father's peerage of Baron Butler, of Lanthony (cr. 1660).

Writs of acceleration to the English, later British, House of Lords
Date	Person summoned	Summoned as	Succeeded as	Notes
1482	Thomas FitzAlan, Lord Maltravers	Baron Maltravers	Earl of Arundel (1487)	
5 February 1533	Henry FitzAlan, Lord Maltravers	Baron Maltravers	Earl of Arundel (1544)	
5 February 1533	George Boleyn, Viscount Rochford	Viscount Rochford	Never succeeded	Only son of Thomas Boleyn, 1st Earl of Wiltshire; brother of Anne Boleyn
17 February 1533	Francis Talbot, Lord Talbot	Baron Talbot	Earl of Shrewsbury (1538)	
4 October 1544	John Paulet, Lord St John of Basing	Baron St John of Basing	Marquess of Winchester (1572)	
5 January 1553	John Dudley, Earl of Warwick	Earl of Warwick	Never succeeded, due to attainder.	Son of John Dudley, 1st Duke of Northumberland, attainted and executed August 1553.
5 January 1553	George Talbot, Lord Talbot	Baron Talbot	Earl of Shrewsbury (1560)	
1 March 1553	Francis Russell, Lord Russell	Baron Russell	Earl of Bedford (1555)	
14 August 1553	Thomas Radclyffe, Viscount FitzWalter	Baron FitzWalter	Earl of Sussex (1553)	
23 January 1559	Henry Hastings, Lord Hastings	Baron Hastings	Earl of Huntingdon (1560)	
23 January 1559	Henry Stanley, Lord Strange	Baron Strange	Earl of Derby (1572)	
5 May 1572	William Paulet, Lord St John of Basing	Baron St John of Basing	Marquess of Winchester (1576)	
January 1581	John Russell, Lord Russell	Baron Russell	Never succeeded	Heir apparent of Francis Russell, 2nd Earl of Bedford, but predeceased his father.
28 January 1589	Gilbert Talbot, Lord Talbot	Baron Talbot	Earl of Shrewsbury (1590)	
28 January 1589	Ferdinando Stanley, Lord Strange	Baron Strange	Earl of Derby (1593)	
31 January 1604	William Howard, Lord Howard of Effingham	Baron Howard of Effingham	Never succeeded	Heir apparent of Charles Howard, 1st Earl of Nottingham, but predeceased his father.
31 January 1604	Henry Somerset, Lord Herbert	Baron Herbert	Earl of Worcester (1628)	created Marquess of Worcester in 1642
8 February 1610	Thomas Clinton, Lord Clinton de Say	Baron Clinton	Earl of Lincoln (1572)	
8 February 1610	Theophilus Howard, Lord Howard de Walden	Baron Howard de Walden	Earl of Suffolk (1626)	
February 1621	William Seymour, Lord Beauchamp	Baron Beauchamp	Earl of Hertford (1621)	restored to the forfeit title of Duke of Somerset in 1660
10 February 1624	John Paulet, Lord St John of Basing	Baron St John of Basing	Marquess of Winchester (1628)	
28 March 1626	Algernon Percy, Lord Percy	Baron Percy	Earl of Northumberland (1632)	
1 April 1626	Spencer Compton, Lord Compton	Baron Compton	Earl of Northampton (1630)	
22 May 1626	Edward Montagu, Lord Kimbolton	Baron Montagu of Kimbolton	Earl of Manchester (1642)	
February 1628	Henry Ley, Lord Ley	Baron Ley	Earl of Marlborough (1629)	
7 March 1628	James Stanley, Lord Strange	Baron Strange	Earl of Derby (1642)	See introduction
23 April 1628	Hon. Edward Conway	Baron Conway de Ragley	Viscount Conway (1631)	
3 November 1640	Charles Howard, Viscount Andover	Baron Howard of Charlton	Earl of Berkshire (1669)	
3 November 1640	Ferdinando Hastings, Lord Hastings	Baron Hastings	Earl of Huntingdon (1643)	
3 November 1640	Hon. Thomas Wentworth	Baron Wentworth	Never succeeded	Heir apparent of Thomas Wentworth, 1st Earl of Cleveland, but predeceased his father.
3 November 1640	Montagu Bertie, Lord Willoughby de Eresby	Baron Willoughby de Eresby	Earl of Lindsey (1642)	
27 November 1640	John Carey, Viscount Rochford	Baron Hunsdon of Hunsdon	Earl of Dover (1666)	
11 January 1641	Henry Pierrepont, Lord Pierrepont	Baron Pierrepont	Earl of Kingston-upon-Hull (1643)	created Marquess of Dorchester in 1645
26 January 1641	Robert Rich, Lord Rich	Baron Rich	Earl of Warwick (1658)	
14 May 1641	Oliver St John, Lord St John of Bletso	Baron St John of Bletso	Never succeeded	Heir apparent of Oliver St John, 1st Earl of Bolingbroke, but predeceased his father.
9 June 1641	George Digby, Lord Digby	Baron Digby	Earl of Bristol (1653)	
14 January 1678	Henry Howard, Earl of Arundel	Baron Mowbray	Duke of Norfolk (1684)	
22 October 1680	Robert Leke, Lord Deincourt	Baron Deincourt	Earl of Scarsdale (1681)	
1 November 1680	Hon. Conyers Darcy	Baron Conyers	Earl of Holderness (1689)	
11 July 1689	Charles Berkeley, Viscount Dursley	Baron Berkeley	Earl of Berkeley (1698)	
11 July 1689	Robert Sidney, Viscount L'Isle	Baron Sydney of Penshurst	Earl of Leicester (1698)	
16 July 1689	Charles Boyle, 3rd Viscount Dungarvan	Baron Clifford	Never succeeded	Heir apparent of Richard Boyle, 1st Earl of Burlington, but predeceased his father
16 July 1689	Charles Granville, Lord Lansdown	Baron Granville	Earl of Bath (1701)	
3 March 1690	Peregrine Osborne, 2nd Viscount Dunblane	Baron Osborne	Duke of Leeds (1712)	
19 April 1690	Robert Bertie, Lord Willoughby de Eresby	Baron Willoughby de Eresby	Earl of Lindsey (1701)	created Marquess of Lindsey in 1706 and Duke of Ancaster and Kesteven in 1715
5 March 1705	James Berkeley, Viscount Dursley	Baron Berkeley	Earl of Berkeley (1710)	
28 December 1711	James Compton, Lord Compton	Baron Compton	Earl of Northampton (1727)	
29 December 1711	Charles Bruce, Viscount Bruce of Ampthill	Baron Bruce of Whorlton	Earl of Ailesbury (1741)	
28 January 1713	Peregrine Osborne, Marquess of Carmarthen	Baron Osborne	Duke of Leeds (1729)	
4 March 1715	Richard Lumley, Viscount Lumley	Baron Lumley	Earl of Scarbrough (1721)	
16 March 1715	Peregrine Bertie, Marquess of Lindsey	Baron Willoughby de Eresby	Duke of Ancaster and Kesteven (1723)	
12 April 1717	Charles Paulet, Marquess of Winchester	Baron Pawlett of Basing	Duke of Bolton (1722)	See introduction
8 November 1718	Anthony Grey, Earl of Harold	Baron Lucas of Crudwell	Never succeeded	Heir apparent of Henry Grey, 1st Duke of Kent, but predeceased his father.
24 May 1723	Hon. Charles Townshend	Baron Townshend	Viscount Townshend (1738)	As his father was already Lord Townshend, Charles was styled Lord Lynn after the barony's territorial designation of Lynn Regis
11 June 1733	John Hervey, Lord Hervey	Baron Hervey	Never succeeded	Heir apparent of John Hervey, 1st Earl of Bristol, but predeceased his father.
17 January 1734	John Poulett, Viscount Hinton	Baron Poulett	Earl Poulett (1743)	As his father was already Lord Poulett, John was styled Lord Hinton after the barony's territorial designation of Hinton St George
22 January 1750	Henry Hyde, Viscount Cornbury	Baron Hyde	Never succeeded	Heir apparent of Henry Hyde, 4th Earl of Clarendon, but predeceased his father.
13 June 1751	William Cavendish, Marquess of Hartington	Baron Cavendish of Hardwick	Duke of Devonshire (1755)	
15 May 1776	Francis Osborne, Marquess of Carmarthen	Baron Osborne	Duke of Leeds (1789)	
30 November 1798	Robert Hobart, Lord Hobart	Baron Hobart	Earl of Buckinghamshire (1804)	
25 February 1799	George Granville Leveson-Gower, Earl Gower	Baron Gower	Marquess of Stafford (1803)	created Duke of Sutherland in 1833.
29 June 1801	Thomas Pelham, Lord Pelham of Stanmer	Baron Pelham of Stanmer	Earl of Chichester (1805)	
15 June 1801	George Legge, Viscount Lewisham	Baron Dartmouth	Earl of Dartmouth (1801)	
15 November 1803	Robert Jenkinson, Lord Hawkesbury	Baron Hawkesbury	Earl of Liverpool (1808)	
16 October 1804	George Ashburnham, Viscount St Asaph	Baron Ashburnham	Earl of Ashburnham (1812)	
12 March 1806	George Spencer-Churchill, Marquess of Blandford	Baron Spencer of Wormleighton	Duke of Marlborough (1817)	
4 November 1806	Alexander Hamilton, Marquess of Douglas and Clydesdale	Baron Dutton	Duke of Hamilton (1819)	
11 April 1807	Charles Montagu-Scott, Earl of Dalkeith	Baron Scott of Tyndale	Duke of Buccleuch and Queensberry (1812)	
11 April 1807	George Gordon, Marquess of Huntly	Baron Gordon	Duke of Gordon (1827)	
12 March 1812	Hugh Percy, Earl Percy	Baron Percy	Duke of Northumberland (1817)	
5 January 1822	George Cholmondeley, Earl of Rocksavage	Baron Newburgh	Marquess of Cholmondeley (1827)	
22 November 1826	George Sutherland-Leveson-Gower, Earl Gower	Baron Gower	Duke of Sutherland (1833)	At the time of the writ of acceleration, he was heir apparent of George Leveson-Gower, 2nd Marquess of Stafford, who was created Duke of Sutherland in 1833
15 January 1833	Henry Paget, Earl of Uxbridge	Baron Paget of Beaudesert	Marquess of Anglesey (1854)	
15 January 1833	Francis Russell, Marquess of Tavistock	Baron Howland	Duke of Bedford (1839)	
15 January 1833	George Grey, Lord Grey of Groby	Baron Grey of Groby	Never succeeded	Heir apparent of George Grey, 6th Earl of Stamford, but predeceased his father.
8 January 1835	George Pratt, Earl of Brecknock	Baron Camden	Marquess Camden (1840)	
2 July 1838	Francis D'Arcy-Osborne, Marquess of Carmarthen	Baron Osborne	Duke of Leeds (1838)	
5 July 1838	George Brudenell-Bruce, Earl Bruce	Baron Bruce of Tottenham	Marquess of Ailesbury (1856)	
28 February 1839	Hugh Fortescue, Viscount Ebrington	Baron Fortescue	Earl Fortescue (1841)	
16 August 1841	Henry Howard, Earl of Surrey	Baron Maltravers	Duke of Norfolk (1842)	
8 September 1841	William Lowther, Viscount Lowther	Baron Lowther	Earl of Lonsdale (1844)	
4 November 1844	Edward Smith-Stanley, Lord Stanley	Baron Stanley	Earl of Derby (1851)	Resigned from the Commons in September, in advance of the writ being issued
8 April 1853	George Byng, Viscount Enfield	Baron Strafford	Earl of Strafford (1860)	
11 July 1856	Henry Petty-Fitzmaurice, Earl of Shelburne	Baron Wycombe	Marquess of Lansdowne (1863)	Resigned from the Commons shortly before the writ was issued
6 May 1859	Charles Bennett, Lord Ossulston	Baron Ossulston	Earl of Tankerville (1859)	
5 December 1859	Hugh Fortescue, Viscount Ebrington	Baron Fortescue	Earl Fortescue (1861)	Resigned from the Commons in January 1859
9 July 1863	Ferdinand Seymour, Earl St Maur	Baron Seymour	Never succeeded	Heir apparent of Edward Seymour, 12th Duke of Somerset, but predeceased his father.
14 September 1870	William Eliot, Lord Eliot	Baron Eliot	Earl of St Germans (1877)	
26 February 1874	George Byng, Viscount Enfield	Baron Strafford	Earl of Strafford (1886)	Byng had been in the Commons until defeated at the general election the previous month
5 September 1876	William Keppell, Viscount Bury	Baron Ashford	Earl of Albemarle (1891)	
12 April 1880	William Amherst, Viscount Holmesdale	Baron Amherst	Earl Amherst (1886)	
22 July 1887	Henry Percy, Earl Percy	Baron Lovaine	Duke of Northumberland (1899)	
6 June 1896	Henry Manners, Marquess of Granby	Baron Manners	Duke of Rutland (1906)	
9 January 1941	Roundell Palmer, Viscount Wolmer	Baron Selborne	Earl of Selborne (1942)	Had resigned from the Commons two months earlier
21 January 1941	Robert Gascoyne-Cecil, Viscount Cranborne	Baron Cecil	Marquess of Salisbury (1947)	Sitting in the Commons at the time the writ was issued
16 January 1951	Gilbert Heathcote-Drummond-Willoughby, Lord Willoughby de Eresby	Baron Willoughby de Eresby	Earl of Ancaster (1951)	
29 April 1992	Robert Gascoyne-Cecil, Viscount Cranborne	Baron Cecil	Marquess of Salisbury (2003)	Created a life peer as Baron Gascoyne-Cecil in 1999

Writs of Acceleration to Irish House of Lords
Date	Person summoned	Summoned as	Succeeded as	Notes
13 July 1608	Henry O'Brien, Lord Ibrickane	Baron Ibrickane	Earl of Thomond (1624)	
8 August 1662	Thomas Butler, Earl of Ossory	Earl of Ossory	Never succeeded	Heir apparent of James Butler, 1st Duke of Ormonde, but predeceased his father.
8 August 1662	Charles MacCarty, Viscount Muskerry	Viscount Muskerry	Never succeeded	Heir apparent of Donough MacCarty, 1st Earl of Clancarty, but predeceased his father.
28 January 1663	Charles Boyle, Viscount Dungarvan	Viscount Dungarvan	Never succeeded	Heir apparent of Richard Boyle, 2nd Earl of Cork, but predeceased his father.
30 October 1665	William Brabazon, Lord Brabazon	Baron Brabazon of Ardee	Earl of Meath (1675)	
4 October 1711	Michael Burke, Lord Dunkellin	Baron of Dunkellin	Earl of Clanricarde (1722)	
9 March 1715	Chaworth Brabazon, Lord Brabazon	Baron Brabazon of Ardee	Earl of Meath (1715)	
23 March 1736	James Hamilton, Lord Paisley	Baron Mountcastle	Earl of Abercorn (1744)	

== Alternatives ==
When it had been decided that the eldest son of a peer should become a member of the House of Lords, the alternative to a writ of acceleration was to create a completely new peerage. For example, in 1832 Edward Smith-Stanley, Lord Stanley, son and heir apparent of Edward Smith-Stanley, 12th Earl of Derby, was given a new peerage as Baron Stanley, of Bickerstaffe. Two years later he succeeded his father in the Earldom. This was in contrast to his son, Edward Smith-Stanley, 14th Earl of Derby, who in 1844 was summoned to the House of Lords through a writ of acceleration in the aforementioned title of Baron Stanley, of Bickerstaffe.

Other examples of new peerages being created for heirs apparent include the barony of Butler in the peerage of England, 1666, for Thomas Butler, 6th Earl of Ossory, eldest son of James Butler, 1st Duke of Ormonde, who sat in the English House of Lords by virtue of this title, although he had been accelerated to the Irish House of Lords as Earl of Ossory.

Similarly, after his career in the House of Commons was ended by a defeat in the October 1974 general election, Lord Balniel was given a life peerage as Baron Balniel, of Pitcorthie in the County of Fife, enabling him to sit in the House of Lords before succeeding his father, David Lindsay, 28th Earl of Crawford in 1975.

By contrast, after retiring from the House of Commons in 1992, George Younger, 4th Viscount Younger of Leckie was conferred a life peerage as Baron Younger of Prestwick, of Ayr in the District of Kyle and Carrick, there being no peerage held by his father other than the viscountcy. For reason both that his father was a baron and that he had no other peerages, John Wyndham, 1st Baron Egremont could not be sent to House of Lords by writ of acceleration, but was created Baron Egremont in 1964, by which title he continued to be known after succeeding as 6th Baron Leconfield in 1967.

Eldest sons of peers who had not received a writ of acceleration or a new peerage were eligible to stand for election to the House of Commons. It was far more common for eldest sons of peers to sit in the House of Commons than to receive a writ of acceleration or a new peerage. Before the 20th century, it was generally very easy for such men to find a constituency willing to elect them if they had any inclination for politics.

== French peerage ==
French ducal coronet

In the peerage of the Ancien Régime of France, a similar procedure was possible: the resignation of peerage. Any lay peer—all of them dukes—could resign his peerage to his heir, thus allowing the heir to enjoy all privileges of peerage, such as presence in Parliament. The eldest peer was almost always granted a brevet allowing him to keep the honors and precedence of the resigned peerage. In many cases, the procedure of resignation was only used to grant heirs, often around the time of their wedding, new titles: as both men had now the honors of a duke but only one similarly named dukedom could exist at any time, one of the two took a new title (such as duc de Chaulnes and duc de Picquigny, or duc de Saint-Simon and duc de Ruffec). This procedure was different from the use of a courtesy title by the eldest son of a peer holding multiple dukedoms (such as the duc de Luynes, also duc de Chevreuse). From 1755, the royal authorization for these resignations was no longer granted; the king chose instead to grant brevets of precedence to the heirs rather than to their fathers after resignation. The first one of these brevet dukes was Louis-Léon de Brancas, eldest son of the Duke of Villars, brevetted Duke of Lauragais in 1755.
