= Paulet St John, 3rd Earl of Bolingbroke =

English peer

Member of Parliament for Bedford
- In office 1663–1685

Personal details
- Born: 23 November 1634
- Died: 5 October 1711 (aged 76)
- Relatives: Oliver St John (brother); Oliver St John (uncle); Oliver St John (grandfather)

Paulet St John, 3rd Earl of Bolingbroke (23 November 1634 – 5 October 1711), known as Paulet St John until 1688, was an English politician who sat in the House of Commons from 1663 to 1685. He inherited the English peerages of Earl of Bolingbroke and Baron St John of Bletso in 1688.

== Biography ==
St John was the younger son of Sir Paulet St John, younger son of Oliver St John, 1st Earl of Bolingbroke. His mother was Elizabeth Vaughan. In 1663, he was elected Member of Parliament for Bedford in a by-election to the Cavalier Parliament. He was re-elected MP for Bedford in the two elections of 1679 and in 1681. In 1688 he succeeded his elder brother in the earldom and entered the House of Lords. The following year he was appointed Custos Rotulorum of Bedfordshire, which he remained until his death. He was also a Recorder of Bedford.

Lord Bolingbroke died unmarried in October 1711, aged 76. The earldom became extinct on his death while he was succeeded in the barony of St John of Bletso by his kinsman Sir Paulet St Andrew St John, 5th Baronet.

Parliament of England
Preceded by Richard Taylor; John Kelyng	Member of Parliament for Bedford; 1663–1685; With: Richard Taylor 1663–1667; Sir William Beecher 1667–1679; Sir William Francklyn 1679–1685	Succeeded by Sir Anthony Chester, Bt; Thomas Christie
Honorary titles
Preceded by The Earl of Ailesbury	Custos Rotulorum of Bedfordshire; 1689–1711	Succeeded by The Duke of Kent
Peerage of England
Preceded by Oliver St John	Earl of Bolingbroke; 1688–1711	Extinct
Preceded by Oliver St John	Baron St John of Bletso; 1688–1711	Succeeded by Paulet St Andrew St John
