= Andrew St John, 21st Baron St John of Bletso =

English peer

Andrew St John, 21st Baron St John of Bletso TD
- Born: 23 August 1918
- Died: 11 February 1978 (aged 59)
- Spouse: Katherine Berg (m. 1955)
- Relatives: Beauchamp St John (grandfather); Frank Lockwood (grandfather)
- Military career
- Service: British Army; Royal Artillery
- Rank: Lieutenant Colonel
- Unit: Tower Hamlets Regiment
- Wars: World War II
- Awards: Territorial Decoration

Lieutenant Colonel Andrew Beauchamp St John, 21st Baron St John of Bletso TD (23 August 1918 – 11 February 1978) was an English peer, a member of the House of Lords from 1976 until his death.

== Biography ==
St John was the third son of Rowland Tudor St John, third son of Beauchamp St John, 17th Baron St John of Bletso and Katherine Madge Lockwood, a daughter of Sir Frank Lockwood QC MP, a barrister and member of parliament. He was educated from 1932 to 1935 at Wellington College and joined the Bank of England in 1937. He served in the British Army in the Second World War, and later rose to the rank of Lieutenant-Colonel in the Royal Artillery (TA), commanding the Tower Hamlets Regiment (TA) from 1951 to 1954. He was awarded the Territorial Decoration.

After the war, St John was living at Old Deer Park Gardens Richmond with his parents, and in 1957 emigrated to South Africa, where he joined Syfret's Trust Company in Cape Town. He became the 21st Baron St John on the death of his cousin in 1976, holding the title for just under two years until his own death in 1978.

In 1955, St John married Katherine Berg, daughter of Alfred Berg. They had one son, Anthony Tudor St John, who succeeded his father.

Peerage of England
Preceded by John St John	Baron St John of Bletso; 1976–1978	Succeeded by Anthony St John
