= Oliver St John, 1st Earl of Bolingbroke =

English nobleman and politician

- The Rt Hon. the Earl of Bolingbroke KB

Member of Parliament for Bedfordshire
- In office 1601–1611

Personal details
- Born: 1584
- Died: 1646 (aged 61–62)
- Spouse: Elizabeth Paulet (m. 1602)
- Children: 7, including Oliver, 5th Baron St John of Bletso
- Parent: Oliver, 3rd Baron St John of Bletso (father)
- Relatives: Oliver St John, 1st Baron St John of Bletso (grandfather); Sir Anthony St John (brother); Sir Alexander St John (brother); Sir Rowland St John (brother); Sir Henry St John (brother); Sir Beauchamp St John (brother); Oliver St John, 2nd Earl of Bolingbroke (grandson); Paulet St John, 3rd Earl of Bolingbroke (grandson)
- Education: Peterhouse, Cambridge

Oliver St John, 1st Earl of Bolingbroke, KB (1584 – June 1646), previously styled the Hon. Oliver St John from 1596 to 1610, the Hon. Sir Oliver St John until 1618, then the 4th Baron St John of Bletso, was a 17th-century English nobleman and politician.

== Life ==
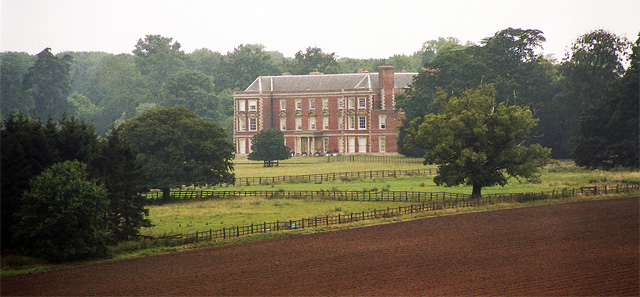
Melchbourne Park, Bedfordshire

The eldest son and heir of Oliver, 3rd Baron St John of Bletso, by his wife Dorothy Read (died 1605), daughter and co-heiress of Sir John Read, of Boddington, Gloucestershire, St John matriculated at Peterhouse, Cambridge, in about 1595 being admitted to Gray's Inn on 20 April 1597.

Elected a Member of Parliament for Bedfordshire in 1601 when styled the Hon. Oliver St John, being returned to parliament in 1604, and served on the committee to discuss the change in the royal title. St John was appointed a Knight of the Bath on 3 June 1610 at the investiture of Henry Frederick, Prince of Wales.

Succeeding his father to the family title as Baron St John of Bletso in September 1618, the following year he entertained James I sumptuously at Melchbourne Park, before being introduced to the House of Lords in 1620. Lord St John was created Earl of Bolingbroke (a manor previously belonging to the Beauchamps from whom he descended) on 28 December 1624, before taking his seat on 22 June 1625.

In December 1626, Lord Bolingbroke refused to contribute to the Forced Loan levy; but in 1638–39 he contributed towards the expenses of the Bishops' War. On 28 August 1640, he signed the petition of the twelve peers, attributing the evils of the day to the absence of parliaments, and urging Charles I to summon one and remained with the Long Parliament in 1642 when Charles retired to York. In February 1642, Parliament appointed Bolingbroke as Lord Lieutenant of Bedfordshire; in this capacity he was active in raising militia to keep the county safe.

In 1643, Lord Bolingbroke took the Solemn League and Covenant, and was called as a lay member to the Assembly of Divines. On 10 November he was one of the Commissioners named to keep custody of the Great Seal.

Excused attendance from the House of Lords in 1645, the Earl of Bolingbroke died in late June 1646.

== Family ==
St John family arms

St John married, in April 1602, Elizabeth (died 1655), daughter and heiress of William Paulet (1552–1584) and granddaughter of Sir George Paulet, brother of William Paulet, 1st Marquess of Winchester. The Earl and Countess of Bolingbroke had four sons and three daughters:

- Oliver St John, 5th Baron St John of Bletso (1603–1642), married Lady Arabella Egerton, leaving four daughters
- Hon. Sir Paulet St John KB (1608–1638), married Elizabeth (died 1668), daughter and heiress of Sir Rowland Vaughan (1584–1641) of the Spital, Stepney (now Spitalfields), having three sons:
  - Oliver St John, 2nd Earl of Bolingbroke (1634–1688)
  - Paulet St John, 3rd Earl of Bolingbroke (1634–1711)
  - Francis St John, educated at Corpus Christi College, Cambridge, and died unmarried
- Hon. Francis St John, died unmarried
- Hon. Anthony St John (1618–1673), married Ann Keynsham (d. 1700), of Tempsford, Bedfordshire
- Hon. Elizabeth St John, died young
- Lady Dorothy St John (d. 1628), married John Carey, 2nd Earl of Dover, without issue
- Hon. Barbara St John, died young

His eldest son, Lord St John, was mortally wounded in 1642 at the Battle of Edgehill predeceasing him without male issue. The earldom devolved in 1646 upon his grandson, Oliver St John, eldest son of Lord Bolingbroke's younger son, the Hon. Sir Paulet St John.

His five younger brothers, Anthony, Alexander, Rowland, Henry and Beauchamp St John all became MPs and received knighthoods.

== See also ==
- St John baronets

Parliament of England
Preceded by Sir Edward Radclyffe; Sir Nicholas Luke	Member of Parliament for Bedfordshire; 1601–1611; With: Sir Edward Radclyffe	Succeeded by Sir Henry Grey; Sir Oliver Luke
Political offices
Preceded by The Lord St John of Bletso	Lord Lieutenant of Huntingdonshire; 1619–1627; With: The Duke of Lennox 1619–1624; The Earl of Manchester 1624–1627	Succeeded by The Earl of Manchester
Preceded by The Earl of Manchester	Lord Lieutenant of Huntingdonshire; 1629–1636; With: The Earl of Manchester	Succeeded by The Earl of Manchester
Preceded by The Earl of Kent	Lord Lieutenant of Bedfordshire (Parliamentary); 1639–1646	Succeeded by Disputed
Peerage of England
New creation	Earl of Bolingbroke; 1624–1646	Succeeded by Oliver St John
Preceded by Oliver St John	Baron St John of Bletso; 1618–1641	Succeeded by Oliver St John
Preceded by Oliver St John	Baron St John of Bletso; 1642–1646	Succeeded by Oliver St John
