= Oliver St John, 2nd Earl of Bolingbroke =

British peer

- Born: Before 1634
- Died: 18 March 1688
- Spouse: Frances Cavendish (m. 1654; died 1678)
- Parents: Sir Paulet St John (father); Elizabeth Vaughan (mother)
- Relatives: Paulet St John (brother); Oliver St John (uncle); Oliver St John (grandfather)

Oliver St John, 2nd Earl of Bolingbroke (bef. 1634 – 18 March 1688), styled Lord St John of Bletsoe from 1642 to 1646, was an English peer and landowner in Bedfordshire.

== Biography ==
The eldest son of Sir Paulet St John (d. 1638) and his wife Elizabeth Vaughan, he became heir apparent to his grandfather, Oliver St John, 1st Earl of Bolingbroke, after the death of his uncle Oliver St John, 5th Baron St John of Bletso at the Battle of Edgehill in 1642. On 24 November 1654, he married Lady Frances Cavendish (d. 15 August 1678), the daughter of William Cavendish, 1st Duke of Newcastle-upon-Tyne, by whom he had no children.

The St John family were Presbyterians and supported Parliament during the English Civil War, but did not take part in government during the Interregnum. In 1661, he succeeded his relative Samuel Browne as recorder of Bedford, and took the oath against the Covenant upon becoming a freeman of the town. He was appointed Custos Rotulorum of Bedfordshire in 1667 after the death of the 1st Earl of Cleveland; the Earl of Ailesbury was added as a joint holder of the office in 1671, and Bolingbroke was removed from the office by James II in 1681.

Bolingbroke died childless on 18 March 1688 and was buried at Bletsoe. He was succeeded by his younger brother, Paulet St John.

Honorary titles
Preceded by The Earl of Cleveland	Custos Rotulorum of Bedfordshire; 1667–1681; With: The Earl of Ailesbury 1671–1681	Succeeded by The Earl of Ailesbury
Peerage of England
Preceded by Oliver St John	Earl of Bolingbroke; 1646–1688	Succeeded by Paulet St John
