= Henry St John, 4th Viscount Bolingbroke =

- Born: March 6, 1786
- Died: October 1, 1851 (aged 65)
- Occupation: British peer

Henry St John, 4th Viscount Bolingbroke (6 March 1786 – 1 October 1851) was a British peer. He was the son of George St John, 3rd Viscount Bolingbroke and Charlotte Collins.

== Marriage and children ==
Henry married Maria, daughter of Sir Henry Paulet St John Mildmay in 1812 at St George's, Hanover Square in 1812. The couple had six children - Maria Louisa (b. 1813), Anne Jane Charlotte (b. 1814), Isabella Letitia (b. 1816), Emily Arabella Jane (b. 1817), Henry (b. 1820) and Spencer (b. 1822).

== Death ==
Henry died on 1 October 1851 while visiting his daughter in Elgin. He was buried in the family vault at St Mary's Church in Lydiard Tregoze on 7 October 1851. He was succeeded by his son Henry.

Peerage of Great Britain
Preceded by George St John	Viscount Bolingbroke; 1824–1851	Succeeded by Henry St John
Preceded by George St John	Viscount St John; 1824–1851	Succeeded by Henry St John
