= Rowland St John =

English politician (1588–1645)

Member of Parliament for Tiverton
- In office 1625

Member of Parliament for Higham Ferrers
- In office 1614

Personal details
- Born: 1588
- Died: 5 August 1645 (aged 56–57)
- Spouse: Sybilla Vaughan
- Children: 1+
- Parent: Oliver St John (father)
- Relatives: Alexander St John (brother); Oliver St John (brother); Anthony St John (brother); Beauchamp St John (brother); Henry St John (brother); Oliver St John (grandfather)
- Education: Queens' College, Cambridge

Sir Rowland St John KB (1588 – 5 August 1645) was an English politician who sat in the House of Commons in 1614 and 1625.

== Biography ==
St John was a younger son of Oliver St John, 3rd Baron St John of Bletso and his wife Dorothy Reid, daughter of Sir John Rede or Reid, of Odington, Gloucestershire. He matriculated as a fellow commoner at Queens' College, Cambridge in Easter 1604, and was probably the Rowland St John who received an MA from St John's College, Cambridge in 1614.

In 1614, St John was elected Member of Parliament for Higham Ferrers. He purchased the manor of Woodford, Northamptonshire from Simon Mallory in 1621. In 1625 he was elected MP for Tiverton. He was invested a Knight of the Bath in 1616.

St John married Sybilla Vaughan, daughter of John Vaughan of Hargast, Herefordshire. His son Oliver was created a baronet on 28 June 1660.

His five brothers, Oliver, Anthony, Alexander, Beauchamp and Henry all became MPs.

Parliament of England
Preceded by Goddard Pemberton	Member of Parliament for Higham Ferrers; 1614	Succeeded by Charles Montagu
Preceded by Sir George Chudleigh; Humphrey Weare	Member of Parliament for Tiverton; 1625; With: John Francis	Succeeded by John Drake; Peter Ball
