= John St John, 20th Baron St John of Bletso =

English peer

- Born: 3 August 1917
- Died: 13 April 1976 (aged 58); Dublin, Ireland
- Father: Moubray St John
- Relatives: Henry St John (uncle); Beauchamp St John (grandfather)

John Moubray Russell St John, 20th Baron St John of Bletso TD (3 August 1917 – 13 April 1976) was an English peer.

The only son of Moubray St John, 19th Baron St John of Bletso and his wife Evelyn, John St John became the 20th Baron Lord St John of Bletso on the death of his father in 1934. He was living at a hotel in Dublin and died unmarried in 1976, aged 58, and the title passed to a cousin, Andrew Beauchamp St John, son of Rowland St. John, the 3rd son of the 17th Baron.

Peerage of England
Preceded by Moubray St John	Baron St John of Bletso; 1934–1976	Succeeded by Andrew St John
