= St John baronets =

Set index for St John baronets

There have been four baronetcies created for persons with the surname St John, two in the Baronetage of England and two in the Baronetage of Great Britain. As of 2026 three of the creations are extant.

- St John baronets, of Lydiard Tregoze (1611): see Viscount Bolingbroke
- St John baronets of Woodford (1660): see Baron St John of Bletso
- St John baronets of Longthorpe (1715)
- St John, later St-John Mildmay baronets, of Farley (1772): see St John-Mildmay baronets
