= John St John, 11th Baron St John of Bletso =

English peer

The Right Honourable The Lord St John of Bletso
- Born: England
- Died: 24 June 1757
- Spouse: Elizabeth Crowley (m. 1725)
- Children: 6+, including John and St Andrew
- Relatives: Robert Trefusis (grandson); Paulet St John (uncle)

John St John, 11th Baron St John of Bletso (died 24 June 1757) was an English peer.

== Biography ==
The son of Andrew St John and his wife Jane Blois, daughter of William Blois of Cockfield Hall, Suffolk, he was an uncle of Paulet St John, 8th Baron St John of Bletso and succeeded his brother Rowland St John, 10th Baron St John of Bletso to the family title in 1722.

Lord St John married Elizabeth Crowley (the daughter of Ambrose Crowley) at Greenwich on 6 March 1725. Their children included:

- John St John, 12th Baron St John of Bletso
- St Andrew St John, Dean of Worcester
- Henry St John, a Royal Navy captain
- Anne, married in 1761 Cotton Trefusis, mother of Robert Trefusis, 17th Baron Clinton
- Barbara, who in 1764 became the second wife of George Coventry, 6th Earl of Coventry.
- Jane, who married Humphr(e)y Hall of Manadon

Peerage of England
Preceded by Rowland St John	Baron St John of Bletso; 1722–1757	Succeeded by John St John
