= Oliver St John, 1st Baron St John of Bletso =

Member of the Parliament of England

Oliver St John
- Baron St John of Bletso
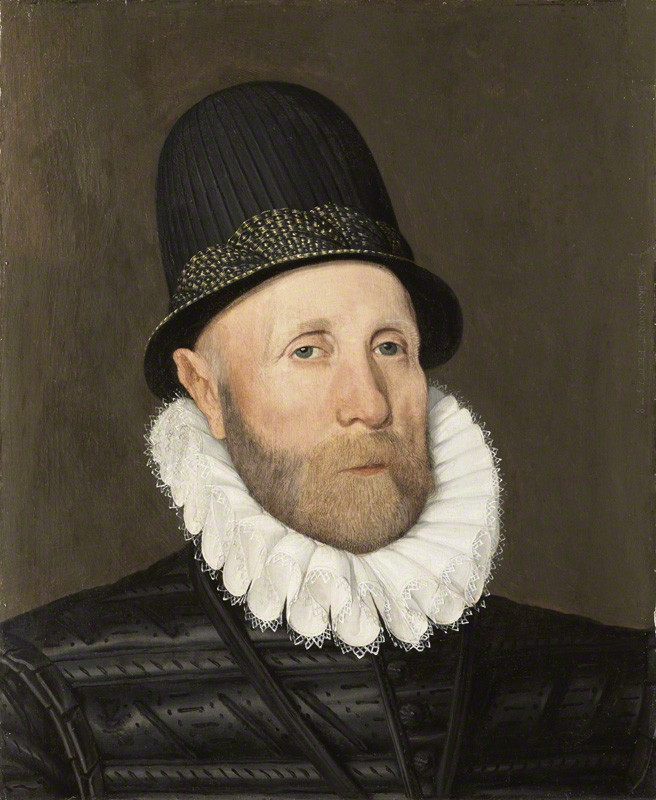
- Oliver St John, 1st Baron St John of Bletso by Arnold Bronckorst, 1578
- Born: c. 1522; Bletsoe, Bedfordshire
- Died: 21 April 1582 (aged 59–60)
- Spouses: Agnes Fisher; Elizabeth Chamber
- Issue: John St John, 2nd Baron St John of Bletso; Oliver St John, 3rd Baron St John of Bletso; Thomas St John; Francis St John; Martha St John; Judith St John; Margaret St John; Anne St John; Margery St John; Agnes St John
- Father: Sir John St John
- Mother: Margaret Waldegrave
- Occupation: English peer

Arms of St John: Argent, on a chief gules two mullets or

Oliver St John of Bletsoe, 1st Baron St John of Bletso (c. 1522 – 21 April 1582) was an English peer.

== Personal life ==
He was the son of Sir John St John (Bedfordshire MP) (born 1498) of Bletsoe (Bedfordshire) and Spelsbury (Oxfordshire) and his first wife Margaret, the daughter of Sir William Waldegrave. His paternal great-great-great-grandfather Sir Oliver St John of Bletsoe, Spelsbury and Lydiard Tregoze, Wiltshire (d. 1437) was the husband of Margaret Beauchamp of Bletso, great-great-granddaughter of Roger de Beauchamp, who was summoned to Parliament as Baron Beauchamp of Bletso from 1363 to 1379. Since then that title had not been assumed, although St John was considered to be the line of heir. On 13 January 1559 he was raised to the peerage himself as Baron St John of Bletso, in the county of Bedfordshire.

== Career ==
He served in the household of Prince Edward and on his master's accession as Edward VI in 1547, he entered the royal household. He was elected as knight of the shire (MP) for Bedfordshire in 1547. He served as High Sheriff of Bedfordshire and Buckinghamshire in 1551, and from 1560 to 1569 was Lord Lieutenant of Bedfordshire.

The offices he held during his career included:

- Gentleman waiter extraordinary, household of Prince Edward by 1547
- Gentleman waiter extraordinary, royal household 1547
- Commissioner, relief, Bedfordshire 1550
- Commissioner, musters 1560
- Commissioner, ecclesiastical causes, dioceses of Lincoln and Peterborough 1571, 1575
- High Sheriff of Bedfordshire and Buckinghamshire 1551–1552
- Justice of the Peace, Bedfordshire 1 554–1558, q. 1558/59–1582, Cambridgeshire, Huntingdonshire 1562–1582
- Custos rotulorum, Bedfordshire 1558/59
- Lord Lieutenant, Bedfordshire 1569

== Marriages and issue ==
Lord St John of Bletso married twice. He married firstly, before 8 February 1542, Agnes, the daughter of Sir John Fisher, and by her had four sons and six daughters:

- John St John, 2nd Baron St John of Bletso
- Oliver St John, 3rd Baron St John of Bletso
- Thomas St John, of Thurley, Bedfordshire (inherited when St. John of Thurley became extinct; Thomas St. John of Thurley was named as brother to Judith St. John Pelham), who married Anne Bourne, widow of Thomas Chicheley and daughter of Sir John Bourne. Thomas St. John was buried 27 Dec 1621. Had at least two children: Oliver St. John of Cayshoe and Anne St. John. He also had several step-children. Oliver St John of Cayshoe was the father of Oliver St John, the barrister and leader of the Parliamentary cause who served as Solicitor General of England 1641-48 and as Chief Justice of the Common Pleas 1648-60.
- Francis St John
- Martha St John, who married firstly, John Cheney and secondly, James Colbrond
- Judith St John, who married Sir John Pelham
- Margaret St John, who married Nicholas Luke
- Anne St John, who married firstly, Robert Corbet. After his death in 1583, she married Sir Roland Lytton.
- Margery St John
- Agnes St John

He married, before 28 August 1572, Elizabeth, the daughter of Geoffrey Chamber, and widow of Sir Walter Stonor (died 1551), Reginald Conyers (died 1560) and Edward Griffin (died 1569).

== Death ==
He died on 21 April 1582 and was succeeded in the barony by his eldest son John.

== Notes ==
Political offices
Preceded by Sir Thomas Rotheram	High Sheriff of Bedfordshire and Buckinghamshire; 1551–1552	Succeeded by Thomas Pigott
Preceded by Unknown	Lord Lieutenant of Bedfordshire; 1560–1569	Succeeded by Unknown
Peerage of England
New creation	Baron St John of Bletso; 1558–1582	Succeeded by John St John
