= Edward Griffin (attorney) =

English landowner and lawyer

Attorney General
- In office 21 May 1552 – 17 November 1558
- Appointed by: Edward VI; Mary I
- Preceded by: Henry Bradshaw
- Succeeded by: Gilbert Gerard

Solicitor General
- In office 18 June 1545 – 21 May 1552
- Appointed by: Henry VIII; Edward VI
- Preceded by: Henry Bradshaw
- Succeeded by: John Gosnold

Personal details
- Died: 16 December 1569
- Resting place: All Saints church, Dingley
- Spouses: Elizabeth Palmer (m. 1535): Anne Smith; Elizabeth Chamber (after 1560)
- Children: with Elizabeth Palmer: Sir Edward Griffin; Grace Griffin; Jane Griffin; Margaret Griffin; Mary Griffin; with Anne Smith: Anne Griffin; with Elizabeth Chamber: Sir Rice Griffin
- Parents: Sir Nicholas Griffin; Alice Thornborough
- Profession: Lawyer

Edward Griffin (died 16 December 1569) of Dingley, Northamptonshire was an English landowner and lawyer. He was Solicitor General from 1545 to 1552 and Attorney General from 1552 to 1558.

He was the second son of Sir Nicholas Griffin (1476 – 1509) of Braybrooke, Northamptonshire and his second wife, Alice Thornborough, daughter of John Thornborough of Hampshire. His elder brother was Sir Thomas Griffin (1496 – 1566) of Braybrooke who married Jane Newton, daughter of Richard Newton of Court of Wick, in Yatton, Somerset.

Following a family tradition, he was admitted as a student to Lincoln's Inn and was Autumn Reader in 1537. His brother Thomas was groom of the privy chamber at the reception of Anne of Cleves in 1539. Edward Griffin was elected one of the Governors of Lincoln's Inn in 1540. He was Solicitor General from 18 June 1545, during the reign of Henry VIII and Edward VI. He was appointed Attorney General on 21 May 1552 and continued in that role under Mary I. A devout Catholic, he was removed from office on the accession of Elizabeth I.

Griffin acquired an existing house, a Preceptory of the Knights Hospitallers, at Dingley, Northamptonshire at the dissolution of the monasteries, and rebuilt it in the 1550s. The porch of Dingley Hall is carved with the date 1558 and the initials of Griffin and his second wife, and other inscriptions. Elizabeth I came to Dingley from Collyweston on her progress on 3 August June 1566.

== Marriages and children ==
He married three times.
First, in 1535, Elizabeth Palmer, daughter of Robert Palmer of Bowden, Northamptonshire, and Grace Coste, with whom he had a son and four daughters:

- Sir Edward Griffin (d. 1620), married Lucy Conyers (d. 1620) at Wakerley in 1569, with whom he had two sons and three daughters:
  - Sir Thomas Griffin (1580 – 1615)
  - Sir Edward Griffin (1587 – 1681)
  - Frances Griffin, married Sir Gregory Cromwell, a son of Henry Cromwell, 2nd Baron Cromwell
  - Elizabeth Griffin, who married Cecil Hall of Grantham, Lincolnshire, eldest son of Arthur Hall.
  - Anne Griffin, who married Sir William Villiers of Brooksby.
- Grace Griffin married Simon Norwich of Brampton Ash, Northamptonshire.
- Jane Griffin (d. 1588) married Henry Keble of Humberston, Leicestershire.
- Margaret Griffin married William Plumpton.
- Mary Griffin married Edward Conyers, brother of Reginald Conyers of Wakerley, Northamptonshire.

Second: Anne Smith, daughter of John Smith, Baron of the Exchequer, with whom he had a daughter:

- Anne Griffin.

Third: Elizabeth Chamber, daughter of Geoffrey Chamber of Stanmore, Middlesex, and widow of Sir Walter Stonor (d. 1551) and Reginald Conyers (d. 1560), with whom he had a son:

- Sir Rice Griffin of Bickmarsh, who married Margaret Throckmorton (d. 1615), daughter of Thomas Throckmorton of Coughton, Warwickshire:
  - Edward Griffen (d. 1659) of Bickmarsh, father of Nicholas Griffin (d. 1644), who married Anne Lingen (d. 1660) of Stoke Edith.

== Gallery ==
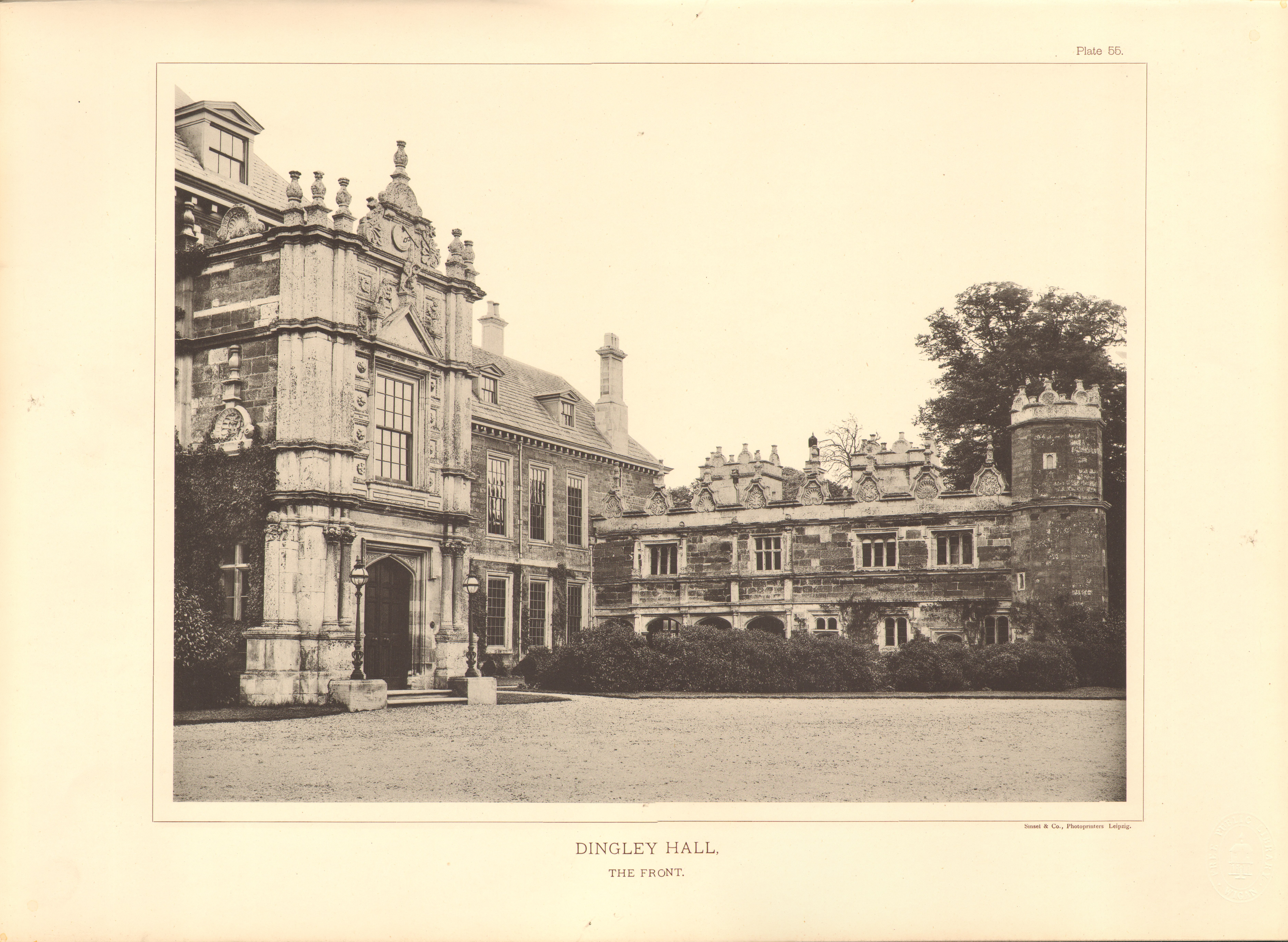
Dingley Hall

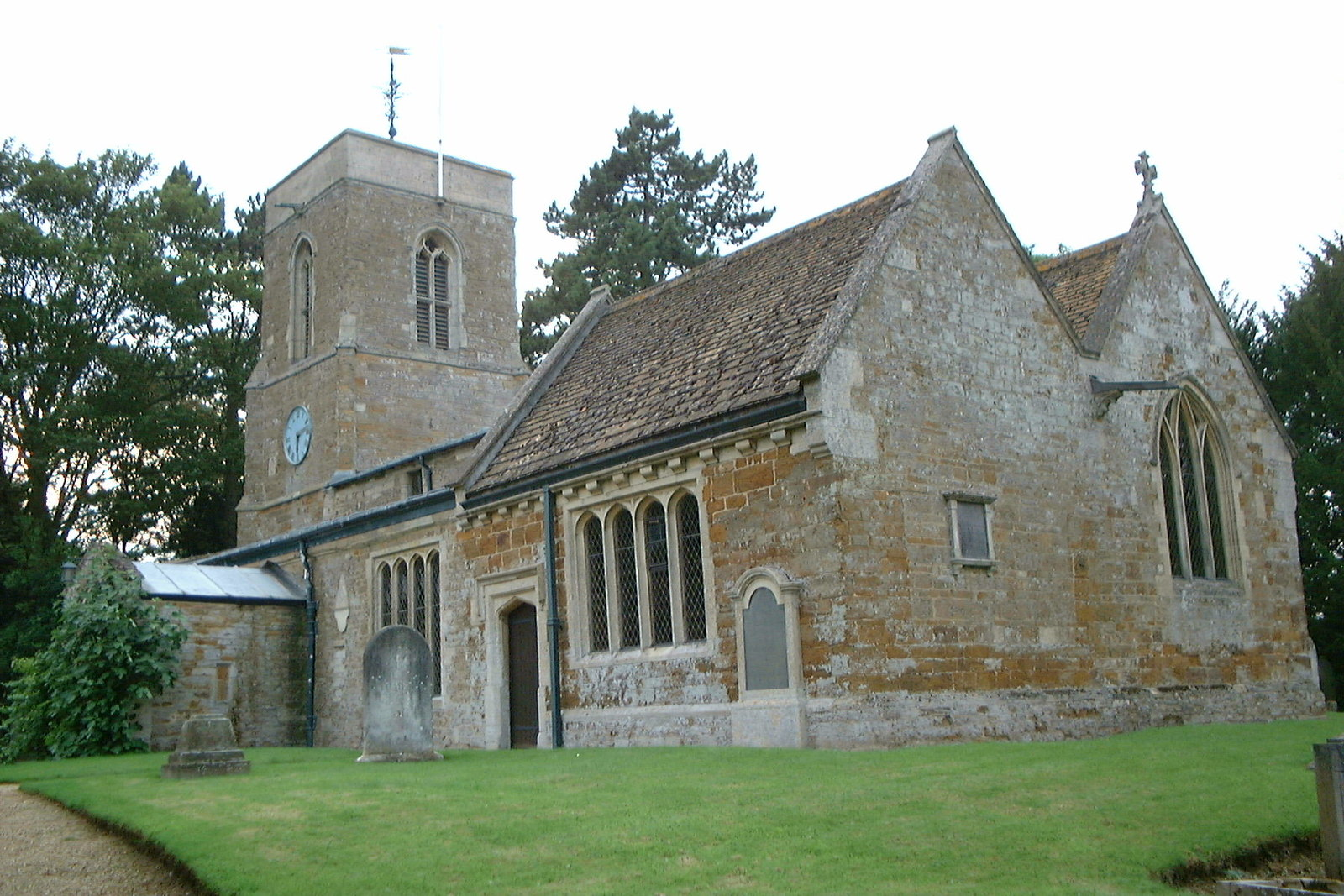
All Saints church, Dingley

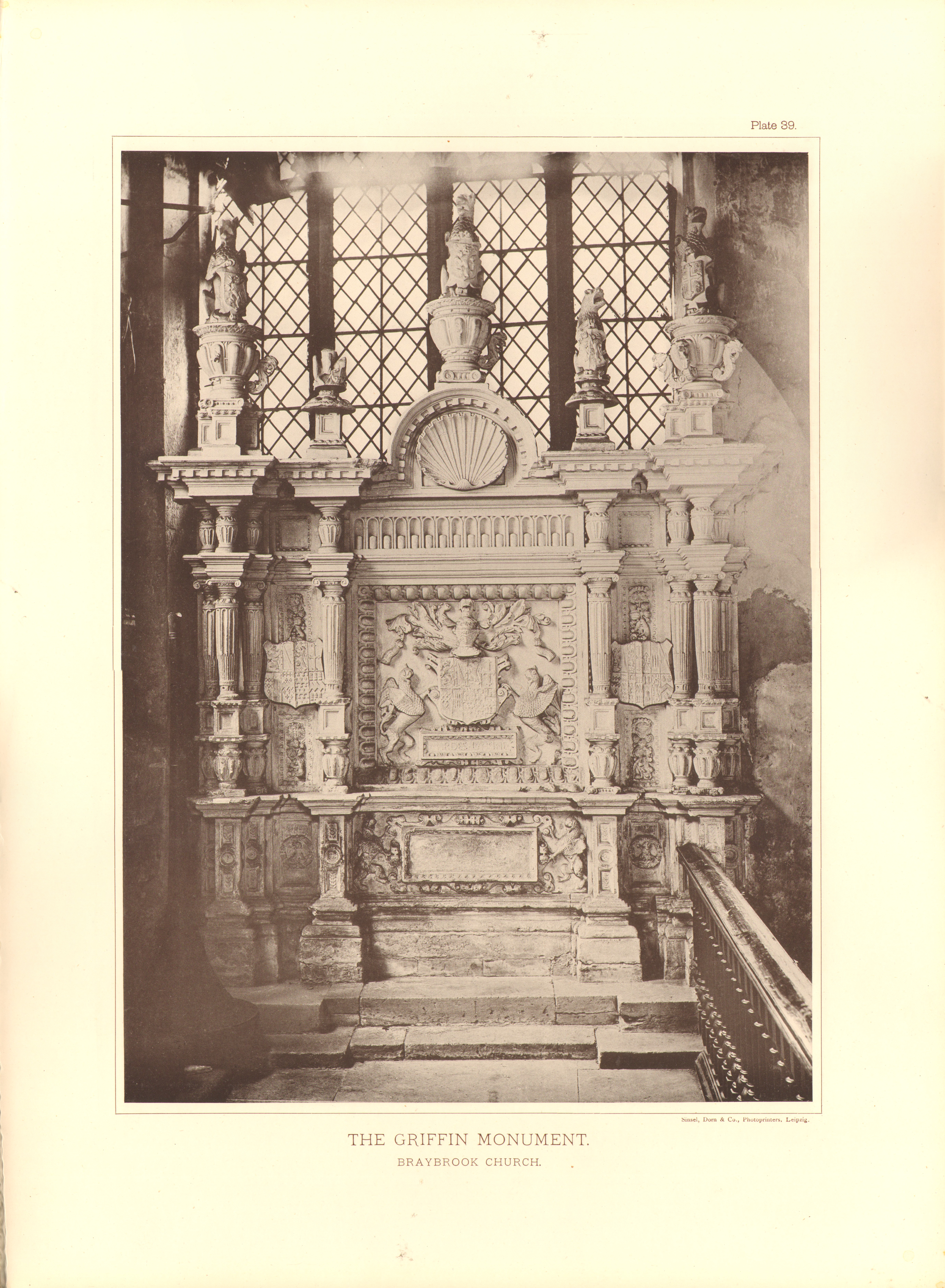
Griffin Monument at All Saints church, Braybrooke

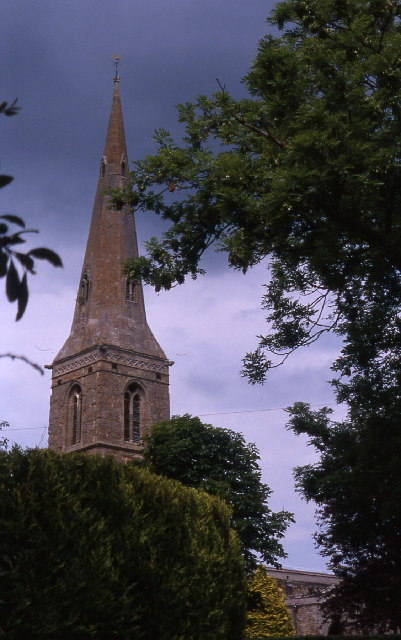
All Saints church, Braybrooke, Northamptonshire

== Death and burial ==
Edward Griffin died on 16 December 1569 and was buried near the chancel in the parish church at Dingley. He was succeeded by his son, Edward, aged 20 years 5 months and 13 days. His widow married, by 28 August 1572, Oliver St John of Bletsoe. It is not known for whom the Griffin monument (dated c. 1565-70 by Pevsner) in Braybrooke church was erected in English renaissance style, "but it is a fine example of its kind."

== Sources ==
- Burke, John; Burke, John Bernard (1846). A General and Heraldic Dictionary of the Peerages of England, Ireland, and Scotland, Extinct, Dormant, and in Abeyance (3rd ed.). London: Henry Colburn. p. 246. OCLC 897776487.
- Camden, William (1877). Fetherston, John (ed.). The Visitation of the County of Warwick, Taken by William Camden, Clarencieux King of Arms. Publications of the Harleian Society. Vol. 12. London: Mitchell and Hughes. p. 168. OCLC 210669995.
- Cokayne, G. E.; Gibbs, Vicary (1929). H. A. Doubleday; Lord Howard de Walden (eds.). The Complete Peerage, or a History of the House of Lords and all its Members from the Earliest Times. Vol. 7 (2nd ed.). London: St Catherine Press.
- Dingley, Thomas; Nichols, John Gough (1868). History from Marble: Compiled in the Reign of Charles the Second. Vol. 2. London: Printed for the Camden Society by J.B. Nichols and Sons. OCLC 655990334.
- Foss, Edward (1870). Biographia Juridica: A Biographical Dictionary of the Judges of England from the Conquest to the Present Time, 1066-1870. London: John Murray. pp. 294–295. OCLC 154151693.
- —— (1848). The Judges of England: With Sketches of their Lives, and Miscellaneous Notices Connected with the Courts at Westminster, from the Time of the Conquest. Vol. 5. London: Longman, Brown, Green, and Longmans. pp. 101, 284, 288, 346, 412. OCLC 894044.
- Fuidge, N. M. (1982). "St. John, Oliver (by 1522-82), of Bletsoe, Beds". In Bindoff, S. T. (ed.). The History of Parliament: the House of Commons 1509-1558. History of Parliament.
- Gotch, J. Alfred (1894). Architecture of the Renaissance in England: Illustrated by a Series of Views and Details from Buildings Erected Between the Years 1560-1635 with Historical and Critical Text. Vol. 1. London: B. T. Batsford. p. 42 and plate 39. OCLC 51351068.
- Howard, Joseph Jackson, ed. (1874). "Extracts from the Parish Registers of Wakerley, Northamptonshire". Miscellania Genealogica et Heraldica. Vol. 1, new series. London: Hamilton, Adams and Co. p. 416.
- Longmate, B.; Collins, Arthur (1784). A Supplement to the Fifth Edition of Collins's Peerage of England : Containing a General Account of the Marriages Births Promotions Deaths &c. Which Have Occurred in Each Family from That Publication in the Year 1779 to the Present Time. Also Genealogical and Historical Accounts of Those Families Which Have Been Advanced to the English Peerage Whether by Descent or Creation Since That Period. with Their Paternal Coats of Arms Crests Supporters and Mottoes Engraved on Thirty-Four Copper Plates. Faithfully Collected from Authentic Pedigrees in Possession of the Families or Registered in the House of Lords; Records Monumental Inscriptions and Other Authorities Which Are Cited. By B. Longmate, Editor of the Fifth Edition of Collins's Peerage. London: Printed for W. Strahan, J.F. and C. Rivington, T. Payne and Son, W. Owen, S. Crowder, T. Longman, C. Rivington, C. Dilly, J. Robson, T. and W. Lowndes, J. Johnson, G. Robinson, T. Cadell, H.L. Gardner, J. Nichols, J. Bew, R. Baldwin, J. Murray, J. Debrets, W. Fox, J. White, T. Beecroft, W. Bent, and M. Folingsby. p. 430. OCLC 642322675.
- Maddison, Arthur Roland, ed. (1903). Lincolnshire Pedigrees. Vol. 2. Publications of the Harleian Society. Vol. 51. London: Harleian Society.
- Mayers, Thomas F.; Walters, Courtney B. (2017). "Gryffyn, Griffin, Griffith, Edward". The Correspondence of Reginald Pole. Vol. 4: A Biographical Companion: The British Isles. St Andrews Studies in Reformation History. Routledge. pp. 234–235. ISBN 9781351963831.
- Metcalfe, Walter C., ed. (1887). The Visitations of Northamptonshire Made in 1564 and 1618-19, with Northamptonshire Pedigrees from Various Harleian MSS. London: Mitchell and Hughes. p. 24. OCLC 807194019.
- Nichols, John (1971) [1st pub:London: John Nichols: 1798]. History and Antiquities of the County of Leicester. Vol. 2, Pt. 2. S.R. Publishers in association with Leicestershire County Council. p. 592.
- —— (2014). Goldring, Elizabeth; Eales, Faith; Clarke, Elizabeth; Archer, Jayne Elisabeth (eds.). John Nichols's The Progresses and Public Processions of Queen Elizabeth I: A New Edition of the Early Modern Sources. Vol. 1: 1533 to 1571. Oxford: Oxford University Press. ISBN 9780199551385. OCLC 869850590.
- Pevsner, Nikolaus (2002). Cherry, Bridget (ed.). Northamptonshire (2nd ed.). New Haven: Yale University Press. p. 51. ISBN 9780300096323. OCLC 1311036478.
- Turpyn, Richard (1846). Nichols, John Gough (ed.). The Chronicle of Calais, in the Reigns of Henry VII. and Henry VIII. to the Year 1540. Edited from MSS. in the British Museum. London: Printed for the Camden Society, by J. B. Nichols and Son. OCLC 609326087.
- Yeatman, John Pym (1896). The Gentle Shakspere: A Vindication. London: Roxburghe Press. OCLC 262535981.
