= Geoffrey Chamber =

Geoffrey Chamber (floruit c. 1490 – 1544x1550) (also Chambers) was a legal advocate, an associate and agent of Thomas Cromwell's, and was Surveyor and Receiver-General to the Court of Augmentations at the time of the Dissolution of the Monasteries. He was connected with the discovery of the mechanical contrivances in the Rood of Grace at Boxley Abbey.

== Life ==
=== The Boston Pardons, 1517–1518 ===
The early life of Geoffrey Chamber is obscure. He first comes to notice in connection with the Gild of Our Lady in St Botolph's church at Boston, Lincolnshire in 1517. The town held two Pardons, the Great Pardon and the Lesser Pardon, by which members of the Gild were granted rights (on the payment of various dues and subscriptions) to consume dairy products and flesh during Lent without scruple of conscience, on the advice of physicians; the right to use and take the sacrament at a portable altar in any place; free right to choose their own confessor; the benefit of all prayers and masses for the dead, and for Christian souls; and to have copious indulgences and remissions. For the renewal of these pardons it was necessary to obtain the Pope's seal in Rome, for a substantial fee. This mission was entrusted to Geoffrey Chamber, Secretary of the Gild, who made two journeys to Rome for the purpose, in 1517 and 1518.

The story as given by John Foxe (who wrongly ascribes it to 1510) tells that Chamber met Thomas Cromwell on his way at Antwerp and, doubting his own capacity to complete the task, persuaded him to accompany him to Italy. However an original record survives showing that Chamber made his first journey alone (with his assistants) and was accompanied by Cromwell on his second journey, when he travelled via Calais. Foxe further relates that when they had arrived at Rome, Cromwell lay in wait for the Pope as he was returning from a hunting expedition, and met him with a gift of various sweetmeats which were so pleasing to the pontiff (Foxe says Julius II, but rightly Leo X) that he immediately granted the requested approvals. The Boston records, which include a fee for Cromwell, show that he returned after a comparatively short stay in Rome and that Chamber remained there for a further 16 weeks to finalize the details.

The journey had two other important outcomes. While in Italy Geoffrey Chamber was granted heraldic arms by Archbishop Cesare Riario (Patriarch of Alexandria and Bishop of Malacita) (1480–1540). These had a distinctly continental flavour, and were recited as: dor a ung croix arminie entre quatre papagaies derrier regardans de verte becquees et membres de gueules a ung chief dasur sur le chief le serpent de Millan dargent corone et engueulant ung demy ydolle entre deux roses du champ. He also chose a royal gift for King Henry, commissioning a distinguished illuminated manuscript volume containing four Apologues of Pandolfo Collenuccio of Pesaro (died 1504) and three Dialogues of Lucian of Samosata, with an integral Letter of Dedication (in his own name) to King Henry, and the Royal Arms of England incorporated into the decoration of the first text page. The text was handwritten by the papal scribe Ludovico Vicentino degli Arrighi (1475–1527) and the decoration throughout was by the Florentine artist Attavante degli Attavanti (1452–1525). This book survives and is among the Royal manuscripts in the British Library.

=== Steward of St Bartholomew's Priory ===
Chamber married Alice, one of the three daughters of Nicolas Burgh, gentleman of London, and his wife Sybell. Alice's sister Isabell was the wife of Richard Warde, and another sister Anna was a nun at the Augustinian nunnery of St Mary, Clerkenwell. Geoffrey's daughter Elizabeth, whose first marriage was made by 1533, lived until at least 1602. In 1522 William Bolton, Prior of St Bartholomew's priory in West Smithfield, appointed Geoffrey Chamber to the office of Steward of all the manors of the priory, with an annuity of £4 out of its manor of Canonbury. In 1525 Chamber was admitted to the Inner Temple, paying 20 shillings to be exempted from all offices and vacations; and in the same year he was named an executor in the substantial will of John Robynson of Boston, Merchant of the Staple at Calais, which greatly favoured the Aldermen and brethren of the Boston Gild (of whom he had been one). When proving the will in April 1529, Chamber as attorney for the executors brought a common plea in London against Ambrose Borough of Boston, yeoman, for a debt to the estate.

In Trinity term 1527 Geoffrey Chamber, with Nicholas "Borowe" and Nicholas Statham, gent., brought a plea of quare impedit at York over the advowson of Slingsby parish church in North Yorkshire, in which they claimed a right. Nicolas Burgh, at the making of his will on 7 February 1527/28, wished to be buried at St Bartholomew's priory, from whom he held the farm of Wynbergh by lease. He also held lands and tenements in Great Stanmore, Middlesex (where St Bartholomew's held the manor from St Albans Abbey), which tenantright he left to his widow Sybell for her to pay the issues and profits to their religious daughter Anne: Sybell and Richard Warde were the executors, and Prior William and Geoffrey Chamber the overseers. In 1528 Chamber, then of Stanmore, made petition to register the arms he had received from Archbishop Riario, which were confirmed by the heralds Thomas Wriothesley and Thomas Benolt. Through this time, from 1527 to 1531, Chamber was much occupied in the courts with administration of the estate of Lewis Harpesfeld, a London mercer.

In Hilary term 1528/29 a common recovery was effected against Geoffrey Chamber and Henry Huberthorne for a messuage with two watermills at Bromley. Elizabeth Chamber, Geoffrey's daughter and heir, became the second wife of Sir Walter Stonor (later Lieutenant of the Tower of London) before 1533. There were also three sons, the middle one of whom, Edward Chamber (alias Mann), later of Edith Weston, Rutland, became a Roman Catholic priest. In that year 1533 Robert Tomlinson, Alderman, of Our Lady's Guild at Boston, wrote to Cromwell that he had a gift of wildfowl for the King in connection with Anne Boleyn's coronation: "Please let Geoffrey Chamber know what you will have done with them", he asked. According to the late testimony of Edward Chamber, William Cecil had part of his upbringing in his father's house, presumably at Stanmore, and on some occasion Chamber hosted a visit of the Princess Elizabeth there.

=== Dissolution ===
In 1532 Prior William Bolton died, and Robert Fuller, Abbot of the Abbey of Holy Cross, Waltham, was elected to succeed him in commendam, holding St Bartholomew's Priory together with the abbatial dignity of Waltham. The Valor Ecclesiasticus, taken in 1535, shows Geoffrey Chamber as the late chief steward at Great Stanmore, and accounts for his annual fee of £4, but his occupation of Stanmore was not discontinued. In that year Geoffrey Chamber, gentleman, was one of the 12 jurymen (led by Sir Thomas Palmer) in the trial of Sir Thomas More, in which More's defence and condemnation rested upon his rejection of the terms of the 1534 Act establishing the King's Supremacy over the English Church. The jury, upholding the legitimacy of the Act, is said to have taken only 15 minutes to return its verdict of Guilty. In May 1536 he appeared, but was not sworn, for the petty jury in the case against Norreys, Bryerton, Weston and Smeaton.

Following the enactment of the Suppression of Religious Houses Act 1535, which passed parliament in February 1535/36, the Court of Augmentations was established in April to administer the monastic properties and revenues, with Richard Rich as its Chancellor. Geoffrey Chamber was appointed its Surveyor and Receiver-General of the King's purchased lands, a position he held until 1544, by which time the greater monasteries had also been closed. The last to be surrendered, in March 1540, was Waltham Holy Cross, Robert Fuller being sympathetic to the King's policy, and there was therefore adequate opportunity for the disposal of Waltham and St Bartholomew's at the convenience of the Court's officers.

Robert Southwell was at first Attorney of the Court and John Ashton its Auditor. The lands of the Duke of Suffolk, Lord Audeley, and those of the late Earl of Northumberland in the Welsh marches (which had been concealed by the bailiffs), were surveyed by Chamber in 1536–37; he surveyed the cantrefi of Arwystli and Cyfeiliog (late of the Duke of Richmond) – where he and Henry Somerset were to raise a cognizance or "knowledge" of £300 – and the Abbeys of Boxley, Stratford Langthorne and Warden in 1537–38. His survey or report of the manor of Tyburne within the parish of Marylebone is dated June 1539.

The Rood of Grace

In the early weeks of 1537/38 the Cistercian house of Boxley Abbey in Kent was surrendered, and Chamber went there with the mission to deface its images. The most famous of these, formerly an object of reverence and devotion, was a representation of the crucified Christ known as the Rood of Grace. When it was removed from the wall it was found to contain mechanisms, wires and sticks of wood by which the figure could be made to bow, the eyes to move as if alive, and the lower lip to open and shut as if speaking. All this mechanism was old and decayed, but it was seized upon as evidence of pious imposture, as if the monks had intended to deceive the people into believing that these motions were miraculous. Chamber interrogated the abbot, who protested that it had not been used thus in his knowledge: but the opportunity to discredit the monks was not to be missed. He took the figure to the nearby town of Maidstone on the next market-day, and stirred up a good deal of popular resentment at it.

Chamber reported these findings in a letter to Cromwell, and took the figure to London where it was shown about the Court, and afterwards it was made to stand in front of Paul's Cross as if doing penance, before being broken up and cast into a fire. The story of its discovery spread very rapidly and was taken up enthusiastically as evidence of monkish or popish deception. As propaganda it assisted the cause of the reformists considerably, but there is little to suggest that it was really used with an intention to deceive, and appears to have been given to the abbey by a stranger who had made it rather as a novelty than as anything miraculous.

=== Late troubles ===
The story of Chamber's late tenure of Stanmore, and of his misfortunes after the death of Cromwell in 1540, was told by his son Edward, when an old man in 1593, as follows:

"My father was Receiver General of Henry VIII's purchased lands in England: but demanding £100 debt due to him by the Master of the Augmentation Court, was by him cast into prison for a debt of £2,200 to the King, and his sureties were caused to pay £2,100 forfeit. My mother obtained his liberty and a lease of Stanmer, but my father's enemies got him into prison again, and made my mother acknowledge a fine on Stanmer: the King said that when the debt was paid, he was to have the land again. I left the indenture at Bletso, with my sister, whilst my lord her husband was living, on promise that my mother should have £50 a year for life."

Stanmore

Records indicate that on 10 April 1538 the manor of Great Stanmore was leased to Chamber for a term of 15 years at an annual rent of £13.13s.4d, acquitting himself or the prior of an annual payment owing to St Albans Abbey which had been customary. The manor included a tenement with a cottage in Stanmore, a tenement named "Waxwell" (in Pinner) with gardens, orchards and pastures, two closes of arable land, waters and fisheries on "Bushes Heath", and other lands in Great Stanmore and Harrow on the Hill. (Edward Chamber speaks of "a fair manor house, another gentleman's house".) St Bartholomew's Priory was surrendered on 25 October 1539. Geoffrey was associated with Alice his wife when the manor of Great Stanmore, together with the advowson of the church, passed by Fine at Easter 30 Henry VIII.

Stanmore was among the manors and other possessions of St Bartholomew's (including Bartholomew Fair and the rectory of St Sepulchre without Newgate) which were granted for life to Robert Fuller in 1540: Fuller, however, died later in the same year. On 16 June 1541, Thomas Rolfe (the King's customs officer at the port of Sandwich), Sir John Williams of Rycote (Oxon.), Henry Coke and Henry Polsted of London, Merchants Taylor, and Geoffrey Chamber, gentleman, entered recognizances of £100 each (Rolfe in £200) before the Barons of the Exchequer, to warrant that Rolfe should render his accounts yearly. Not until April 1550, on payment of 1,000 marks, was this obligation pardoned. If such was the nature of the £100 debt which Chamber claimed from the "Master of the Court", it appears that Richard Rich, Chancellor of the Augmentations, took drastic steps to dissociate himself from the matter.

Then on 20 July 1542 the King purchased from Geoffrey and Alice Chamber the premises at Stanmore, with a windmill, lands in Great and Little Stanmore and Harrow, others in Essex, and also the "premises in the parish of St Sepulchre in the ward of Faryngton Without". (This was the Chambers's London home in Gayspore Street in St Sepulchre without Newgate.) Geoffrey's survey of manors received from John St Leger is dated December 1542; in the Hilary term of 1543 he acted as attorney in common actions for recovery of debt, and he attended a parliament of the Inner Temple, serving as one of the Marshals, on 7 June 1543. On 15 May 1544 George Wright, formerly a clerk in the Court of Augmentations, was promoted to the joint offices of Surveyor and Receiver of exchanged and purchased lands, as successor to Chamber, and remained in this post until 1547.

In June 1546 Sir Francis Ascugh was obliged to sell lands to the King in lieu of £300 which his father (probably Sir William Ayscough of Stallingborough, died 1540, father of Anne Askew) owed as a surety for Chamber: in July Thomas Holland of Swineshead, Lincolnshire was, in consideration of his poverty, allowed to make a small annual payment for a similar obligation. Another surety in the same sum was John Shelton. Inventories of Chamber's goods at Great Stanmore and at St Sepulchre's are dated 1546–1547. The forfeiture of the manor of Stanmore for a debt of £2,200 is assigned by Edward Chamber to that year (38 Henry VIII). This is shown in the King's grant of 27 January 1546/47 of the lordship and advowson of Great Stanmore, with appurtenances in Harrow and premises in West Ham and in St Sepulchre's, formerly of Geoffrey Chamber, to the Basque Sir Peter de Gamboa for his services in the King's wars (he led the Spanish arquebusiers at the Battle of Pinkie Cleugh). This grant however reserved certain lands in Great and Little Stanmore, and also a tenement and garden in St Sepulchre's then in the tenure of Sir William Paget.

St Sepulchre's

On 19 January 1550, Sir Peter Gamboa was murdered by his colleague Guevara in St Sepulchre's churchyard, and his estates escheated to the Crown. Various premises in St Sepulchre's adjacent to those in tenure of Geoffrey Chamber, all of which had lately belonged to him and had been in the hands of Peter de Gamboa, are mentioned in some detail in a grant of 22 June 1550. It is later recited that, on 18 March 1549/50 (4 Edward VI), the messuage in St Sepulchre's then in Geoffrey Chamber's tenure (formerly parcel of his lands and having been granted to Peter de Gamboa), was leased for 21 years to Geoffrey and Alice his wife, at a yearly rent of 53s.4d, by patent under the Great Seal of the Court of Augmentations. On 3 July 1557 the reversion of this messuage, together with the rent and the messuage itself, were sold by the Crown to two gentlemen of Somerset together with various lands elsewhere, including various forfeitures from other sources received by attainder. At that time the St Sepulchre's premises were rated for Alice Chamber. Those which had been occupied by Geoffrey Chamber formed three messuages and two parlours with two chambers above them, when they were the subject of a grant by Queen Elizabeth in 1560.

== Close ==
The Victoria County History (Middlesex) places Geoffrey's death in 1544; against this is the personal appearance, twice, in Middlesex, of "Dominus Jeffray Chamber of London, Esquyer" ("Armiger"), in Hilary term 1546 (secondly at the octave of the Purification) to bring common pleas for recovery of debt against a miller and a husbandman of Great Stanmore, and two others. On 25 March 1547 the Privy Council ordered the release of Jeffrey Chambre from the Fleet Prison, where he had been confined for debts owing to the King, upon his bond to answer thereto. The notice of an annuity of £53.15s.10d by letters patent for Geoffrey and his wife Alicia in 1550 or 1551 may correspond to, or coincide with, the grant of a lease to Geoffrey and Alice in St Sepulchre's, mentioned as of 18 March 1549/50.

If this means that Geoffrey was still living in 1550, it is possible that he was that "Geffare Chamber Esquier" who witnessed the will of Sir Walter Stonor, possibly at Rotherfield Peppard, in January 1550/51. Geoffrey was "deceased" at the time of his son Thomas's admission to the Middle Temple in summer 1552 (below). In 1568 Thomas Batton of Burringham, Lincolnshire identified himself as "mainpernor of Geoffrey Chamber, late Particular Receiver of the Court of Augmentations" (suggesting that he was another of the sureties). The reference to Bletsoe in Edward Chamber's testimony shows that Alice Chamber, Geoffrey's widow, was living during the 1570s, when her daughter was the wife of Oliver St John.

== Family ==
Geoffrey Chamber married Alice, daughter of Nicolas Burgh and Sybell his wife. Alice Burgh (later written "Brough") survived her husband.

Their children included:

- Elizabeth Chamber, daughter and heir, who married:
  - (1), by 1533, Sir Walter Stonor, as his second wife. He died in 1551, making Dame Elizabeth executor and principal legatee of his estates and will, which was witnessed by "Geffare Chamber". (She is not to be confused with her stepdaughter Elizabeth Stonor, the wife of Sir Philip Hoby).
  - (2), Reginald Coniers or Connyers of Wakerley, Northamptonshire. He died in 1560. By this marriage Elizabeth was mother of a daughter Lucy Conyers (d. 1620), who married her stepbrother Edward Griffin junior in 1569, (below).
  - (3), Edward Griffin of Dingley, Attorney General for England and Wales, 1545–1559. He died in 1569. By this marriage Elizabeth was mother of a son Ryce Griffin, who with his elder half-brother Edward was an executor in his father's will. Edward Griffin, Elizabeth's stepson, married her daughter Lucy Conyers. A dispute over inheritance and jointures arose between Elizabeth and her stepson, following her fourth marriage.
  - (4), by 1572, Oliver St John, 1st Baron St John of Bletso. He died in 1582. Elizabeth was living in 1602.
- Thomas Chamber, "son and heir to Geoffrey Chamber, deceased", admitted 27 June 1552 to the Middle Temple: on 8 May 1553 he was allocated "the lowest chamber with Mr. Isham in 'les novelles buyldynges' in consideration of repairs done by him and a fine of 28s.8d." Possibly B.A. (Oxon) 7 April 1544, Fellow of All Souls College, Oxford 1545, supplicated Bachelor of Civil Law 1548. He obtained at Rome an indult for the Princess Elizabeth to eat white meat, eggs and flesh in Lent. Perhaps the same as the elder brother who served as a soldier with the Duke of Alba in his assault on Rome in 1556–1557, but was murdered by treachery for his money (according to his brother Edward).
- Edward Chamber, alias Mann, a recusant Catholic priest. He petitioned Queen Mary for the restitution of Great Stanmore, but she refused it, offering him instead the next living in her presentation. This he declined as simoniacal. In January 1557/58 Reginald Conyers granted to him and his heirs (?as feoffee for Elizabeth) the manor and advowson of Wakerley. In 1560 he was a co-signatory, with Sir Walter Mildmay, Sir Thomas Nevill and Thomas Leete, of his sister's marriage settlement with Edward Griffin. In prison in 1576, he was listed as a recusant priest (then of Edith Weston through the Conyers connection) by Sir James Harington in 1577; his correspondence with Father Persons SJ in 1580 shows his active work in his faith; he was summoned by Persons in 1582 to preside over the Duke of Guise's English Seminary (the 'Little College') at Eu, Normandy, which survived until 1589. Edward Chambers is said to have died at the English College, Douai, not long afterwards. However he was living in 1593 when, from Saint-Omer, he made a last (unsuccessful) claim to Great Stanmore, until then held by Sir George Blagge.
- (?John) Chamber (youngest son), who on his brother's behalf petitioned Queen Elizabeth, at her accession, for the restitution of Great Stanmore, but died soon afterwards (according to his brother Edward).
