= George Blagge =

English politician (1512–1551)

Sir George Blagge (1512 – 17 June 1551) was an English courtier, politician, soldier and a minor poet. He was the Member of Parliament for Bedford from 1545 to 1547, and Westminster from 1547 to 1551, during the reign of Edward VI. His trial and condemnation for heresy in 1546 earned him a place in Protestant martyrology. His family surname was frequently rendered Blage by contemporaries, while another variant was Blake.

== Background and education ==
Blagge was the eldest son of Mary Brooke and Robert Blagge.

- Robert Blagge was an Exchequer Baron – an important post in a court dealing mainly with equity cases. He had prospered in the Tudor administration and owned land in several parts of England:in the south-west in rural Somerset and at Bristol; near London at Holloway and Westminster in Middlesex; and in the south-east, especially at Dartford and elsewhere in Kent. The latter was acquired through his first marriage, to Katherine Brune or Brown.
- Mary Brooke was the daughter of John Brooke, 7th Baron Cobham of Cobham, Kent, an important landowner in the vicinity of Blagge's Kent holdings. Their son George was born about 1512.

George's father, Robert, died in 1522 or perhaps a year or so later, as he was later recorded as occupying his position on the bench during 1523–24. He was buried close to his first wife, Katherine, in a family chapel at the church of St Bartholomew-the-Great, still part of an Augustinian priory. He made considerable bequests to the prior and the canons, for the high altar and for painting images, and for the poor, including 20 marks for the marriage of poor girls. He was survived by his wife Mary.

There seems to have been some confusion about his legacy. In 1516 he had procured a patent for Barnaby, a son of his first marriage, to receive his own old post of Remembrancer of the Exchequer. This was disallowed in 1561 on the grounds that Robert had no legal estate at the time of his death.

Robert Blagge left George the use of his lands in the south-west and at Holloway, as well as two houses at Dartford. One of the elder sons took the property in Westminster, but it seems that George later moved there, as he was described as "of Westminster", in his pardon of 1546. The entry in Wriothesley's Chronicle dealing with his trial, before he reached the zenith of his wealth, describes Blagge as a "gentleman, a man of faire landes."

George Blagge was educated at Cambridge.

== Early career ==
=== The search for patronage ===
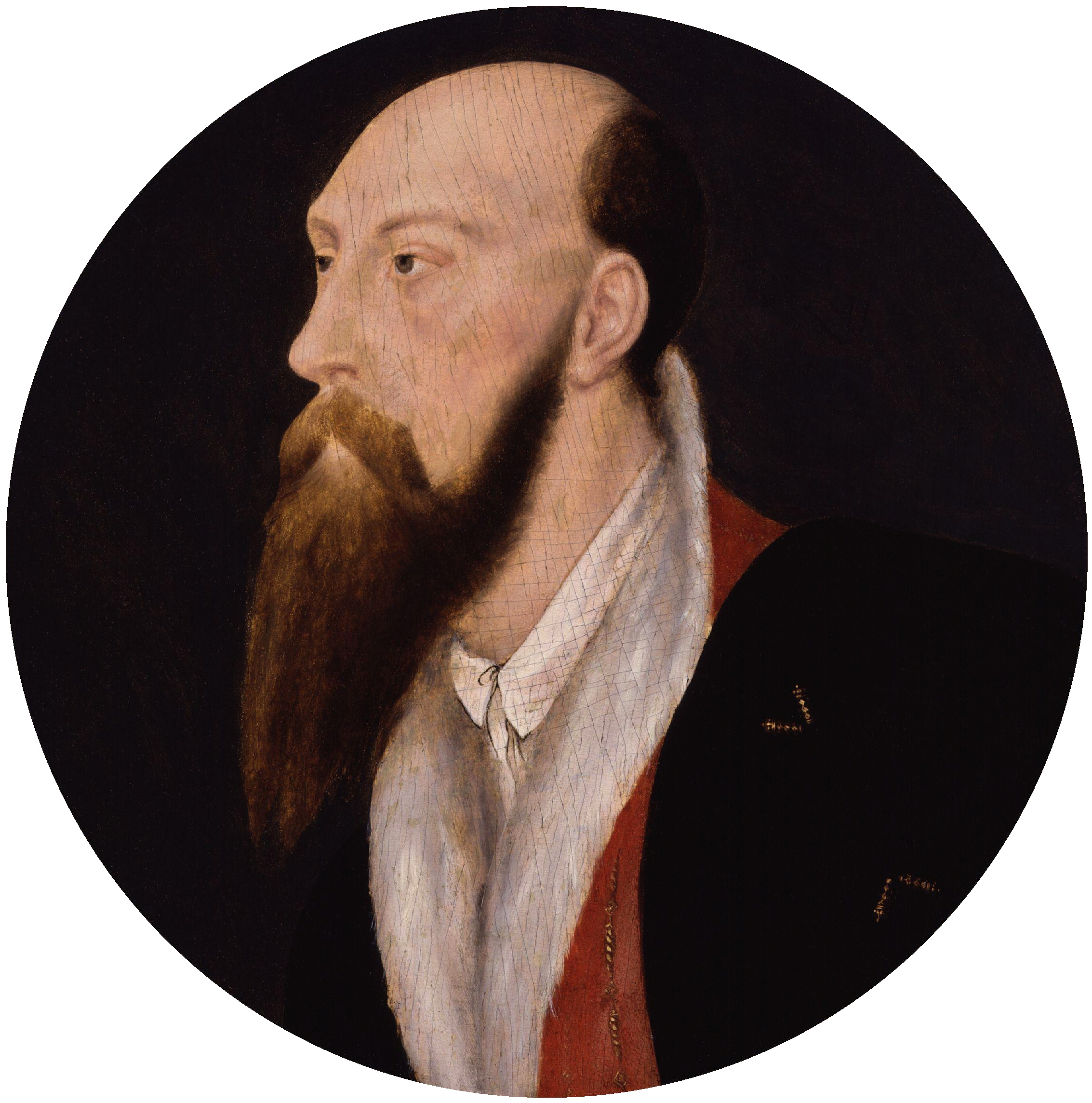
Sir Thomas Wyatt, from a painting on a wooden panel, by Hans Holbein the Younger, circa 1540. Wyatt was Blagge's first important patron.

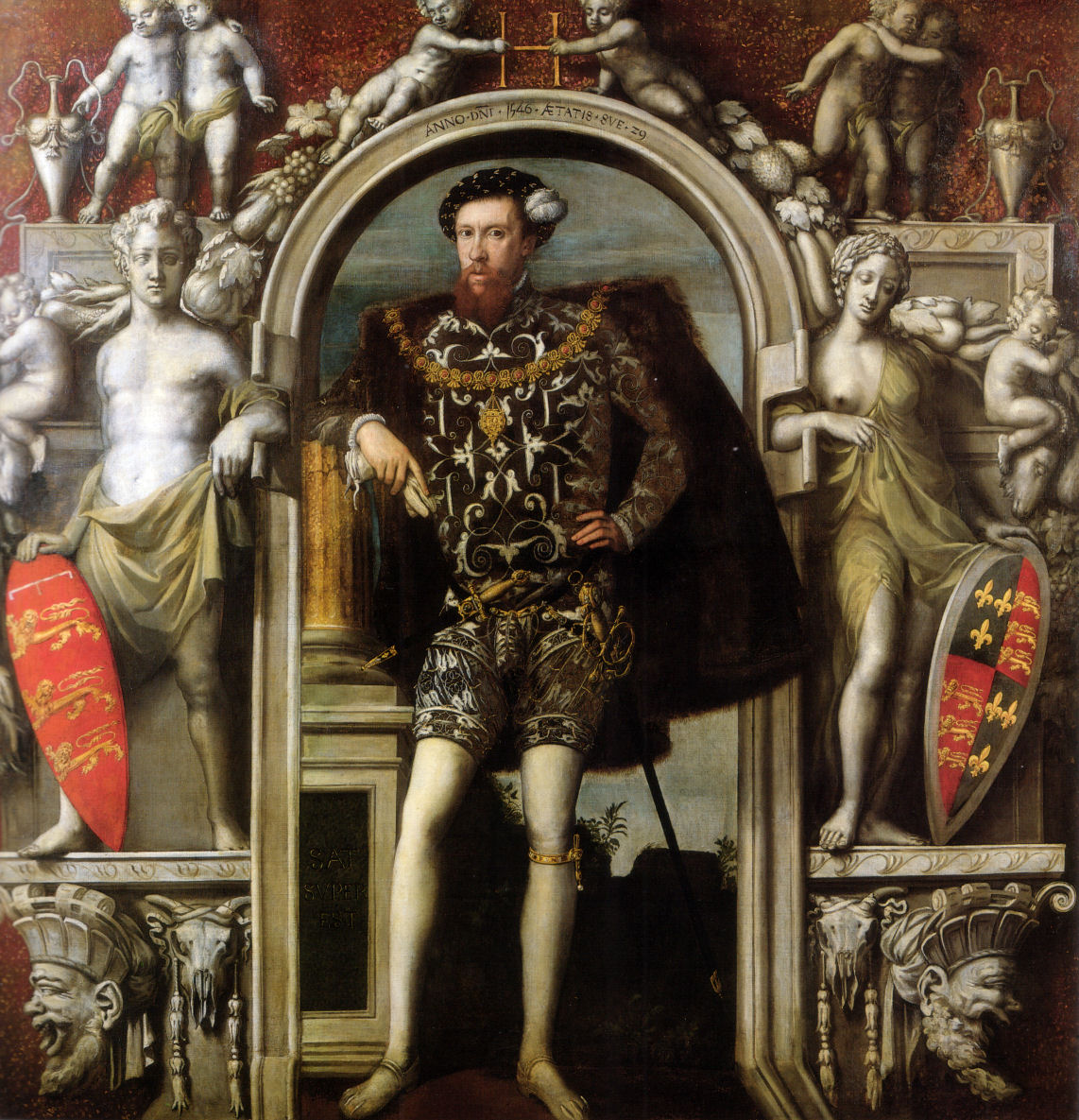
Henry Howard, Earl of Surrey, painted in 1546 by an unknown artist. Surrey was a friend and patron but Blagge alleged he was plotting treason at his trial on heraldic charges.

As with many minor member of the landed gentry, Blagge's early career consisted mainly of a search for patronage from a great man who might provide openings and opportunities for advancement. However, he was unfortunate in his choice of patrons, the two most important of whom were involved in fatal or near-fatal political entanglements.

Initially he attached himself to Sir Thomas Wyatt, a rising Kent landowner who was married to a cousin of Blagge. Wyatt was a few years older than Blagge and a client of Henry VIII's chief minister, Thomas Cromwell. Both a poet, though unpublished in his lifetime, and a diplomat, Wyatt was an important influence on Blagge, who sought to emulate his style and dabbled in poetry. It was almost certainly with Wyatt that Blagge travelled in France and Germany in 1535–36. Immediately after the death of Catherine of Aragon, during the genesis and outbreak of the Italian War of 1536–38, an English embassy was sent to Paris, apparently to negotiate a French alliance. The priest Thomas Runcorn, a close observer of Francis I's war preparations near Lyon, wrote to Blagge on 25 January 1536, commenting on the French king's health difficulties, and passing on his regards to both Wyatt and Sir Francis Bryan, the English ambassador.

There is no news since you left. They say that the king of France is making great preparations for war with the duke of Savoy, and war materials are brought here from Paris. Four days since he was so ill in the night that his thirst could not easily be quenched, and there is great danger of his having a relapse of the same complaint he had when you were here. This will be sad news both for us and his subjects. Perhaps it had better not be spoken of; therefore commit this letter to the flames, unless you wish to communicate it to Knevet, to whom, as to Wiot, give my best remembrance….Give my respects to dom. Brianus, to whom I would have written if I had anything worth communicating.

The letter was addressed to Blagge "in Aula," in the Palace, so Blagge, Wyatt and Sir Henry Knyvet were at this point with Bryan, as part of the embassy.

Wyatt narrowly escaped with his head in 1536, when he was one of those rumoured to have had intercourse with Anne Boleyn. However, Cromwell's protection allowed him to emerge as Henry's resident ambassador to Charles V, Holy Roman Emperor, in 1537, although his chances of high office in England were ruined. Blagge accompanied him to France and Spain, and acted as diplomatic courier for him in 1539, returning to England with his dispatches from Toledo in February. Blagge repaid his patron by standing witness for him when he was accused of diplomatic misconduct 1541. Wyatt died in the following year.

Blagge then attached himself to the Henry Howard, Earl of Surrey, a friend of Wyatt and a distinguished poet. Surrey was the son and heir of Thomas Howard, 3rd Duke of Norfolk, one of the most powerful magnates in the land. Blagge was the earl's senior by a few years and was not afraid to rebuke him for his erratic behaviour – a fact noted by Millicent Arundel, a witness before the Privy Council when, in March 1543, it investigated and punished Surrey's and Thomas Wyatt the Younger's rioting in London, which involved shooting in the streets as well as glass breaking. In July of that year English forces under Sir John Wallop were sent to support Imperial forces in defence of the Low Countries on the northern front of the Italian War of 1542–1546, moving out of the Pale of Calais. Blagge accompanied Surrey, taking 12 infantry from Kent on the expedition. He and Sir George Carew were nearly killed by sniper fire when they were inspecting a forward trench at the siege of Landrecies, a town occupied by the French early in the campaign. Both Surrey and Blagge gained considerable credit from their courage in the fighting. A letter of September 1543 from Sir Ralph Vane to Knyvet shows that Blagge was known by his comrades by the pet name Tom Trubbe. Blagge was again listed as part of the Kent contingent in 1544. His war service was probably a contributory factor when, on 11 March 1544, Blagge, the "King's servant," was granted the stewardship of the manor of Maidstone. However, the post had previously been held by his friend, Thomas Wyatt and the terms of the grant made clear that Blagge was appointed in his place.

At some point before 1547, probably through Surrey's influence and contacts, Blagge was made an esquire of the body, a member of the Privy Chamber of Henry VIII, who used to call him 'Pig'. This probably brought Blagge's quest for a patron to a conclusion, as he now had a position of considerable potential influence at the very heart of the royal household.

=== MP for Bedford ===
A measure of Blagge's progress was his election to Parliament to represent the borough of Bedford early in 1545. Both Bedford and Bedfordshire were dominated by a coterie of local gentry – notably the Mordaunts, the Gascoignes and the St. Johns. However, Sir Francis Bryan, who knew Blagge well from his diplomatic service alongside their mutual friend Wyatt, was influential in the borough and may already have been its recorder, as he certainly was in the next reign. A consummate political fixer and a close intimate of the king, Bryan is thought to have arranged the election of at least five members for Bedford. It is very likely that he arranged the election of both Blagge and Henry Parker, the other member elected in 1545. Parker was a long-standing servant of Bryan and was also, like Blagge, a member of the royal household. The parliament had been summoned on 1 December 1544 but did not assemble for its first session until almost a year later. Its deliberations were brief. When he was arrested in 1546, Blagge was an elected Member, but because Parliament was not in session, nor about to sit, according to the customs of the time he was not protected by parliamentary privilege.

== Heresy trial ==
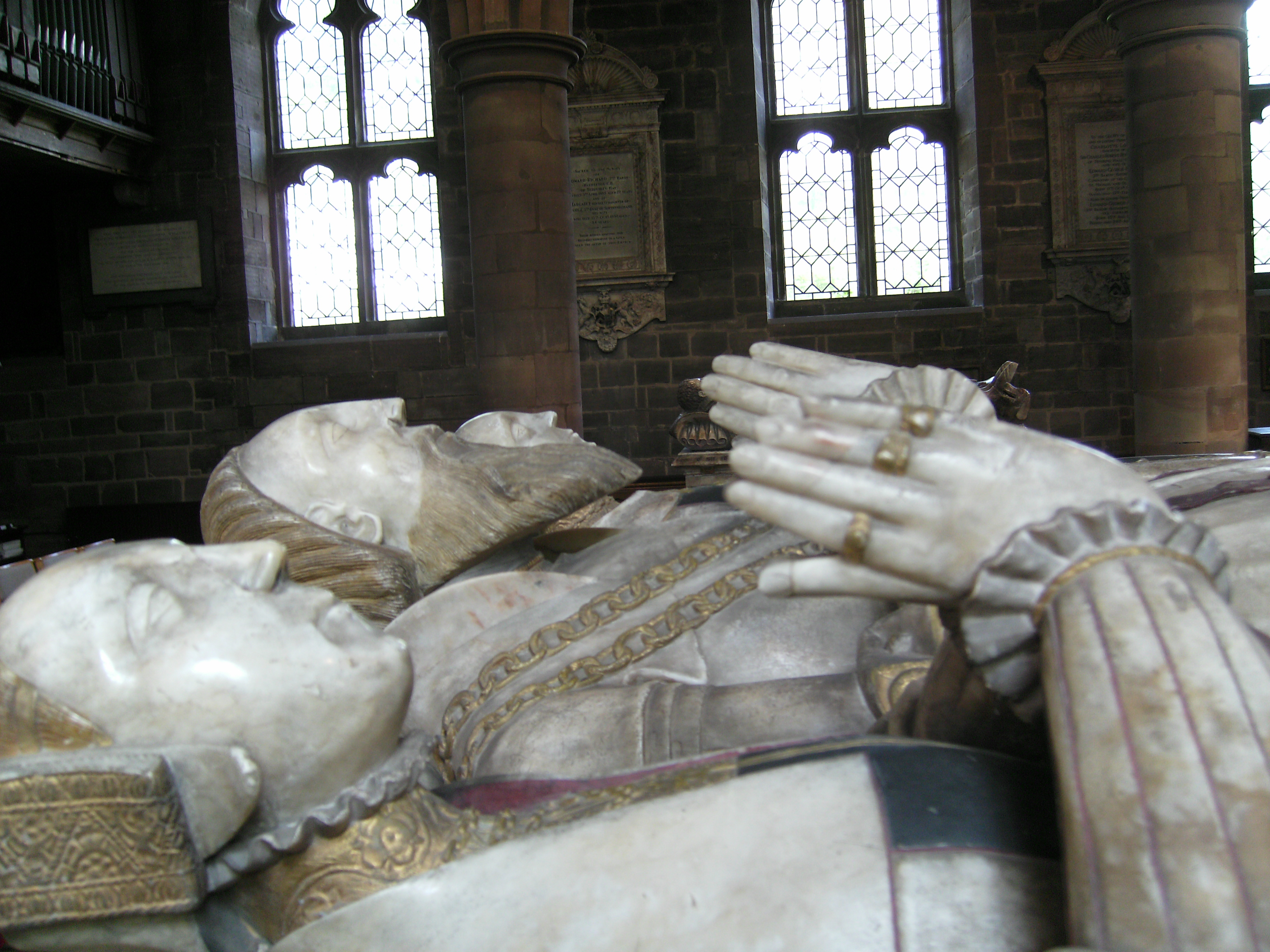
Tomb of Sir Edward Littleton and his wives, in Penkridge parish church, Staffordshire. Littleton was one of Blagge's accusers.

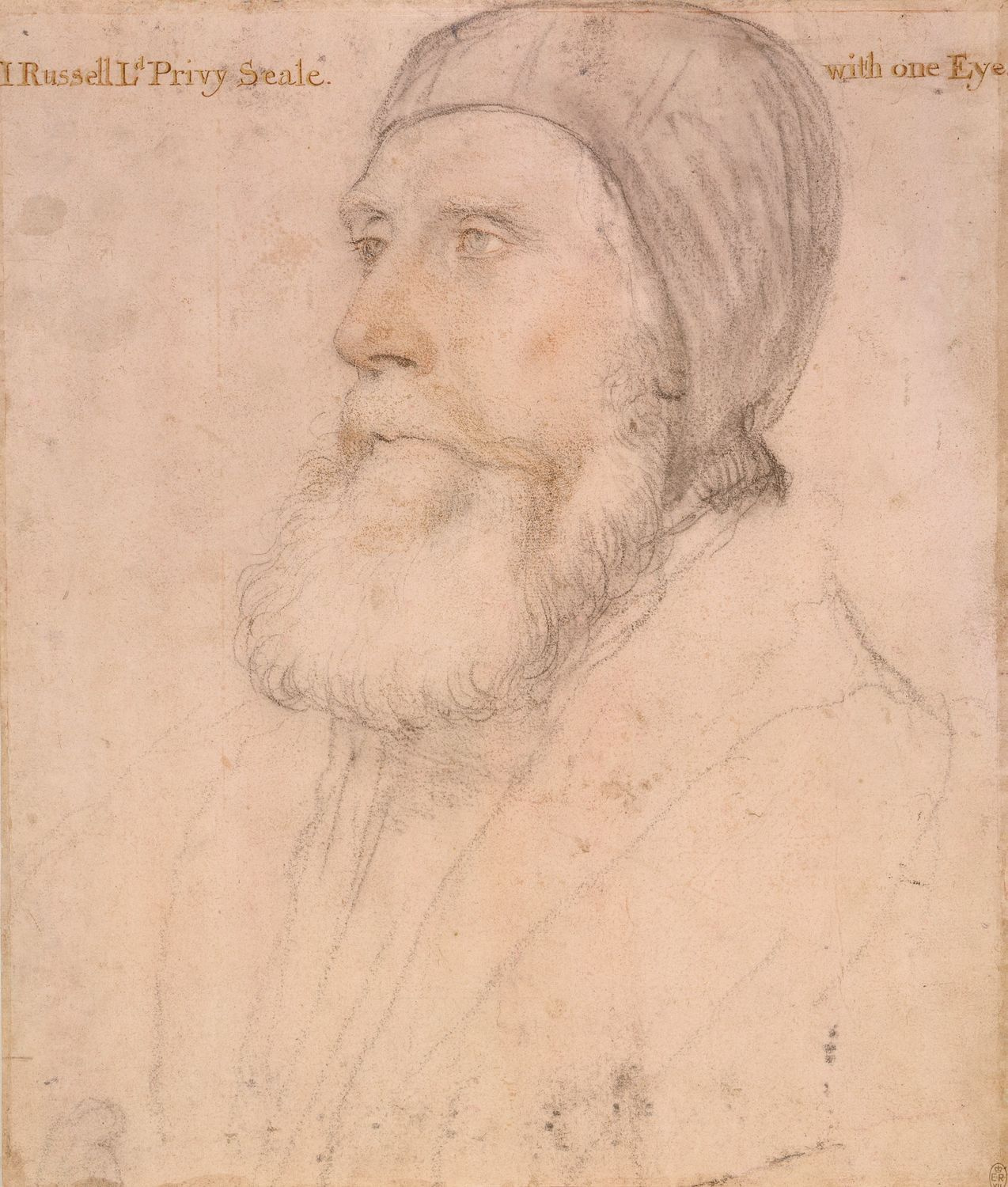
John Russell, 1st Earl of Bedford: a chalk drawing by Hans Holbein the Younger. According to Foxe, it was Russell who saved Blagge by alerting Henry VIII to his plight.

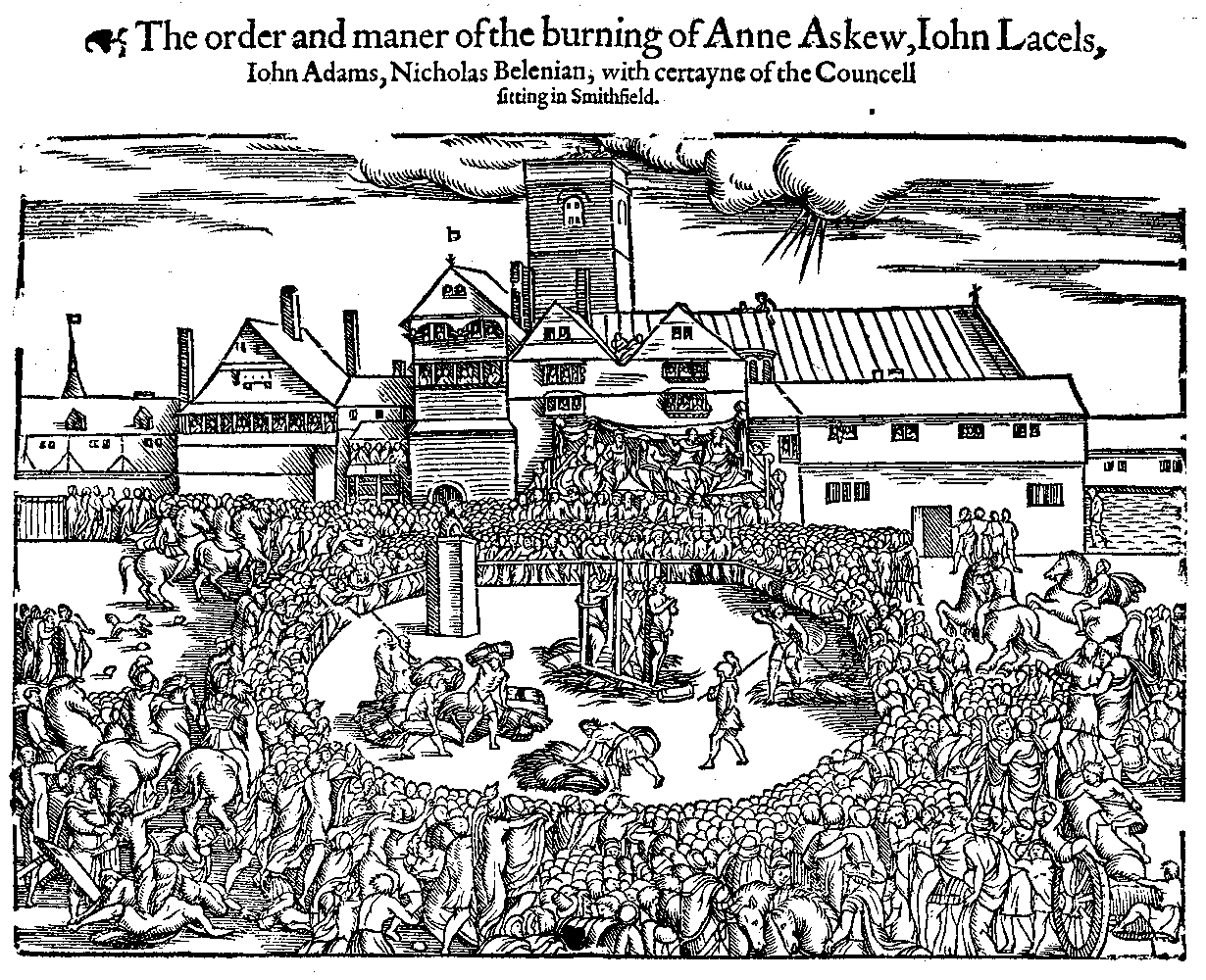
The burning of Anne Askew at Smithfield in 1546.

Towards the end of Henry VIII's reign, Blagge allegedly attracted attention because of his sacramentarian beliefs about the Lord's Supper, denying the Roman Catholic doctrine of transubstantiation. On 9 May 1546 Blagge was heard to deny the efficacy of the Mass, while walking home after church. According to the chronicle of Charles Wriothesley, who was a cousin of Thomas Wriothesley, the Lord Chancellor, Blagge's case was bundled together with those of two others accused of the same heresy and rushed through to trial.

The twelfe daie of Julie were arraigned at the Guildhall for Certaine heresy, John Hemley, priest, de Essex, John Lasell, gentleman, one of the sewers of the Kinges chamber, and Georg Blage, gentleman, a man of faire landes, which said persons that daie were first endited of heresie against the sacrament of the aulter, and ymediatlie arraygned on the same, the priest and Lasceles not denying the same their opinions but confessing them guiltie; and Mr. Blage abode the triall of twelve men, for he was sent for to my Lord Chauncelors but the night before, and this daie sent to Newgate not halfe an howre or he was brought to the hall, nor knew not wherfore he was taken, for he was never examyned before he came to his arraignemente...

In Blagge's Guildhall trial, the prosecution witnesses were Sir Edward Littleton of Pillaton Hall and Sir Hugh Calverley. Littleton, a former and future MP for Staffordshire, was a known religious conservative who had nevertheless done well from the Dissolution of the Monasteries. He was an abrasive, acquisitive figure, who had a talent for making enemies in high places and was considered over-mighty in his own county. Calverley, then the MP for Cheshire, had a long record of violence, poaching and rustling behind him, as well as before him. Notwithstanding the notoriety of his accusers, their testimony carried weight in this case. According to John Foxe:

The wordes whiche his accusers layd vnto hym, were these: What if a Mouse should eate the bread? then by my consent they should hang vp the Mouse. Where as in dede these woordes hee neuer spake, as to hys lyues end hee protested.

The account of his alleged words given in his pardon is substantially similar. Despite his claims that it was a misunderstanding or the result of a trick, Blagge was found guilty. He was sentenced to be burned for heresy the following Wednesday and sent to Newgate Prison.

The chronicle makes clear that the situation was desperate, as the entire case was overshadowed by that of Anne Askew, who was burnt for her sacramentarian beliefs after being prosecuted by Thomas Wriothesley.

The sixtenth of Julie was brent in Smythfielde John Lassells, gent., Anne Keme, alias Askewe, gentlewoman, John Hemley, priest, and John Hadlam, taylor, which fower persons were before condempned by the Kinges lawes of heresie against the sacrament of the alter….Maister Blage, White, and Shaxston had their pardons of the Kinges Majestie for landes, liffe, and goodes.

In Foxe's account, the distinction was that Blagge had friends in high places. The king had not heard of the proceedings until he heard whisperings among his household. John Russell, the Lord Privy Seal, then appealed to him on Blagge's behalf, and at that point Henry immediately issued a pardon, allowing Blagge to avoid execution, and ordered Wriothesley to release him. Blagge was then summoned by the king:

commyng after to the kynges presence: ah my pygge, sayth the kyng to hym (for so hee was wont to call hym). Yea sayd hee, if your Maiestie had not bene better to me then your Byshops were, your pygge had bene rosted ere this tyme.

Foxe implies that Blagge's narrow escape was down to an element of luck. The unfortunate Lassells was also well-connected but was nevertheless burnt.

Like Charles Wriothesley, Foxe sets the drama against the backdrop of Anne Askew's sensational trial and execution to make clear that the threat to Blagge was real enough. However, Blagge not only escaped but probably benefitted from the additional royal attention. On 13 November 1546 he was appointed to the lucrative post of comptroller of the petty custom in the port of London.

It is unclear whether Blagge actually held the sacramentarian views attributed to him, and, if so, when and how he moved to an evangelical position. It is likely that it was at about this time that he married Dorothy Badby: the marriage is known to have occurred by 1548 and Blagge's children were still very young when he died in 1551. It is possible that this marked an important turn in his religious thinking. Dorothy remarried twice into radically Protestant families after 1551 and their son Henry grew up an outspoken Puritan. However, the words imputed to him at his trial seem little more than a couple of weak jokes – one, which he denied uttering, raising the implications of a mouse nibbling the consecrated Host. Foxe's point in including Blagge among his martyrs seems to be not that he was a Protestant hero, but that life was unsafe for everyone under Wriothesley's persecution. Hence Foxe presents his brief account of Blagge's trial as a light intermission in his tale of Anne Askew, a genuine Protestant martyr.

== Later career ==
=== Religious and political polarisation ===
However, Blagge soon became seen as a spokesman for the Protestant cause because of a series of court appearances. The first of these was in the heraldic trial of Surrey in January 1547. The earl was accused of appropriating royal insignia, specifically the arms of St Edward the Confessor. This was presented as symbolic of his designs on power. Norfolk was a stalwart religious conservative and had also been arrested on similar charges. The king had become convinced, or had convinced himself, that there was a wide-ranging Catholic plot to put the Howards in power, and this played well with the previously hard-pressed Evangelical faction at court – focussed on Queen Catherine Parr and the Seymours, the uncles of Henry's young son and heir Edward.

In court, Blagge averred that Surrey had often boasted of the power the Howards would wield after Henry's death, when Edward would require a regency. An altercation between Blagge and Surrey on the matter was attested in the deposition of Edward Rogers, who recalled that he had been told of it in the Spring of 1545. According to Rogers, Blagge had

related how he had said to the Earl of Surrey that he thought that such as the King should specially appoint thereto should be meetest to rule the Prince in the event of the King's death. The Earl on the contrary held that his father was meetest, both for good services done and for estate. Blage replied that then the Prince should be but evil taught; and, in multiplying words, said "Rather than it should come to pass that the Prince should be under the government of your father or you, I would bide the adventure to thrust this dagger in you." The Earl said he was very hasty, and that God sent a shrewd cow short horns. "Yea, my lord (quod Blage), and I trust your horns also shall be kept so short as ye shall not be able to do any hurt with them." Afterwards the Earl, who at the time had no weapon, took sword and dagger and went to Blage's house "and said unto him, that of late he had been very hasty with him"; but what passed further Deponent does not remember.

Blagge was one of more than twenty witnesses marshalled by the king to convict Surrey, who was executed later in the month. Norfolk, his father, only escaped the block because Henry VIII died early on the day scheduled for his execution. Surrey was not much of a politician and even less of a Catholic zealot: his imprisonment in 1543 was partly for failing to keep the fast in Lent. Blagge lent himself, whether from conviction or from convenience, to the idea that there was a conspiracy to deny the Evangelicals a predominance in the next reign and his evidence seemed the more valuable because he could be seen as a victim of it. It is unclear whether this contest for power was a reality or an ex post facto construct.

Surrey addressed his old friend in one of his last works, a paraphrase of Psalm 73:

But now, my BLAGE, my error well I see;
Such goodly light king David giveth me.

The name Blage has replaced the word blame in earlier editions of the poem.

=== Supporting the régime ===
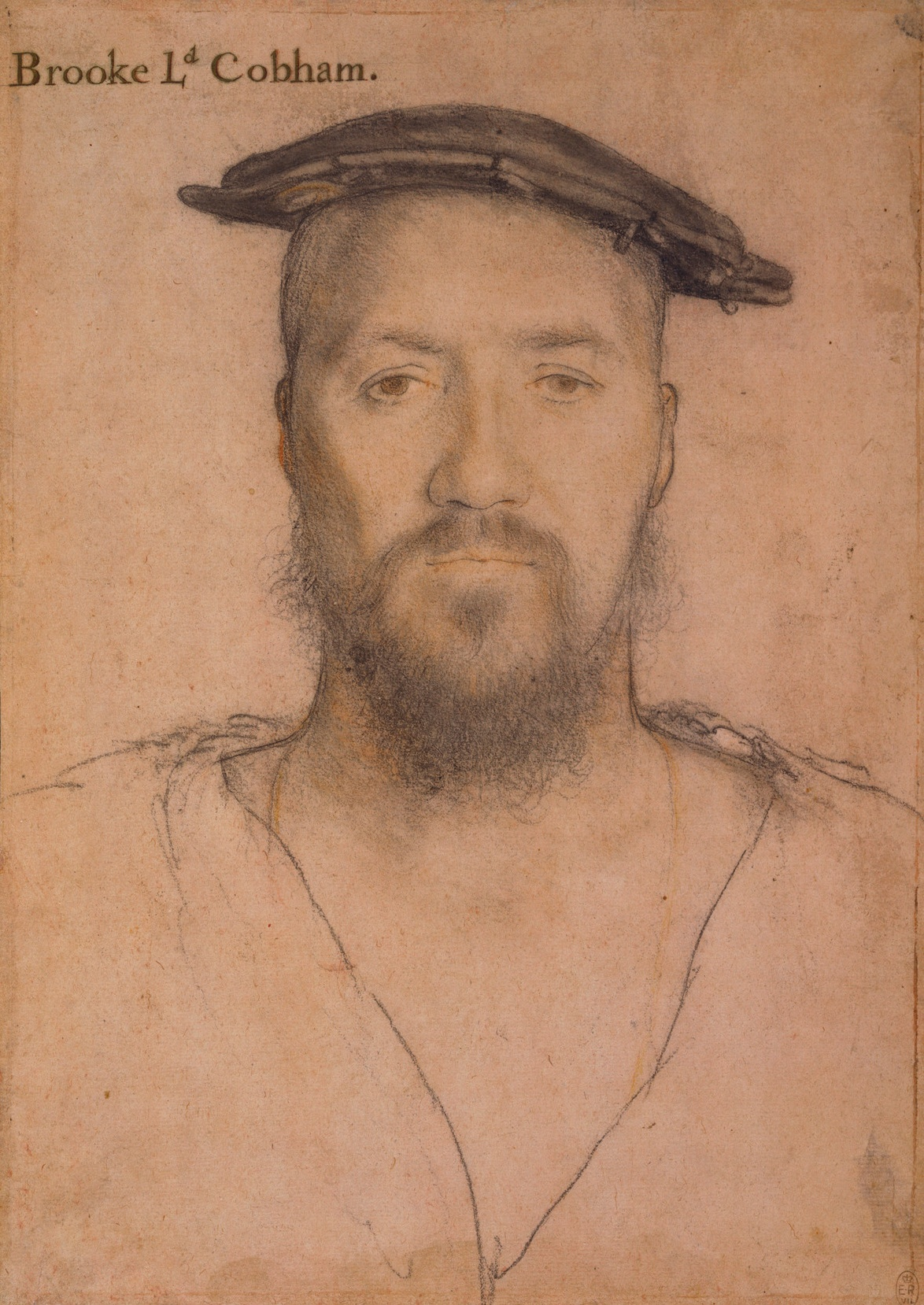
George Brooke, 9th Baron Cobham, Blagge's cousin.

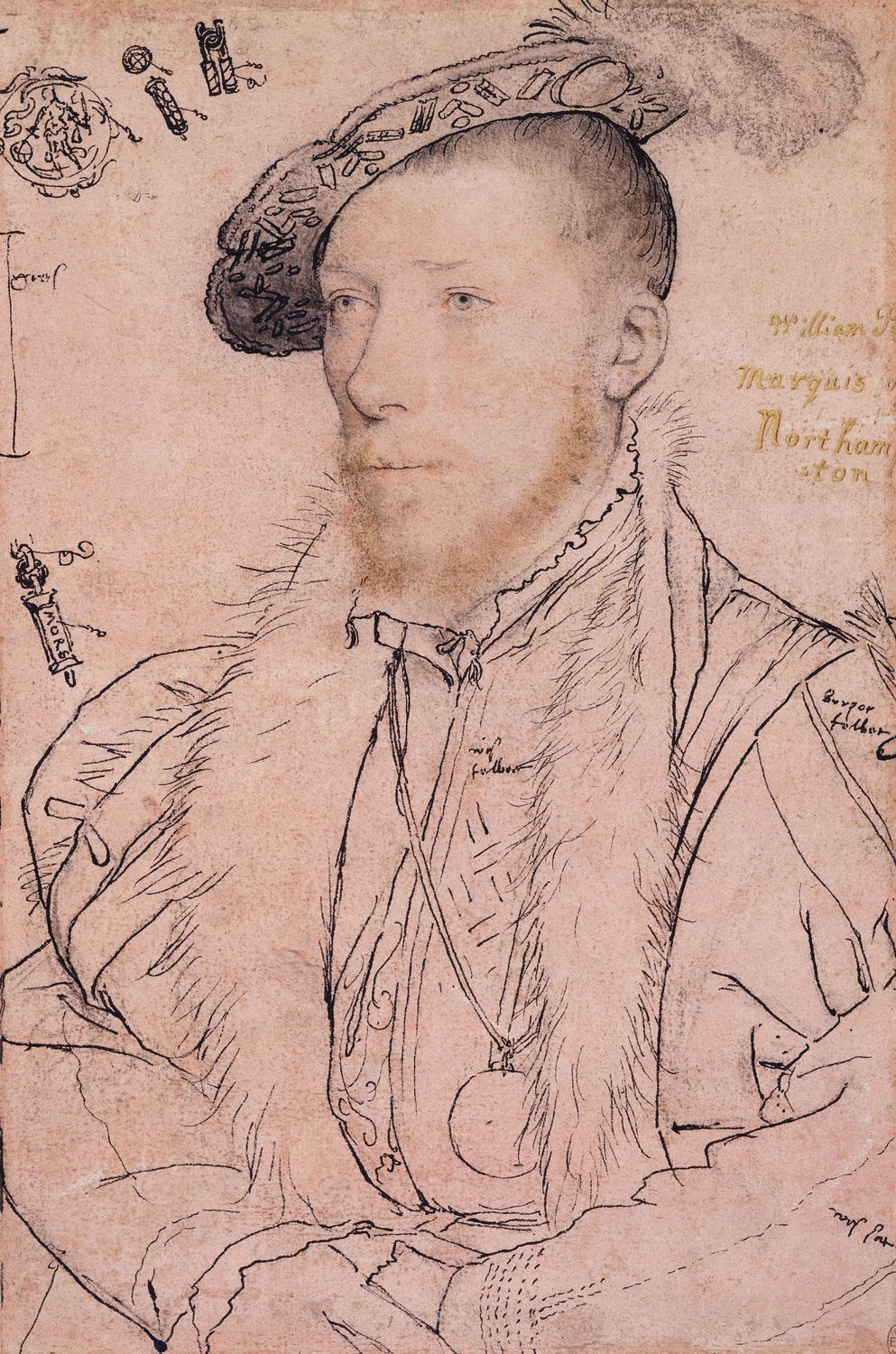
William Parr.

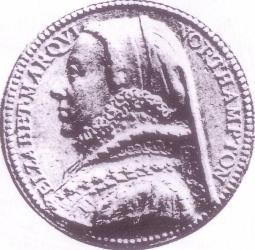
A medallion of Elizabeth Brooke or Cobham.

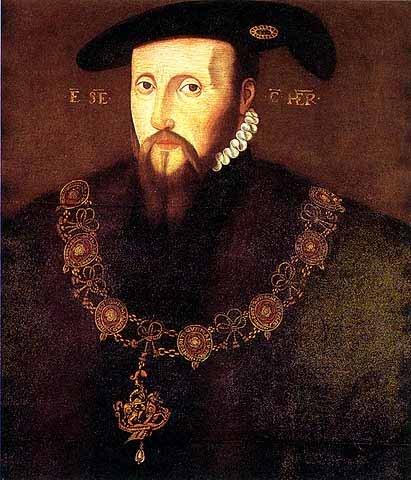
Edward Seymour, the Lord Protector in the early years of Edward VI's reign.

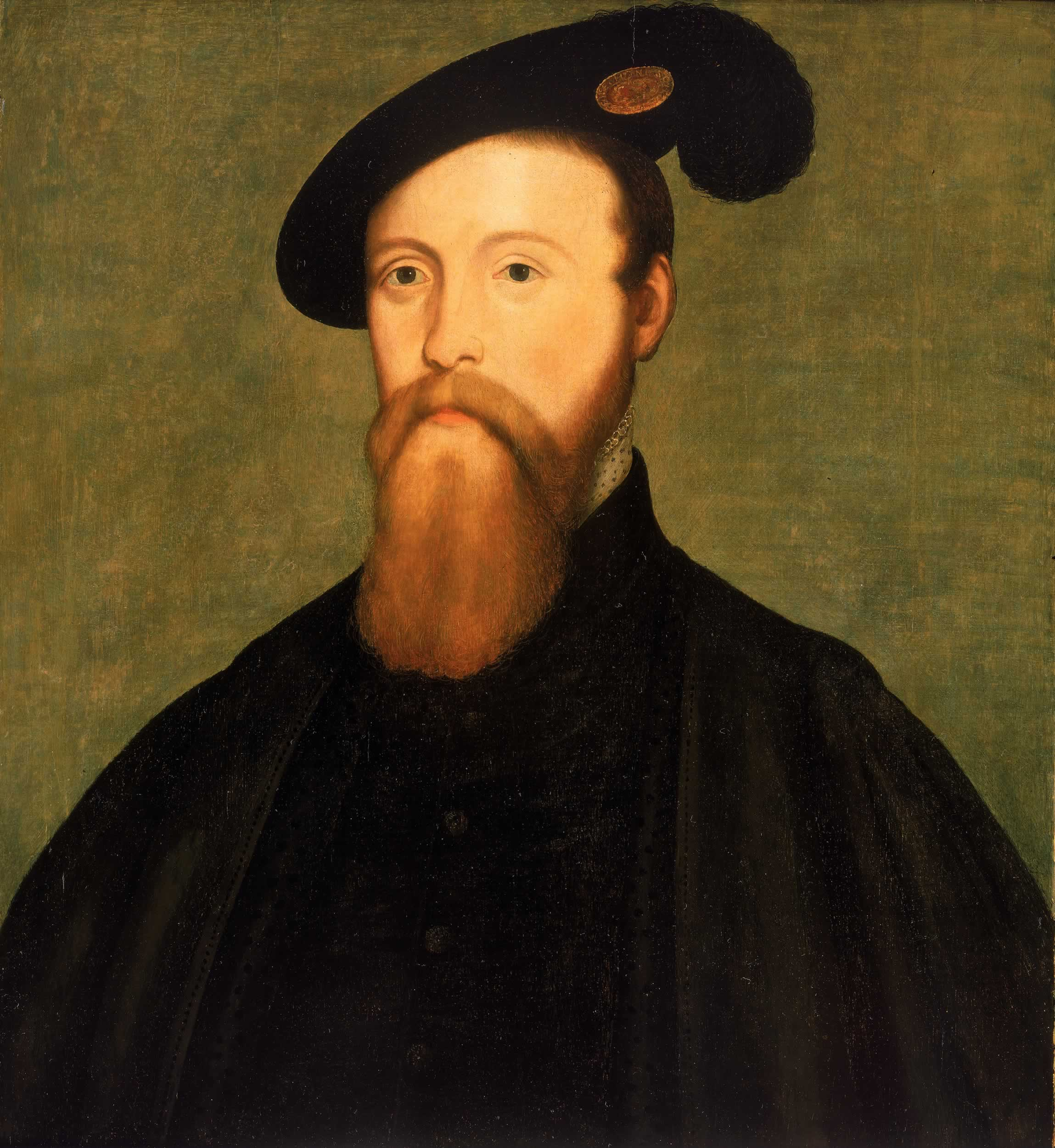
Thomas Seymour, Lord Admiral by Nicholas Denizot.

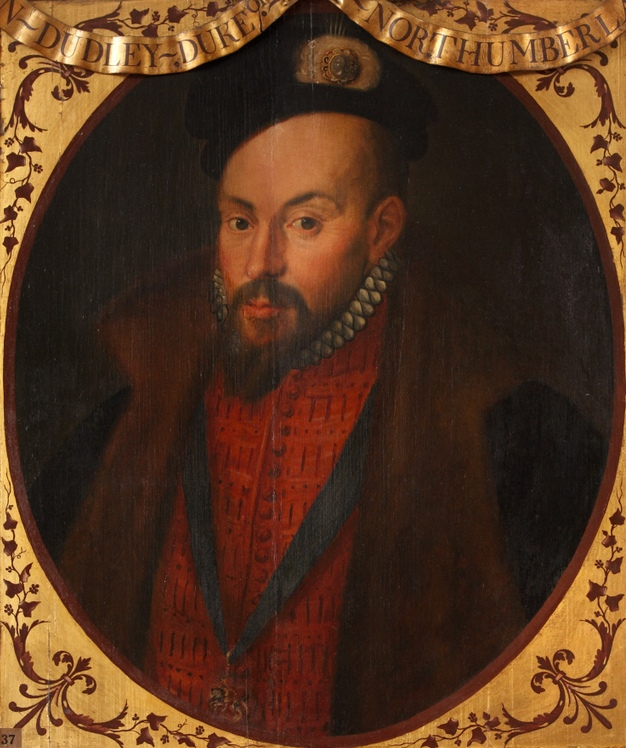
The elder John Dudley, Earl of Warwick

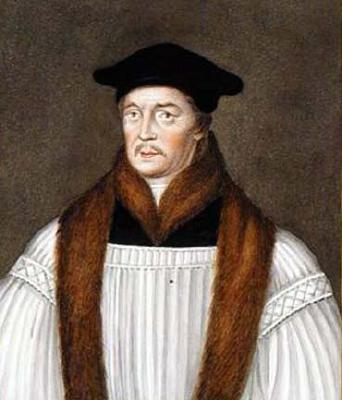
Stephen Gardiner, Bishop of Winchester, by an unknown artist. Blagge testified how Gardiner had defended the doctrine of transubstantiation from the pulpit after the Church of England adopted a sacramentarian position.

Blagge's trials and testimonies made him well-adapted to prosper under the regency régime that followed the death of Henry VIII on 28 January 1547. In 1547, for the first time, he was appointed justice of the peace in his home county of Kent.

=== The Parr marriage ===
At some point in the same year he stood alongside the mainstays of the régime, as well as performing a service for his own relatives, by acting as feoffee in an important property transfer. George Brooke, 9th Baron Cobham, was Blagge's cousin and his daughter, Elizabeth, was in an intimate relationship with William Parr, 1st Marquess of Northampton, Catherine Parr's brother, who was already married to the still-living Anne Bourchier, 7th Baroness Bourchier. Anne had deserted him and he had legally repudiated her. However, whether Elizabeth was considered a mistress, bigamist or wife was subject to the shifting theological preferences of successive reigns. In 1547 Parr transferred to Elizabeth a large portfolio of lands in the north-west of England, which was to return to Parr or his heirs in the event of her death: a dower or jointure settlement which strongly affirmed their marriage, although Elizabeth marital status is not mentioned in the patent, which cost £113 6s. 8d. She is simply Elizabeth Cobham, daughter of George Brooke. The list of feoffees is formidable, headed by Edward Seymour, 1st Duke of Somerset, the Lord Protector himself, and Archbishop Thomas Cranmer. Blagge was listed among them, alongside his business partner, Richard Goodrich – a mark of his loyalty and value to the regency.

=== Military exploits ===
Blagge was joint commissioner for the musters for the Scottish campaign of that year, with Sir John Holcroft, a Lancashire landowner. This was a part of the war known as the Rough Wooing that culminated in the Battle of Pinkie Cleugh on 10 September. It seems likely that Blagge served throughout and he must have impressed Protector Somerset, who knighted him at Roxburgh, returning from the victorious campaign, between 18 and 25 September 1547.

=== MP for Westminster ===
It was perhaps the support of Somerset that secured Blagge one of the Westminster borough seats in the Parliament that assembled in November 1547. However, Westminster had only recently acquired the right to representation and was initially dominated by the short-lived Diocese of Westminster. MPs in the early decades were almost all local property owners and many were connected with the court or the administration. Blagge fits this brief, as does his colleague in that parliament, John Rede. Probably both had local leverage of their own.

The parliament lasted for most of Edward VI's reign, outliving many of its members, including Blagge. After his death, his seat was taken by Robert Nowell, a young lawyer and a client of William Cecil.

=== The fall of Thomas Seymour ===
Blagge was a faithful supporter of the successive regency regimes. In 1548 he was called upon to testify against Thomas Seymour, 1st Baron Seymour of Sudeley, the Lord High Admiral of England and husband of Catherine Parr, Henry VIII's widow. Thomas was accused of promoting legislation to limit his brother Edward's powers as Protector. Blagge stated in evidence:

The Lord Admiral ... said unto me, ‘Here is gear shall come amongst you, my masters of the Nether House, shortly’. ‘What is that, my Lord?’ said I. ‘Marry’, said he, ‘requests to have the King better ordered, and not kept close that no man may see him’, and so entered with sundry mislikings of my Lord Protector’s proceedings touching the bringing up of the King’s Majesty ... I said, ‘Who shall put this into the House?’ ‘Myself’, said he. ‘Why then’, said I, ‘you make no longer reckoning of your brother’s friendship if you propose to go this way to work’.

Although his downfall was postponed, the Admiral's own rashness led him to attainder and execution in the following year, some months after Catherine Parr's death after childbirth. Blagge and John Dudley, 2nd Earl of Warwick, made depositions in relation to the attainder in January 1549, alleging that Thomas Seymour had threatened to stab anyone who attempted to arrest him. At some point Blagge seems to have transferred his loyalty to Warwick.

=== Rewards and responsibilities ===
Early in 1550, after the fall of Protector Somerset and the coming to power of Warwick, Blagge began to gather tangible rewards for his continuing loyalty to the Protestant order.

On 8 February 1550 Blagge received a large and varied portfolio of property, from a number of former ecclesiastical owners, mainly in Kent. The grant was made explicitly in recognition of Blagge's service in both war and peace to Henry VIII, although to secure it he had to pay £316 16s. 3d. at the Court of Augmentations. He was evidently forced to draw on funds from a friend to do so, as the grant was made jointly to himself and Richard Goodrich, who was later to marry his widow. It consisted largely of the endowments of two chantries. One was that of St Mary at Dartford. The other was at the College of All Saints, Maidstone. Maidstone college itself had been dissolved in one of the first acts of the new Protestant government and it was granted on 10 May 1549 to George Brooke, 9th Baron Cobham, Blagge's cousin. The properties granted to Blagge were extensive but fragmented, including farms, woods, pasture and marsh. Beyond Kent, there was also a brewery called the "Bolte and Tunne" in Fleet Street that had previously belonged to the Carmelites of Whitefriars, London: like most of the other properties, however, it had sitting tenants, whose interests were protected.

On 22 April that year Blagge acquired a lease on new home. For £68 2s. 2d. per year the Court of Augmentations granted him Great Stanmore, starting from the following Michaelmas. Since 1354 there had been a manor called Great Stanmore, the property of St Alban's Abbey. After the dissolution of the monasteries the estate had been granted to Geoffrey Chamber, who worked for the Court of Augmentations, and then in January 1547 to Sir Pedro Gamboa, a Spanish soldier in the service of the English government. Blagge's opportunity to lease Great Stanmore occurred because Gamboa was assassinated, alongside a comrade, in London on 19 January 1550.

When the manor of Maidstone was granted to Robert Wyatt the Younger on 13 June 1550, as part of a general disposal of former ecclesiastical property, Blagge's interests were scrupulously protected. His wages as steward, including arrears, were specifically earmarked in the grant.

In 1551 Blagge was appointed a commissioner for the relief for both Kent and Middlesex, one of those responsible for ensuring this archaic due, which still formed an important part of the English fiscal system, was collected in full.

=== Testimony against Gardiner ===
Blagge was called upon to give evidence in proceedings against Stephen Gardiner, the bishop of Winchester and formerly Henry VIII's secretary and his chief adviser during the persecution of Protestants in the mid-1540s. He was able to testify that he had been offended by one of the bishop's sermons attacking the sacramentarian position some three years earlier – an ironic commentary on his own earlier troubles. However, he was careful in what he alleged, refusing to go beyond his admittedly hazy memory of events.

he sayeth that he was present at the Sermon made on saynt Peters daye, in the second yere of the reigne of kyng Edward the sixt (29 June 1548), at whiche tyme this deponent harde the sayde byshop preache vpon the Sacrament, and the masse: wherewith this deponent, and dyuerse other (as he sayeth) were then offended. But what specially the byshop spake of the Sacramēt and the masse, this deponent doth not nowe certainly remember.

== Poet ==
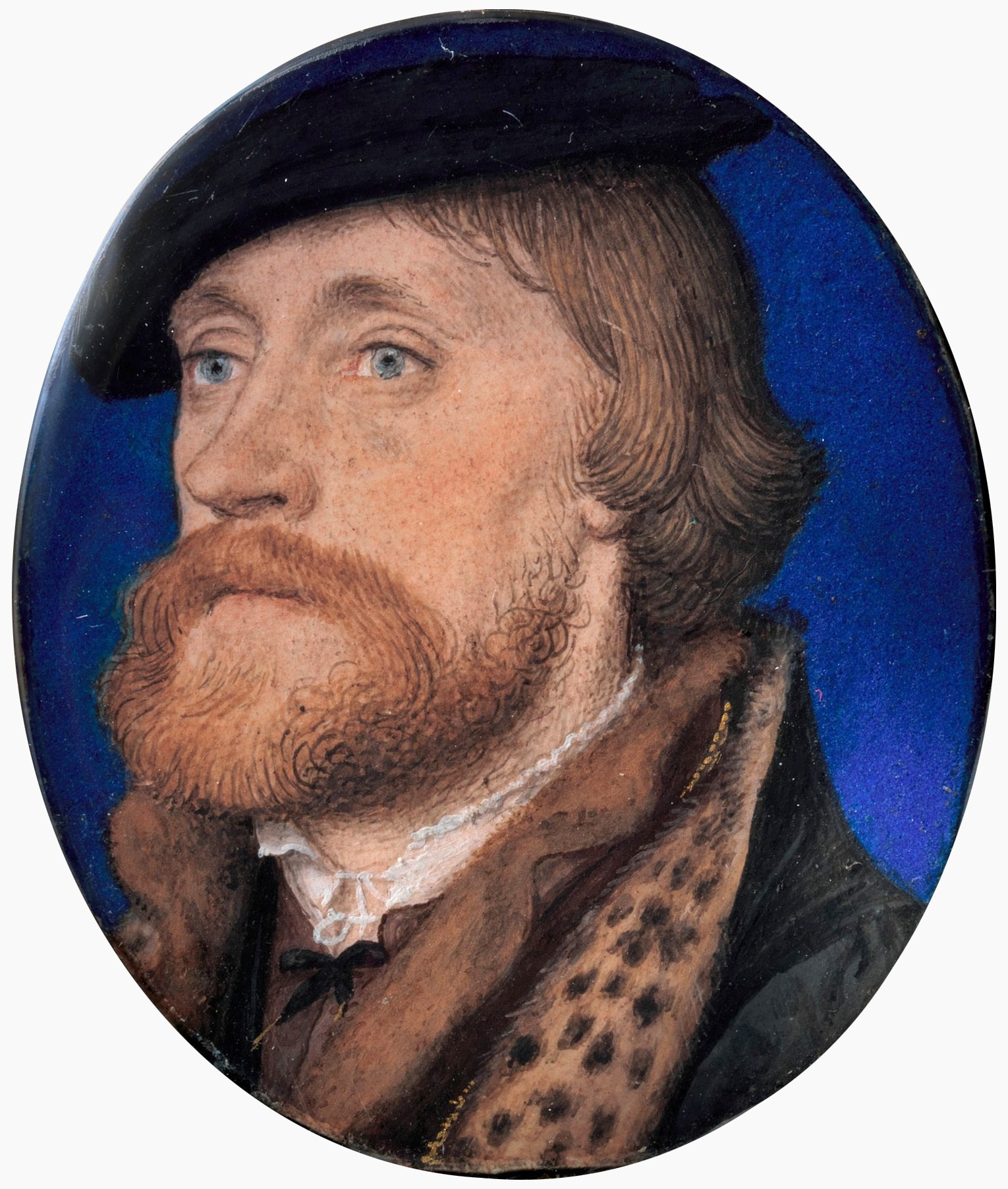
Thomas Wriothesley, 1st Earl of Southampton, a portrait probably after Hans Holbein the Younger. Wriothesley trimmed to please the prevailing regime, whatever its religious complexion. He condemned Blagge to death for heresy and was the target of his most savage verse.

Blagge belonged to a circle of poets but his own poetry is considered poor. His output was probably considerable but only about six poems survive, mainly on political themes. They include verse on Catherine Parr and Jane Seymour, although the best known is a mordant epitaph for Wriothesley:

Picture of pride; of papistry the plat:
In whom Treason, as in a throne did sit;
With ireful eye, aye glearing like a cat,
Killing by spite whom he thought good to hit.
This dog is dead ...

Blagge's most important contribution to English poetry was his habit of collecting his friends' poems. The result was the famous Blage manuscript, now MS D.2.7 in the library of Trinity College, Dublin. Rediscovered only in the 1960s, it widened the known oeuvre of Thomas Wyatt and his circle, although it overlaps considerably with another collection, the Devonshire manuscript.

== Death ==
George Blagge died on 17 June 1551 at his manor of Great Stanmore. The final outbreak of the mysterious disease known as sweating sickness was raging and there were many victims in the court. Blagge was probably one of them. He had neglected to make a will, suggesting a sudden onset of illness. He left his two-year-old son, Henry, as his heir.

Following Blagge's death, he was replaced by Henry Gate as comptroller of petty custom as early as 27 June 1551. A further, but rather late, trace of his death in official records was the issue of a writ of diem clausit extremum to the escheator of Kent on 3 December 1551.

== Personal life ==
=== Marriage ===
Blagge married Dorothy Badby or Badbye, who was probably considerably younger and outlived him by several decades: she was still alive in 1578. Dorothy was the daughter of William Badby of Essex, a landowner who had been known to speculate in former monastic properties. She was a maid of honour to Catherine of Aragon before she married Blagge. She and Blagge are known to have had three children: a son and two daughters.

After Blagge's death, Dorothy married Richard Goodrich (also Goodricke) of Bolingbroke, formerly three times MP for Great Grimsby. Goodrich was a staunch Protestant and an eminent Gray's Inn lawyer, active in drafting ecclesiastical reforms under Edward VI, and he had taken part with Blagge in proceedings against Bishop Gardiner. He had been married to Mary Blagge or Blage or Blake but had obtained a divorce and separation from her. During the reign of Mary I, in a case she took action for the restitution of her conjugal rights and dowry, the latter case being heard by Gardiner in the Court of Chancery. Dorothy had two further children with Goodrich: Richard and Elizabeth. He died in 1562.

Dorothy then married Sir Ambrose Jermyn, an elderly, wealthy landowner and courtier of Rushbrooke, Suffolk, another staunch Protestant. He already had a large family by his first wife, Anne, but Dorothy bore Sir Ambrose a further daughter, Dorothy. Two of her children by Blagge, and one by Goodrich, married children of Sir Ambrose – a common arrangement among Elizabethan gentry. Sir Ambrose died in 1577, but his wife is known to have outlived him

=== Children ===
George Blagge and Dorothy Badby had the following issue:

- Henry Blagge, born about 1549, a Puritan MP for Sudbury in the 1580s. He married his step-sister Hester Jermyn. He inherited land from the Jermyns and the site of Bury St Edmunds Abbey from the Badby family, as well as his father's lands.

- Ambrose Blagge, their son, was the father of the Royalist Civil War commander Colonel Thomas Blagge.

- Judith Blagge, who married Sir Robert Jermyn, the eldest son and heir of Sir Ambrose, a radical Puritan politician.

- Sir Thomas Jermyn, their eldest son, also an active politician, nevertheless supported Charles I in his conflict with parliament and lost large sums of money by making loans to him.
- Susan, their youngest daughter, married Sir William Hervey, a more neutral politician. They became ancestors of the Marquesses of Bristol, who retain the title Earl Jermyn.

- Hester Blagge, who married Charles Le Grice of Brockdish.
