= Edward Griffin (MP) =

English politician

Sir Edward Griffin (1587 – 5 May 1681) was an English politician who sat in the House of Commons from 1640 to 1644.

Griffin was the son of Sir Edward Griffin of Dingley and Gumley Ewing, Northamptonshire.

He matriculated at Exeter College, Oxford on 16 October 1601, at the age of14. He was a student of the Middle Temple in 1604. He was knighted on 20 May 1625.

King James and Anne of Denmark came from Kirby Hall and visited him at Braybrooke Castle on 12 August 1605. King James knighted him at Grafton on 19 August 1608.

He gained the estates of his older brother, Sir Thomas Griffin, on his death in 1615. Thomas Griffin had married Catherine Morton, daughter of Sir John Morton, and secondly, Elizabeth Touchet, a daughter of George Touchet, Lord Audley, but had no male heir.

His first wife was Lucy. He married secondly Frances Uvedale, a daughter of William Uvedale.

His wife, or his brother's widow, Lady Griffin, attended the funeral of Anne of Denmark in 1619 as a lady of the Privy Chamber.

In April 1640, Griffin was elected member of parliament for Downton in the Short Parliament. He was re-elected MP for Downton in the Long Parliament and sat until he was disabled on 5 February 1644.

Following the Restoration, Griffin was Treasurer of the Chamber from 1660 to 1679. He was succeeded in that office by his son Edward, who was raised to the peerage as Baron Griffin of Braybrooke in 1688.

Griffin is said to have died in 1681 at an advanced age.

Parliament of England
Vacant Parliament suspended since 1629	Member of Parliament for Downton; 1640–1644; With: William Eyre 1640; Sir Anthony Ashley Cooper 1640–1644	Succeeded by Alexander Thistlethwaite
