= Elizabeth Chamber =

English courtier

- Baroness St John of Bletso
- Died: After 8 December 1602; Warwickshire
- Noble family: Chamber (by birth); St John (by marriage)
- Spouses: Sir Walter Stonor; Reginald Conyers; Edward Griffin; Oliver St John, 1st Baron St John of Bletso
- Father: Geoffrey Chamber
- Occupation: Lady-in-waiting and Mother of the Maids

Elizabeth Chamber, better known as Elizabeth Stonor (died after 8 December 1602), was an English courtier. She is remembered as the wife of Sir Walter Stonor, and was one of the women chosen to serve Anne Boleyn, the King's second wife, during her imprisonment in 1536.

== Life ==
She was the daughter of Geoffrey Chamber of Stanmore, Middlesex and married successively, Sir Walter Stonor, Reginald Conyers, Edward Griffin and Oliver St John, 1st Baron St John of Bletso.

She was a lady-in-waiting to each of Henry VIII of England's six wives, and was the Mother of the Maids, with responsibility for the conduct of the young maids of honour.

In May 1536, five women were appointed to serve Anne Boleyn while she was imprisoned in the Tower and to report to Sir William Kingston, the Lieutenant of the Tower, and through him to the King's chief minister, Thomas Cromwell, all that the Queen said. These women included Elizabeth Stonor; Anne Boleyn's aunt, Anne Boleyn, Lady Shelton; Elizabeth Wood, Lady Boleyn, the Queen's aunt by marriage; Mary Kingston, the wife of Sir William Kingston, the Lieutenant of the Tower; and Margaret Coffin, the wife of Anne Boleyn's Master of the Horse, Sir William Coffin. Sir William Kingston described the five as "honest and good women", but Anne Boleyn said that it was "a great unkindness in the King to set such about me as I have never loved".

== Marriages ==
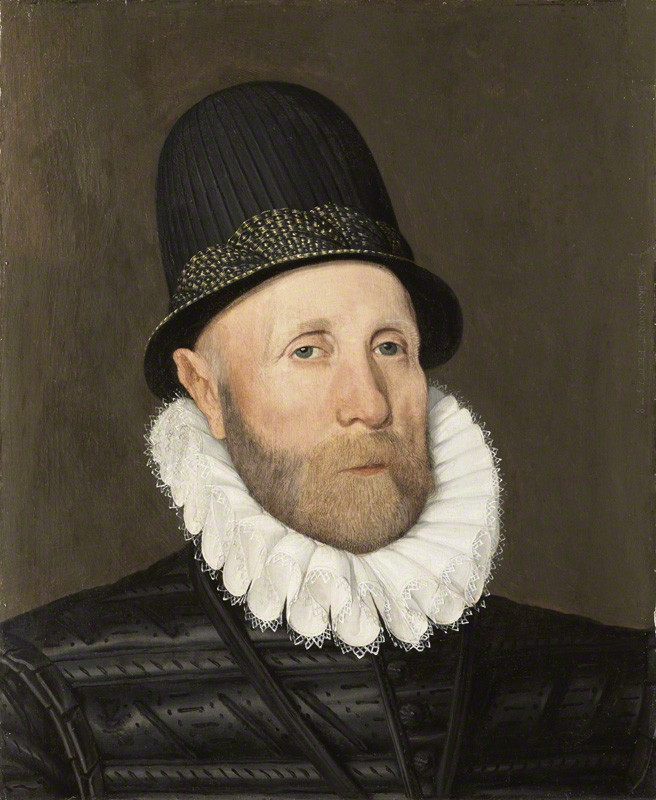
Elizabeth Chamber's 4th husband was Oliver St John, (by Arnold Bronckorst)

Elizabeth was married four times:

- Sir Walter Stonor (died 1551), Lieutenant of the Tower of London
- Reginald Conyers (died 1560)
- Edward Griffin of Dingley (died 1569), Attorney General
- She married, before 28 August 1572, Oliver St John, 1st Baron St John of Bletso (died 21 April 1582)
