= Walter Stonor =

English knight

Sir Walter Stonor Kt
- Arms of Stonor of North Stoke, Oxfordshire: Azure two bars dancetté or, a chief argent
- Born: Walter Stoner
- Died: 1551
- Title: Lieutenant of the Tower of London
- Term: 29 September 1546–1547
- Predecessor: Sir Anthony Knyvett
- Successor: Sir John Markham
- Spouse(s): Anne Foliot; Elizabeth Chamber
- Children: Elizabeth Stonor
- Parent(s): Thomas Stonor; Sybilla Brecknock

Sir Walter Stonor (died 1551) was the son of Thomas Stoner of North Stoke, Oxfordshire and Sybilla, the daughter of Sir David Brecknock. He was a Knight of the Body and appointed Lieutenant of the Tower of London on 29 September 1546. He had at least three probable brothers, John, Edmund and Robert. He was knighted by Thomas Howard, then Earl of Surrey, after the Battle of Flodden in 1513. He died in 1551 with no male heir.

== Marriage and issue ==
Stonor first married Anne, the daughter of John Foliot of Worcestershire and Eleanor Moore, and had his first son and a daughter by her:

- John Stoner died without issue.
- Elizabeth Stonor (born c. 1500) married firstly, Sir William Compton, secondly Walter Walshe and finally, before 1540, Sir Philip Hoby.

Second, he married Elizabeth by 1533, the daughter of Geoffrey Chamber of Stanmore, Middlesex. After her husband's death, she married successively, Reginald Conyers (d. 1560), Edward Griffin (d. 1569) and Oliver St John, 1st Baron St John of Bletso.

He corresponded with his daughter, Elizabeth, for several decades after her marriages to Sir William Compton, Walter Walshe and Sir Philip Hoby, and unusually for the period these letters have survived, giving an indication of their relationship over the years.
