= Thomas Griffin (died 1615) =

English landowner

Sir Thomas Griffin (1580 – 1615) was an English landowner and hosted the royal family at Dingley.

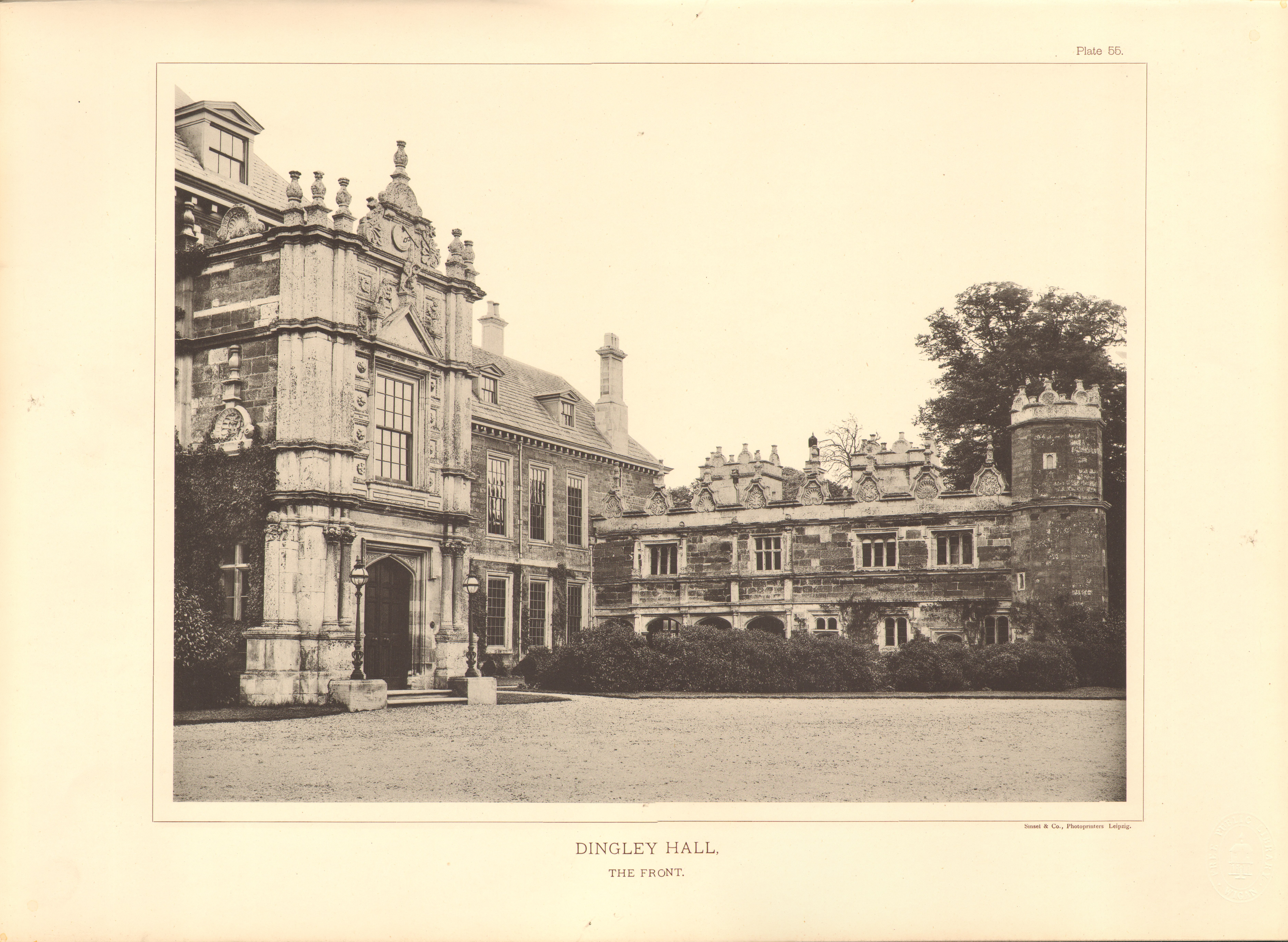
Dingley Hall where Griffin hosted Anna of Denmark

Thomas Griffin was the eldest son of Sir Edward Griffin (d. 1620) of Dingley, Braybrooke, and Gumley Ewing and Lucy Conyers (d. 1620), a daughter of Richard Conyers of Wakerley. A miniature portrait of Thomas Griffin by Nicholas Hilliard has the inscription "Anno Domini 1599, Aetatis Suae 20', he was born early in 1580.

== Anne of Denmark, Princess Elizabeth, and Prince Henry at Dingley ==
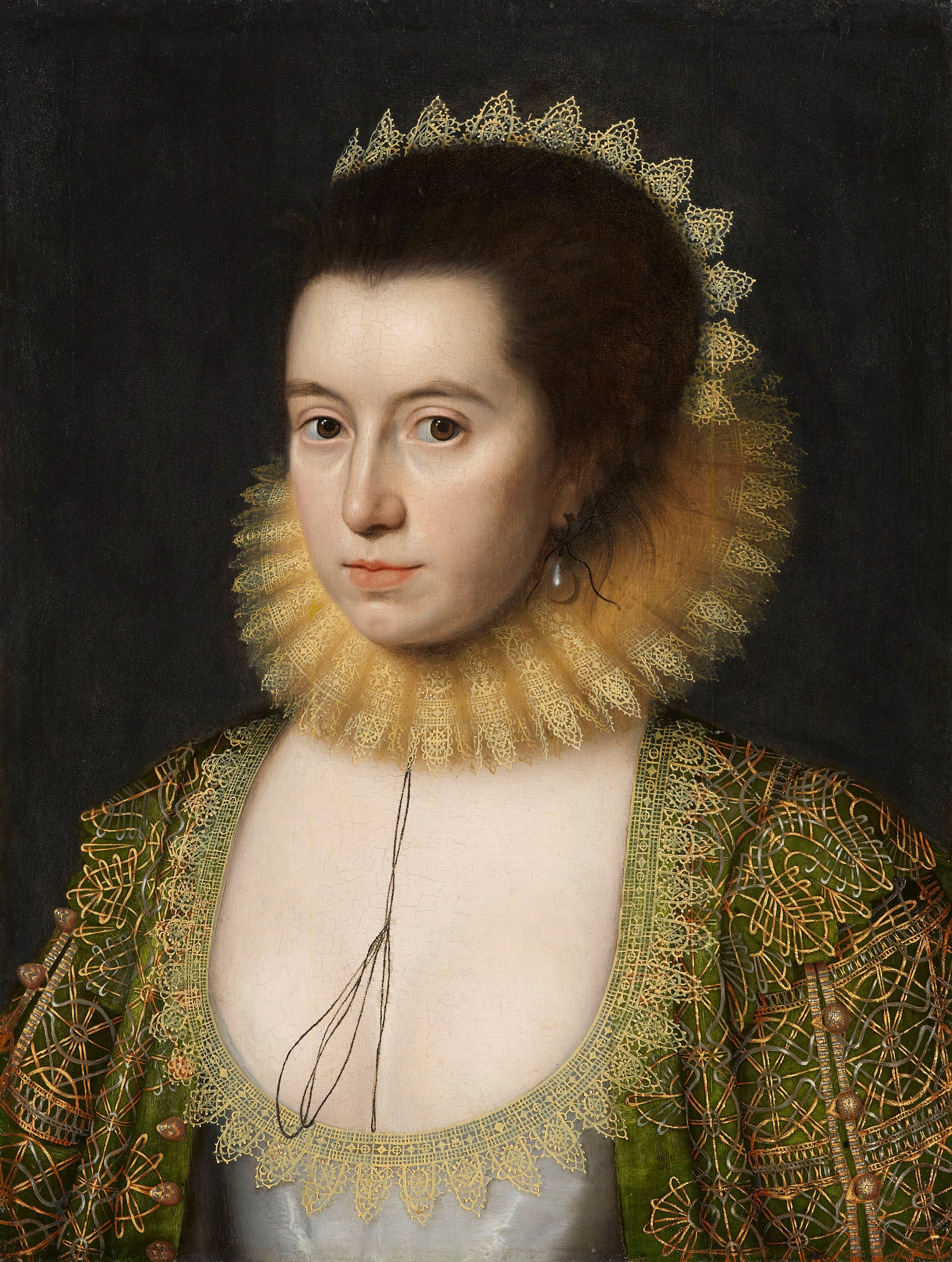
Lady Anne Clifford wrote about her visit to Dingley

In 1603 Queen Elizabeth I died. James VI of Scotland became king, an event known as the Union of the Crowns. His wife, Anne of Denmark came to England in June 1603, and noblewomen and gentry travelled to meet her, perhaps in hope of gaining favour or employment in the royal household. One of the places where Anne of Denmark stayed and received guests was Griffin's house at Dingley Hall in Northamptonshire. Dingley Hall had been rebuilt in the 1550s by Edward Griffin and his second wife Anne Smith, daughter of John Smith, baron of the Exchequer, and the porch is carved with the date 1558 and their initials, and other inscriptions.

Lady Anne Clifford came to see the new queen and Prince Henry at Dingley, and wrote about her journey from London. She rode to Tittenhanger Park, and met her mother, the Countess of Cumberland, and the next day rode to Wrest Park which was deserted and locked up. After a night at Rockingham Castle they went to Lady Nedham's house at Litchborough, and then perhaps at Wymondley Priory met Lucy Russell, Countess of Bedford, who had attended Anne of Denmark from Edinburgh. They went together to Dingley.

At Dingley on 24 June, Anne Clifford and her party were presented to the queen who greeted them with a kiss. Three favourites of Sir Robert Cecil were there, the Lady Suffolk, the young Lady Derby, and Lady Walsingham. Princess Elizabeth had already gone on to Coombe Abbey near Coventry. After a night at Dingley, Anne Clifford travelled a day south with the queen's party towards Althorp, then she and her mother and her cousin Anne Vavasour rode to Coventry to see Princess Elizabeth.

Many courtiers travelled to Northamptonshire at this time to greet the queen and her children. Lord Buckhurst wrote on 21 June 1603 that he and the Lord Keeper Thomas Egerton were travelling "to do our duties to the Queen, the Prince, and Princess, all the world flying beforehand to see her". Sir Robert Crosse complained that Elizabeth Raleigh had persuaded him to make an "idle journey" to meet the queen and she had received "but idle graces".

His father, Edward Griffin, was made a Knight of the Bath at the coronation of James VI and I in July 1603. In August 1604 Prince Charles travelled to London from Dunfermline Palace with his guardian Alexander Seton. They lodged in William Skipwith II's Leicester townhouse, and came to Dingley on 18 August.

King James came to Dingley in August 1612, 1614, and 1616.

== Later life ==
He died in 1615, and his estates passed to his younger brother, Sir Edward Griffin.

His wife, Lady Griffin, attended the funeral of Anne of Denmark in 1619 as a lady of the Privy Chamber.

== Marriages ==
Thomas Griffin married Catherine Monson, daughter of Sir John Monson of Carlton. He married secondly, Elizabeth Touchet (d. 1662), a daughter of George Touchet, Lord Audley, (she was the widow of Sir John Stawell or Stowell of Cothelstone, and mother of John Stawell), but had no male heir.

Lucy Griffin, the daughter of Thomas Griffin and Elizabeth Touchet, married Sir Richard Wiseman of Torrell's Hall, Willingale, Essex.

Frances Griffin, his sister, married Roger Smith of Withcote, brother of the mercer Ambrose Smith.
