= Sitting tenant =

A sitting tenant is a tenant already in occupation of premises, especially when there is a change of owner. Sitting tenants can result from a decision not to evict an assured shorthold tenant following a change of owner or where there is a protected tenancy. Where a landlord sells a property but decides not to evict a tenant the new landlord is said to 'step in the shoes' of the old landlord and the terms of the tenancy continue.

== Protected tenants ==
Upon the death of a sitting tenant, tenancy can pass to another family member. These tenancies were created in the United Kingdom before 15 January 1989 under the Rent Act of 1977. Sitting tenants are also referred to as protected tenants, regulated tenants and rent act tenants.

The landlord/lady is responsible for maintaining the exterior of the property and insurance for the property. The tenant is responsible for the interior of the property and paying the rent, which is below market and is set by the Rent Office. The rent can be reviewed every two years or when improvements, such as gas central heating, double glazing or a new kitchen or bathroom, have been made to the property. A landlord may not evict a sitting tenant who has a protected tenancy. In some instances the tenant may agree to move, in which case the protected tenancy agreement transfers with the tenant.
