= Philip Hoby =

16th-century English politician

The Right Honourable Sir Philip Hoby
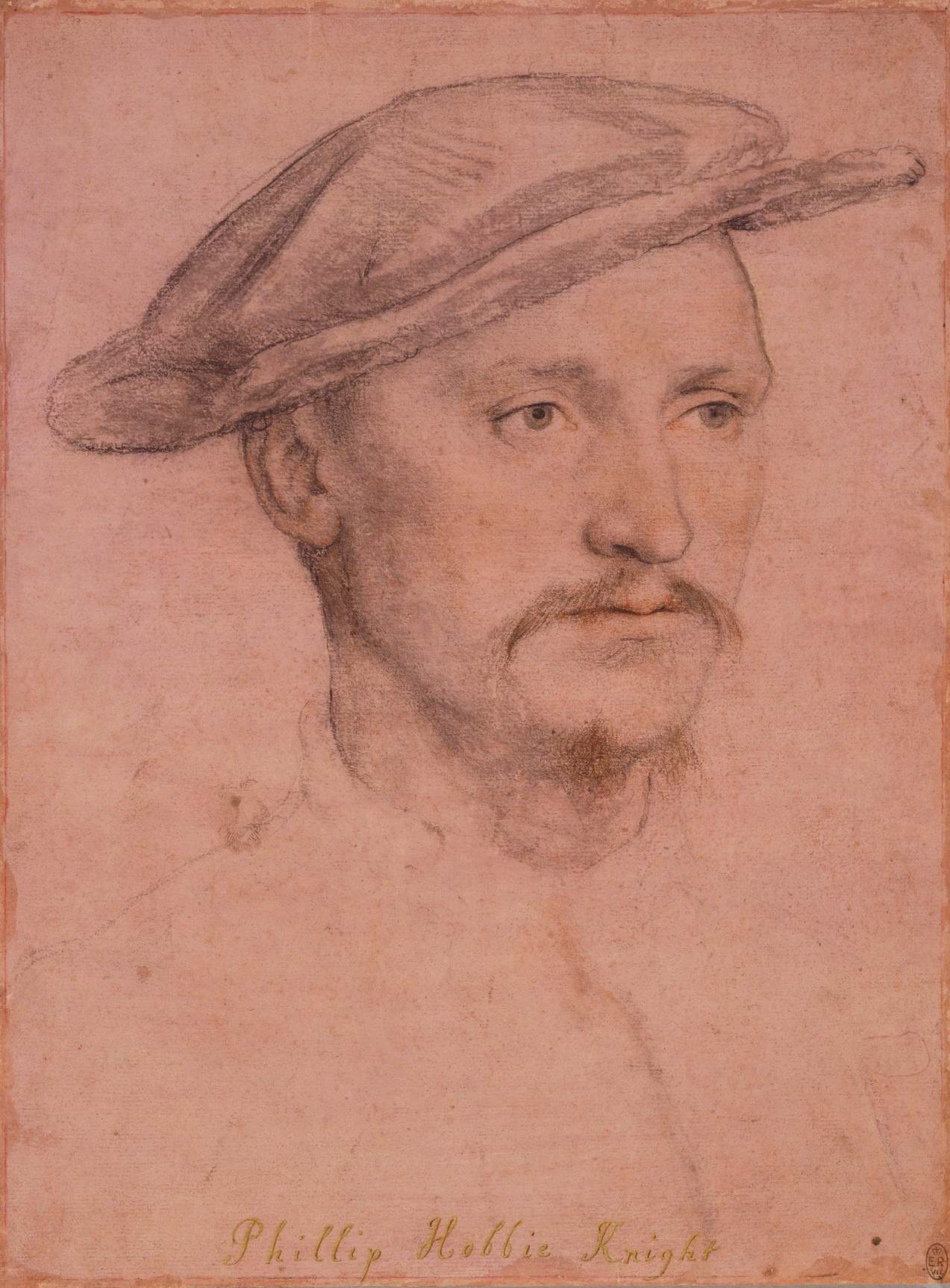
- Sir Philip Hoby, Hans Holbein the Younger
- Born: Philip Hoby; 1505; Leominster, England
- Died: 31 May 1558 (aged 52–53); Blackfriars, London
- Resting place: Bisham church, Berkshire
- Occupation: English diplomat
- Spouse: Elizabeth Stonor
- Parent(s): William Hoby; Catherine Forster
- Relatives: Edward Hoby (nephew); Thomas Posthumous Hoby (nephew)

Sir Philip Hoby (also Hobby or Hobbye) PC (1505 – 31 May 1558) was a 16th-century English Ambassador to the Holy Roman Empire and Flanders.

== Early life ==
He was born probably at Leominster, England, the son of William Hoby of Leominster by his first wife, Catherine Forster. He was the elder half-brother of Sir Thomas Hoby, father of Edward and Thomas Posthumous Hoby.

Hoby became a diplomat, largely thanks to the support he gave to the Protestant Reformation during the reign of King Henry VIII.

== Career ==
He travelled to Spain and Portugal in the royal service. On 10 March 1538 he arrived at Brussels with the painter Hans Holbein the Younger. Thomas Cromwell had sent them to make a portrait of Christina, Duchess of Milan for Henry VIII. The English resident in Brussels, John Hutton, had already obtained a portrait, but realising this portrait was not as perfect as one made by Master Haunce, "a man very excellent in makyng of phisanymies," he recalled his messenger. Hoby was introduced to a courtier of the Regent of the Netherlands, Lord Benedict Court, and they spoke together in Italian. Benedict, who was Grand Master of the Duchess' house, then made the arrangements for Holbein to have a sitting of three hours with the Duchess, where he "proved himself the master of his science." Hoby and Holbein departed the same night taking leave of the Duchess, (making a formal farewell), but not to the Lady Regent. Henry received the portrait of Christina on 18 March 1538 and was delighted.

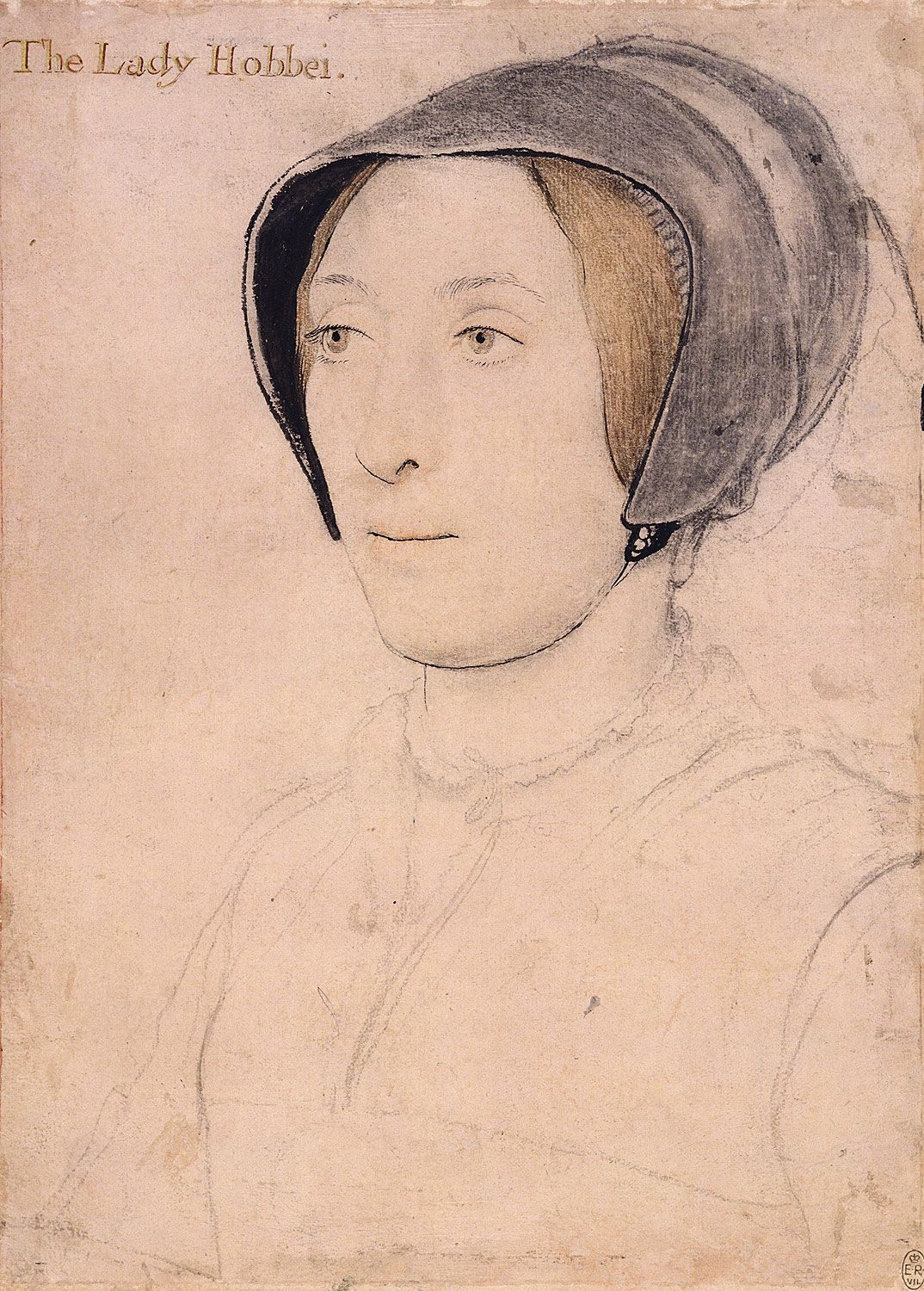
The Lady Hobbei, Hans Holbein the Younger

On a second trip to France, Hoby and Holbein painted the Princess Margaret of France, and perhaps Mary of Bourbon, then they arrived at Joinville in France at the end of August 1538. They wanted a portrait of Louise de Guise, daughter of Antoinette, Duchess of Guise. Hoby mentioned that they had been to Nancy. Antoinette guessed they had obtained the portrait of Anna of Lorraine there, and joked with her daughter, the Queen of Scotland, that soon either her sister or her cousin would become her neighbour by marrying Henry VIII.

By 1542, he was a gentlemen usher of the King's Privy Chamber, and was involved in the persecution of Jews. In 1543, however, Hoby was briefly held in the Fleet Prison on suspicion of heretical beliefs. Following the Siege of Boulogne, Hoby was knighted and received gifts of property, including some of the profits from the Dissolution of the Monasteries. In 1545, he became Master of the Ordnance in the North, and in 1547, Master-General of the Ordnance, a post he held until 1554. In 1547 he replaced John Cock as MP for Cardiff Boroughs when Cock resigned to sit for Calne. In 1548, he succeeded Bishop Thomas Thirlby as ambassador to the court of Charles V, Holy Roman Emperor. During this period, he helped plot the downfall of the Lord Protector, Edward Seymour, 1st Duke of Somerset.

In 1551, Hoby was involved in attempts to negotiate a marriage between King Edward VI and Elizabeth, the daughter of King Henry II of France. He was also trusted to negotiate loans with from merchants in Antwerp, and was involved in a diplomatic mission to Flanders. He was admitted to the Privy Council in March 1552. The manor of Bisham Abbey in Berkshire was given to him, at the expense of the former queen, Anne of Cleves.

In 1553, Hoby was again at the court of Charles V, trying to negotiate a peace between him and Henry II of France. Shortly afterwards, he became ambassador to Flanders. During the brief reign of Lady Jane Grey, Hoby appears to have supported her. He was recalled by Queen Mary I on her accession, but he managed to retain her favour. In June 1554, he was sent to Brussels on a diplomatic mission, but was allowed to travel to Liege and Pau for his health. In June 1555, he was staying with Sir John Cheke at Padua, and went on from there to visit Sir John Masone, the English ambassador at Antwerp. He returned home in 1556.

== Personal life ==
By 1540 he had married Elizabeth Stonor, daughter of Sir Walter Stonor of Stonor, Oxfordshire, widow of Sir William Compton and of Walter Walshe (d. 1538). They had no children.

Sir Philip died at his house in Blackfriars, London and was buried in Bisham Church where there is a fine effigial monument to him and his brother.

== Notes ==
Military offices
Preceded by Sir Thomas Seymour	Master-General of the Ordnance; 1547–1554	Succeeded by Sir Richard Southwell
