= Braybrooke =

Village in Northamptonshire, England

Coordinates: 52.44°N 00.88°W

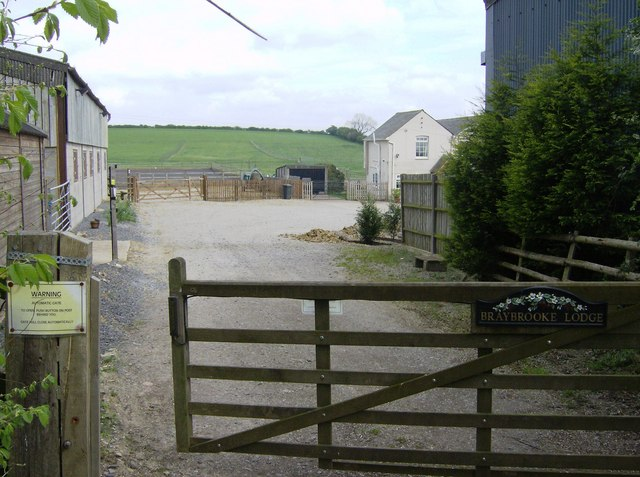
- Braybrooke Lodge gate

- Location within Northamptonshire
- Population: 378 (2011)
- OS grid reference: SP7684
- Unitary authority: North Northamptonshire
- Ceremonial county: Northamptonshire
- Region: East Midlands
- Country: England
- Sovereign state: United Kingdom
- Post town: MARKET HARBOROUGH
- Postcode district: LE16
- Dialling code: 01858
- Police: Northamptonshire
- Fire: Northamptonshire
- Ambulance: East Midlands
- UK Parliament: Kettering

Braybrooke is a small village in north west Northamptonshire, England. The population of the civil parish at the 2011 census was 378. It is situated about halfway between Market Harborough and Desborough. It lies in a valley between two ridges one of which is surmounted by the A6 trunk road. The surrounding land in the parish is a mixture of pasture and arable.

The villages name means 'The broad brook'.

== Church of All Saints ==
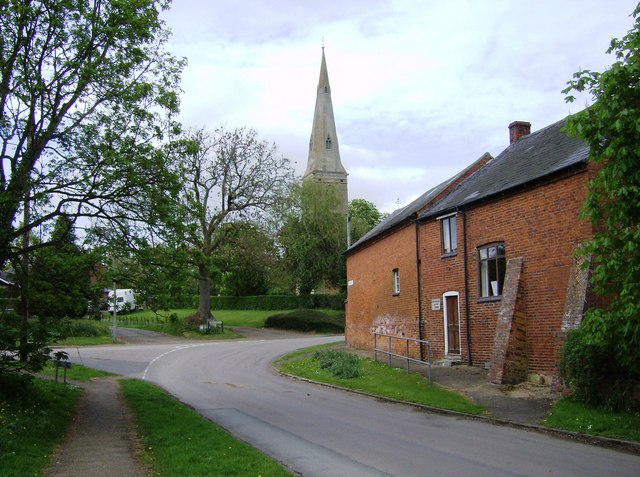
All Saints church and baptist chapel

The most significant building in modern Braybrooke is the Church, dedicated to All Saints. This lies on the central village cross-roads and a key feature is the magnificent elongated spire which was built in the late 14th century or early 15th century.

The oldest surviving parts of the church, the moulded south doorway and the eastern bay of the nave, are thought to date from the 13th century. The church was extended considerably in the 14th century. After two centuries of neglect significant and sympathetic restoration work was done over a long period in the late 19th and early 20th centuries.

== Braybrooke Castle ==
Braybrooke Castle is today no more than a large area of extensive earthworks on the east side of the village. The castle was actually a fortified manor house associated, in the main, with two families - Latimer and Griffin. All that is visible today is the platform on which the manor house stood and the remains of both large and small fish ponds which served the manor.

First mentioned in the mid C12. c.1200 documents mention fishponds already in use. The acquisition of timber for building work is recorded in 1213, and a garden in 1292. In 1304 Thomas de Latimer was granted a licence to strengthen his manor house at Braybrooke and documentary sources indicate that the moated house was constructed at this time. In 1329-30 there is mention of a waterfilled moat. Described as a castle in 1361. The manor passed to the Griffin family in the early C15. The castle buildings were used as a farmhouse from 1549-50 until demolition prior to 1633. A mid-C17 farmhouse stood on the site until 1960.

On 12 August 1605 King James I and Anne of Denmark came from Kirby Hall and visited Edward Griffin at the castle, and travelled on to Great Harrowden.

== Famous residents past and present ==
- Sir Thomas Latimer - Lord of the manor and leading figure in the Lollard movement.
- Robert of Braybrooke - landowner, justice and sheriff (1168-1210)
- Graham Moffatt (1919-1965) - comic actor and publican
- Lukwesa Burak (born 1974/5) - BBC News presenter
