= Dingley, Northamptonshire =

Village and civil parish in Northamptonshire, England

Coordinates: 52.4787°N 0.8650°W

Dingley
- Location within Northamptonshire
- Population: 194 (2011 Census)
- OS grid reference: SP7787
  - London: 90 miles (145 km)
- Unitary authority: North Northamptonshire
- Ceremonial county: Northamptonshire
- Region: East Midlands
- Country: England
- Sovereign state: United Kingdom
- Post town: Market Harborough
- Postcode district: LE16
- Dialling code: 01858
- Police: Northamptonshire
- Fire: Northamptonshire
- Ambulance: East Midlands
- UK Parliament: Kettering

Dingley is a village and civil parish in Northamptonshire, England, located along the A427, about 2 miles (3.2 km) east of the nearest town, Market Harborough. It is also close to the A6 and near the border with Leicestershire. At the time of the 2001 census, the parish's population was 209 people, reducing to 194 at the 2011 census.

The villages name origin is uncertain. 'Dynni's wood/clearing' or perhaps, 'hollow wood/clearing'.

== Governance ==
Dingley is part of North Northamptonshire. Before local government changes it was part of Kettering borough.

== Dingley Hall ==
The main feature of the village is Dingley Hall which has had many famous owners over the centuries.

A house has stood on this site from medieval times when it was a Preceptory for the Knights' Hospitallers. It is first recorded as Dinglei, meaning "the woodland clearing marked by valleys". At the dissolution of the monasteries it was sold to Edward Griffin. During the late 1550s Griffin had the house extensively rebuilt leaving only the older tower, and adding a renaissance style porch. Further additions were made in the 1680s and the porch - which is dated 1558 - was re-sited during these alterations. In 1781-2 the west wing was demolished, but it remained a large rambling house.

On 24 June 1603 Sir Thomas Griffin entertained Anne of Denmark her son Prince Henry, and Princess Elizabeth at Dingley, on their way to London from Edinburgh. Lady Anne Clifford and her aunt the Countess of Warwick travelled from London to see the queen at Dingley, meeting Lucy, Countess of Bedford on the way. The queen moved to Althorp the next day.

It became the home of the First World War naval leader Admiral David Beatty.

The Hall continued as a family home until 1936. During World War II it was used as a nursing home. Although the estate was sold in 1958, the house was left to deteriorate until it was gutted in 1972. In 1978, it was bought by the architect Kit Martin who divided it into seven houses and three flats. Nothing is left of the original interiors.

Although Dingley Hall is a private property, for 30 years it hosted musical events throughout the year called 'Music at Dingley' with concerts in the Norman church or in the Porch House. Having had 30 wonderful years of music making, the committee have decided to stop.

== Village ==
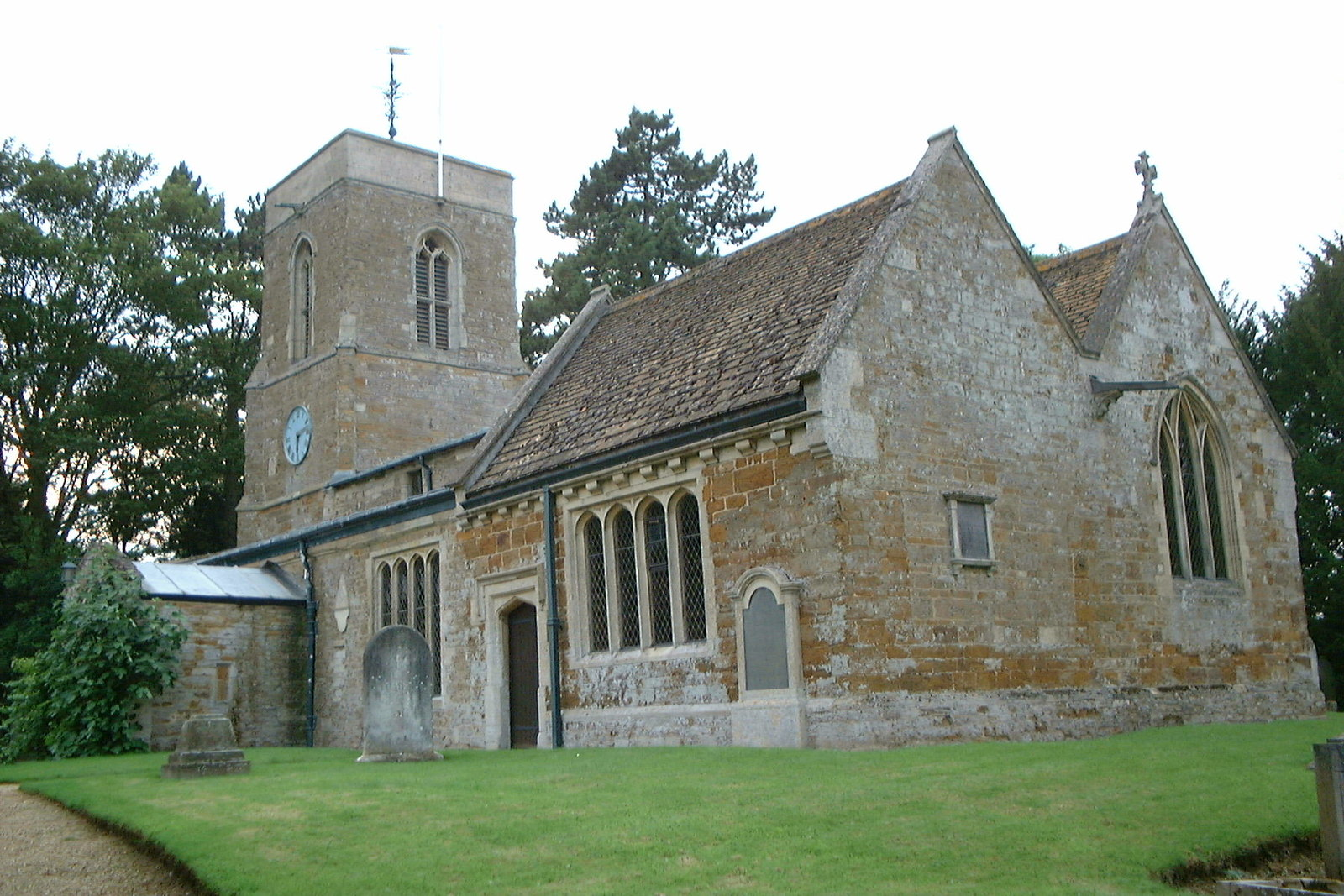
All Saints church, Dingley

A small village grew up as part of the Dingley Hall estate; there are two distinctive rows of attractive workers' cottages on the A427 half a mile into the village beyond Dingley Hall gatehouse. Point to point racing takes place between Easter and summer and draws a crowd averaging 10,000 at each meeting.
