= Lawrence Hyde =

Lawrence Hyde may refer to:

- Lawrence Hyde (died 1590), MP for Malmesbury, Heytesbury and Chippenham
- Lawrence Hyde (attorney-general) (1562–1641), attorney-general to Anne of Denmark, James I's consort
- Lawrence Hyde (MP for Hindon) (c. 1595–1643), English lawyer and politician
- Lawrence Hyde (MP for Winchester) (c. 1610–1682), Member of Parliament for Winchester, 1661–1679

== See also ==
- Laurence Hyde (disambiguation)
- Laurance M. Hyde (1892–1978), American jurist, chief justice of the Missouri Supreme Court
