= Lawrence Hyde (MP for Hindon) =

English lawyer and politician

Member of Parliament for Hindon
- In office 1624–1625
- In office 1628–1629

Personal details
- Born: 1593
- Died: 3 December 1643
- Resting place: Heale, Woodford, Wiltshire
- Spouse(s): Amphillis Tichborne (m. 1619; died 1632), Katherine Hyde (m. after 1632; wid. 1643)
- Relatives: Edward Hyde, 1st Earl of Clarendon (cousin); Robert Hyde (brother); Alexander Hyde (brother)
- Education: Magdalen Hall, Oxford
- Occupation: Lawyer, politician

Lawrence Hyde (1593–1643) was an English lawyer and politician who sat in the House of Commons in two parliaments between 1624 and 1629.

Hyde was the son of Sir Lawrence Hyde, of Heale, Woodford, near Salisbury, Wiltshire. He was the brother of Robert Hyde and Alexander Hyde, and cousin of Edward Hyde, 1st Earl of Clarendon. He was a student of Middle Temple in 1608 and matriculated at Magdalen Hall, Oxford on 9 March 1610, aged 16, then was awarded BA on 19 July 1612.

In 1624, Hyde was elected Member of Parliament for Hindon. He was re-elected for Hindon in 1628 and sat until 1629 when King Charles decided to rule without parliament for eleven years.

Hyde died in 1643 and was buried on 3 December 1643. He was married in 1619 to Amphillis, daughter of Sir Richard Tichborne of Winchester; she died in 1632. Secondly to Katherine, who outlived him. In October 1651 she gave shelter to the future Charles II at Heale House during his flight after the Battle of Worcester.

Parliament of England
Preceded by Sir Edmund Ludlow; John Davies	Member of Parliament for Hindon; 1624; With: Matthew Davies	Succeeded by Sir Thomas Thynne; William Lambert
Preceded by Sir Thomas Thynne; Thomas Lambert	Member of Parliament for Hindon; 1628–1629; With: Sir Thomas Thynne	Parliament suspended until 1640
