= William Beecher (died 1694) =

English politician

Sir William Beecher (24 April 1628 – 5 December 1694) was an English politician who sat in the House of Commons from 1667 to 1679.

Beecher was the son of Oliver Beecher of Fotheringhay, Northamptonshire and Howbury, Bedfordshire and his wife Elizabeth Tate, daughter of Sir William Tate of Delapré Abbey, Northamptonshire. He was admitted at Trinity College, Cambridge on 17 September 1645. In 1657, he was commissioner for assessment for Bedfordshire. He succeeded his father by 1659. He was J.P. for Bedfordshire from March 1660 to 1680. He was commissioner for militia for Bedfordshire in March 1660 and Captain-Lieutenant of the Bedfordshire Militia Horse in April 1660. In August 1660 he became Deputy Lieutenant and commissioner for assessment for Bedfordshire and in September 1660 a J.P. for Bedford. He was one of those nominated to be Knight of the Royal Oak and had an estate worth £1,600 a year. He was knighted on 16 November 1660. In 1661 he was made a freeman of Bedford and was made commissioner for assessment until 1663 and J.P. for Bedford for the year. He was J.P. for Bedford again in 1663.

In 1667, Beecher was elected Member of Parliament for Bedford in a by-election to the Cavalier Parliament. He was J.P. for Bedford again in 1670 and 1672 and commissioner for assessment for Bedford from 1673 to 1674. In 1675 he was commissioner for recusants for Bedfordshire. He lost his commission of the peace and lieutenancy for Bedfordshire in around 1680. He became Deputy Lieutenant again from February to June 1688 and from 1689 to his death. He was commissioner for assessment for Bedfordshire from 1689 to 1690 and J.P. for Bedfordshire from 1689 to his death.

Beecher died at the age of 66 and was buried at Renhold.

Beecher married firstly on 15 February 1656, his cousin Frances St John daughter of Oliver St John, 5th Baron St John of Bletso. They had a son and daughter but she died in 1658 and was buried on 17 September 1658 . He married secondly on 24 December 1660, Elizabeth Hillersden, widow of Thomas Hillersden of Elstow, Bedfordshire and daughter of John Huxley of Edmonton, Middlesex. They had three sons and a daughter. She died in 1705 and was buried on 20 January 1705.

Parliament of England
| Preceded by Richard Taylor; John Kelyng | Member of Parliament for Bedford; 1667–1679; With: Paulet St John | Succeeded by Paulet St John; Sir William Francklyn |
