= Robert Hyde (judge) =

English judge

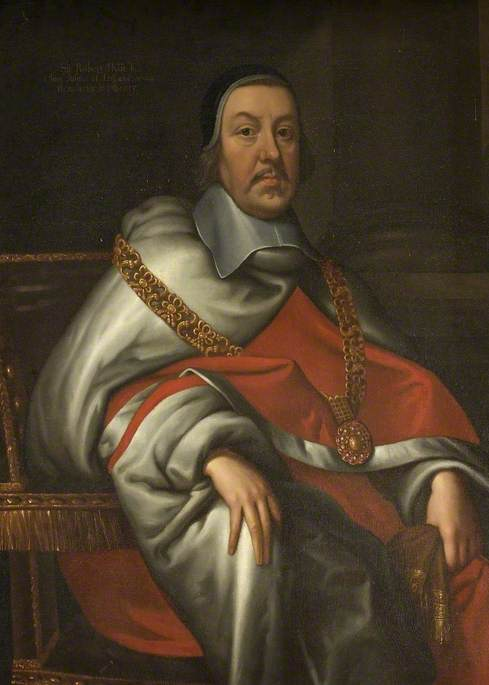
Sir Robert Hyde

Sir Robert Hyde (1595–1665) was an English judge and Chief Justice of the King's Bench.

== Early career ==
Hyde, who was born at his father's house, Heale, Woodford, near Salisbury, in 1595, was the eldest of the four most prominent sons of Sir Lawrence Hyde, attorney-general to Anne, the consort of King James I. Sir Robert Hyde's mother was the former Barbara Castillion of Benham, Berkshire. Alexander Hyde, Sir Henry Hyde, and Edward Hyde were his brothers; Edward, 1st Earl of Clarendon, was his first cousin.

He was called to the bar at the Middle Temple 7 February 1617, was appointed Lent Reader there in 1638, and became a serjeant-at-law in May 1640. In the time of Lord Coke he attended as reporter in the King's Bench. He was recorder of Salisbury as early as 1638, when complaints were made against him for his remissness in collecting ship-money.

== Conduct during the Civil War and Protectorate ==
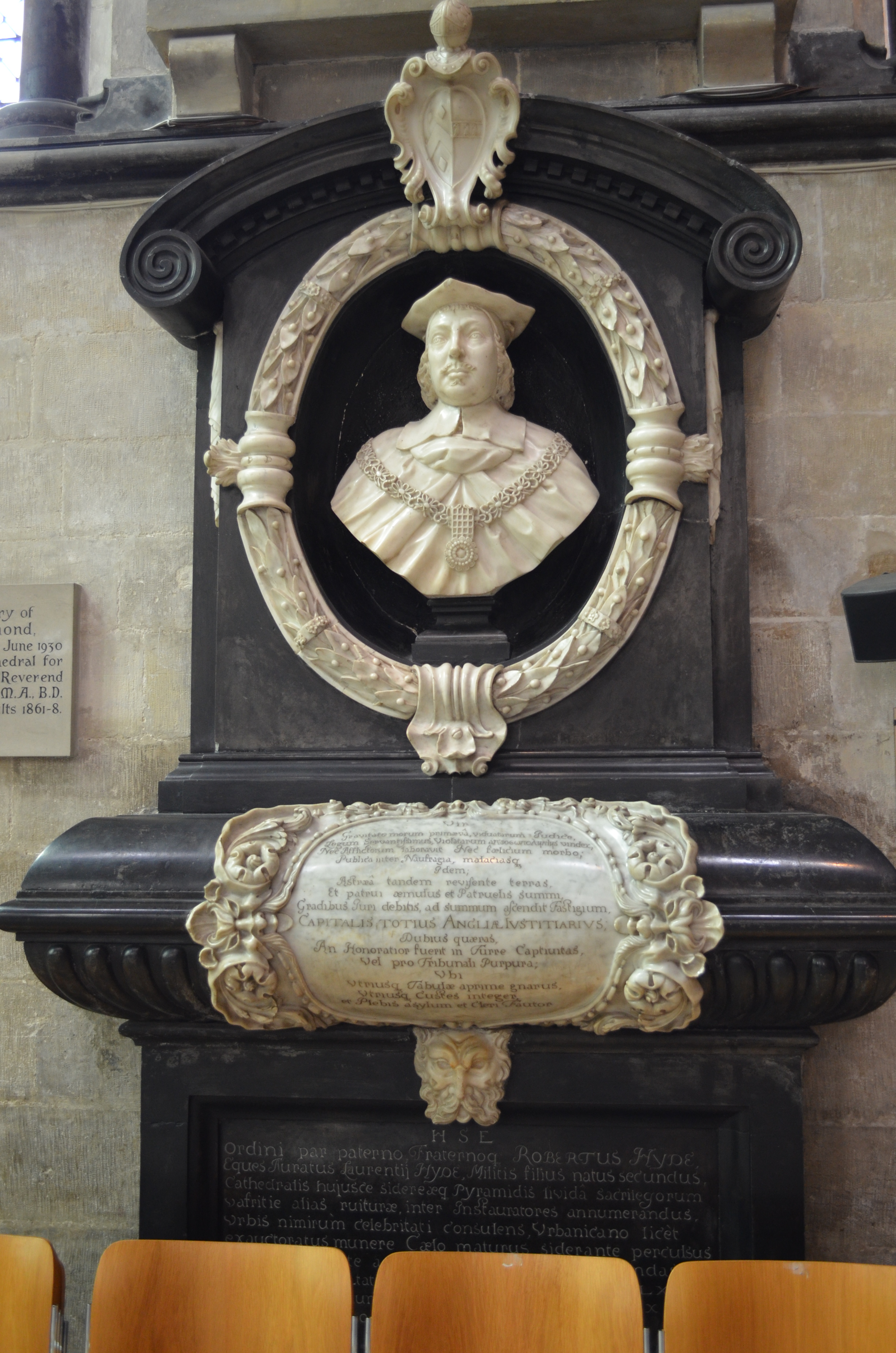
Mural monument in Salisbury Cathedral with marble bust of Robert Hyde

Arms of Hyde: Azure, a chevron between three lozenges or

Hyde represented Salisbury in the Short Parliament and the Long Parliament, professed loyalist principles, voted against the bill for the attainder of Strafford, and was accordingly included in the list of the minority, whose names were placarded as betrayers of their country. Having joined the king at Oxford, he was voted a malignant by parliament, and incapacitated from sitting in the house. He was committed to the Tower from 4 to 18 Aug. 1645, and on 11 May 1646 was deprived of the recordership of Salisbury, He then retired into private life. In 1651 Charles II during his flight from Worcester was sheltered for some days in his house at Heale. During the protectorate, he occasionally practised his profession, and his name occurs in the reports of Siderfin and Hardres.

== Judicial career ==
At the Restoration he was knighted, and appointed a judge of the common pleas, 31 May 1660, and on 14 June 1660 was reinstated in the recordership of Salisbury. He was also a commissioner upon the trial of the regicides, but took no part beyond advising upon points of law. Thanks to his cousin's influence, he was promoted to be Chief Justice of the King's Bench on 19 October 1663. He is said to have been an authority upon pleas of the crown, but was not learned otherwise. Upon the trials of Twyn for printing a book called A Treatise of the Execution of Justice, and of the Baptist preacher Benjamin Keach at Aylesbury for publishing The Child's Instructor, he took a tone very hostile to dissenters and seditious books. He was not, however, always opposed to non-conformists. Roger Pepys MP, known to readers of the Diary of Samuel Pepys as "Cousin Roger", and who inclined to non-conformity, was bound over to be of good behaviour at the Cambridge Assizes in 1664 for speaking insultingly of Hyde at a town session.

He died suddenly on the bench on 1 May 1665, and was buried in Salisbury Cathedral.

== Private life ==
Hyde's wife was Mary, daughter of Francis Baber, M.D., of Chew Magna, Somerset, but he had no children. By the demise of his brother Lawrence he came into possession of the Heale estates in the Amesbury valley, and these, with his collection of heirlooms, he settled on the issue of his brother Alexander, Bishop of Salisbury.

Legal offices
Preceded by Sir Robert Foster	Lord Chief Justice; 1663–1665	Succeeded by John Kelynge
