= Alexander Hyde =

English royalist clergyman

The Right Reverend Alexander Hyde
- Bishop of Salisbury
- Church: Church of England
- Diocese: Diocese of Salisbury
- In office: 1665–1667
- Predecessor: John Earle
- Successor: Seth Ward

Orders
- Ordination: before 1634
- Consecration: 31 December 1665 by Gilbert Sheldon

Personal details
- Born: 1598 Salisbury, Wiltshire, England
- Died: 22 August 1667 (aged 69) St Giles in the Fields, Middlesex, England
- Denomination: Anglican
- Education: New College, Oxford

Alexander Hyde (1598–1667) was an English royalist clergyman, Bishop of Salisbury from 1665 to 1667.

== Life ==
Hyde was born at Salisbury in 1598, the second-born of the four most prominent sons of Lawrence Hyde. At the age of 12 (1610) he entered Winchester College as a scholar, and matriculated 17 November 1615 at New College, Oxford. In 1617, he was admitted perpetual fellow there, and afterwards graduated Bachelor of Civil Law (BCL) 24 April 1623, and Doctor of Civil Law (DCL) 4 July 1632.

In 1634, Hyde was made rector of Wylye and Little Langford, Wiltshire. In May 1637, Hyde became subdean and prebendary of Salisbury Cathedral, stall of South Grantham (4 March 1639). Like other members of his family, he was a staunch royalist and was sequestered from his livings under the Commonwealth, but reoccupied them at the Restoration. According to his epitaph, he gave generously to the repairs of the cathedral after its desecration by the soldiers of the parliament.

Due to the influence of the Edward Hyde, 1st Earl of Clarendon (his first cousin), he was at the Restoration rewarded by the deanery of Winchester (installed 8 August 1660) and, on the death of John Earle in 1665, was appointed to the See of Salisbury. He resigned the subdeanery of Salisbury in 1661 and his prebend there in 1665. His consecration as a bishop took place 31 December 1665 in New College Chapel, Oxford. Hyde died in St Giles in the Fields (near London), on 22 August 1667, aged 69, and was buried in the south aisle of the nave of Salisbury Cathedral, beneath a black marble slab bearing a Latin inscription.

== Family ==
His father, Lawrence Hyde, was the second son of Lawrence Hyde of Gussage St Michael, Dorset, who was third son of Robert Hyde of Norbury, Cheshire. His mother was Barbara Castilion of Benham, Berkshire. His brothers were Edward Hyde (a priest), Robert Hyde (a judge), and Henry Hyde (a diplomat), who was beheaded in London in 1650. His first cousin was Edward Hyde, 1st Earl of Clarendon.

By his wife, Mary, daughter of Robert Tounson, and niece of John Davenant, Hyde had three daughters and a son, Robert (1650–1722), who ultimately succeeded to the family estates. His daughter, Margaret, was married to the paternal grandfather of vice-admiral Hyde Parker.

Church of England titles
Preceded by John Earle	Bishop of Salisbury; 1665–1667	Succeeded by Seth Ward
