= Ashby v White =

UK constitutional law case concerning the right to vote

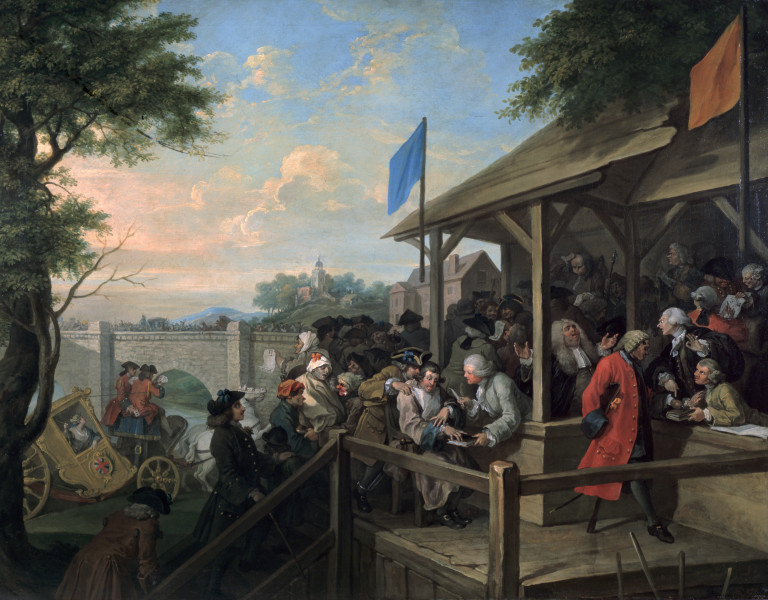
- An Election III, The Polling, by William Hogarth
- Court: Court of King's Bench
- Decided: 1 January 1703
- Citations: (1703) 92 ER 126, (1703) 2 Ld Raym 938, (1703) 1 Sm LC (13th Edn) 253

Case opinions
- Holt CJ, Powell J, Powys J, Gould J
- Dissent: Holt CJ

Keywords
- Rights; Vote; Property; injuria sine damno; Exemplary damages; Writ of error

Ashby v White (1703) 92 ER 126, is a foundational case in UK constitutional law and English tort law. It concerns the right to vote and misfeasance of a public officer. Lord Holt laid down the important principle that where there is injury in the absence of financial loss (injuria sine damno), the law makes the presumption of damages and that it is sufficient to demonstrate that a right has been infringed.

Holt said: "It is a vain thing to imagine, there should be right without a remedy; for want of right and want of remedy are convertibles: if a statute gives a right, the common law will give remedy to maintain it; and where-ever there is injury, it imports a damage."

== Facts ==
Mr Ashby was prevented from voting at an election by the misfeasance of a constable, Mr White, on the apparent pretext that he was not a settled inhabitant.

At the time, the case attracted considerable national interest, and debates in Parliament. It was later known as the Aylesbury election case. In the House of Lords, it attracted the interest of Peter King, 1st Baron King who spoke and maintained the right of electors to have a remedy at common law for denial of their votes, against Tory insistence on the privileges of the House of Commons.

Sir Thomas Powys defended William White in the House of Lords. The argument submitted was that the Commons alone had the power to determine election cases, not the courts.

== Judgment ==
Lord Holt CJ was dissenting from the judgment in the Court of King's Bench, and his dissent was upheld by the House of Lords by a vote of 50–16. His judgment reads as follows.

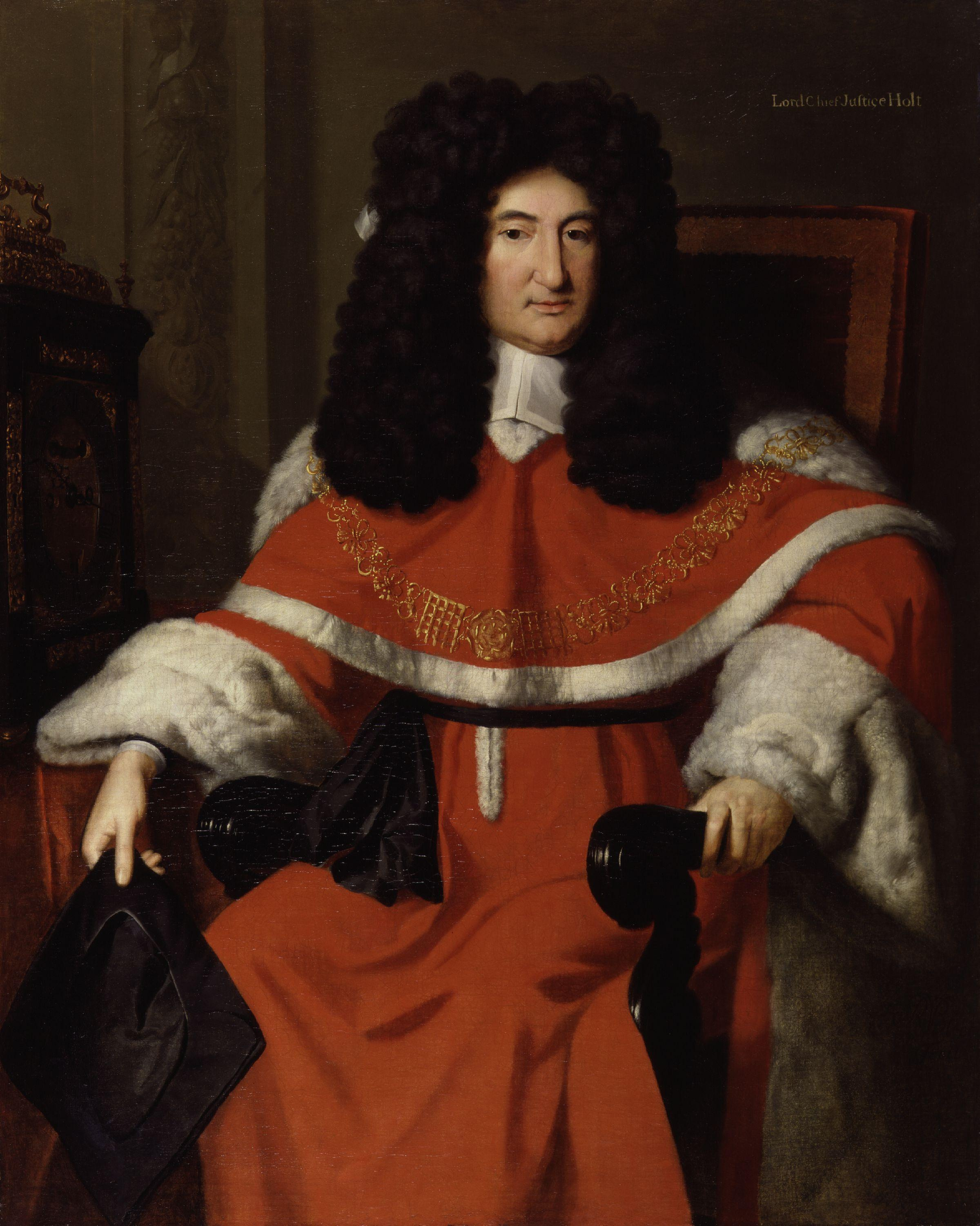
Lord Holt CJ, by Richard Van Bleeck, ca 1700

So in the case of Mellor v Spateman, 1 Saund. 343, where the Corporation of Derby claim common by prescription, and though the inheritance of the common be in the body politic, yet the particular members enjoy the fruit and benefit of it, and put in their own cattle to feed on the common, and not the cattle belonging to the corporation; but that is not indeed our case. But from hence it appears that every man, that is to give his vote on the election of members to serve in Parliament, has a several and particular right in his private capacity, as a citizen or burgess. And surely it cannot be said, that this is so inconsiderable a right, as to apply that maxim to it, de minimis non curat lex. A right that a man has to give his vote at the election of a person to represent him in Parliament, there to concur to the making of laws, which are to bind his liberty and property, is a most transcendent thing, and of an high nature, and the law takes notice of it as such in divers statutes: as in the statute of 34 & 35 H. 8, c. 13, intitled An Act for Making of Knights and Burgesses within the County and City of Chester; where in the preamble it is said, that whereas the said County Palatine of Chester is and hath been always hitherto exempt, excluded, and separated out, and from the King's Court, by reason whereof the said inhabitants have hitherto sustained manifold disherisons, losses, and damages, as well in their lands, goods, and bodies, as in the good, civil, and politic governance, and maintenance of the commonwealth of their said county, &c. So that the opinion of the Parliament is, that the want of this privilege occasions great loss and damage. And the same farther appears from the 25 Car. 2, c. 9, an Act to enable the County Palatine of Durham to send knights and burgesses to serve in Parliament, which recites, whereas the inhabitants of the County Palatine of Durham have not hitherto had the liberty and privilege of electing and sending any knights and burgesses to the High Court of Parliament, &c. The right of voting at the election of burgesses is a thing of the highest importance, and so great a privilege, that it is a great injury to deprive the plaintiff of it. These reasons have satisfied me as to the first point.

If the plaintiff has a right, he must of necessity have a means to vindicate and maintain it, and a remedy if he is injured in the exercise or enjoyment of it, and, indeed it is a vain thing to imagine a right without a remedy; for want of right and want of remedy are reciprocal...

And I am of opinion, that this action on the case is a proper action. My brother Powell indeed thinks, that an action upon the case is not maintainable, because here is no hurt or damage to the plaintiff; but surely every injury imports a damage, though it does not cost the party one farthing, and it is impossible to prove the contrary; for a damage is not merely pecuniary, but an injury imports a damage, when a man is thereby hindered of his right. As in an action for slanderous words, though a man does not lose a penny by reason of the speaking them, yet he shall have an action. So if a man gives another a cuff on the ear, though it cost him nothing, no not so much as a little diachylon, yet he shall have his action, for it is a personal injury. So a man shall have an action against another for riding over his ground, though it do him no damage; for it is an invasion of his property, and the other has no right to come there. And in these cases the action is brought vi et armis. But for invasion of another's franchise, trespass vi et armis does not lie, but an action of trespass on the case; as where a man has retorna brevium, he shall have an action against any one who enters and invades his franchise, though he lose nothing by it. So here in the principal case, the plaintiff is obstructed of his right, and shall therefore have his action. And it is no objection to say, that it will occasion multiplicity of actions; for if men will multiply injuries, actions must be multiplied too; for every man that is injured ought to have his recompence...

To allow this action will make publick officers more careful to observe the constitution of cities and boroughs, and not to be so partial as they commonly are in all elections, which is indeed a great and growing mischief, and tends to the prejudice of the peace of the nation...

Let us consider wherein the law consists, and we shall find it to be, not in particular instances and precedents; but on the reason of the law, and ubi eadem ratio, ibi idem jus. This privilege of voting does not differ from any other franchise whatsoever. If the House of Commons do determine this matter, it is not that they have an original right, but as incident to elections. But we do not deny them their right of examining elections, but we must not be frighted when a matter of property comes before us, by saying it belongs to the Parliament; we must exert the Queen's jurisdiction. My opinion is founded on the law of England.

== Exemplary damages ==
As far back as 1703, exemplary damages were being recognised as part of the decision in Ashby for misfeasance in public office, where it was accepted that a greater degree of compensatory damages would be appropriate in order to both punish and deter harmful conduct by office holders.

...if publick [sic] officers will infringe men's rights, they ought to pay greater damages than other men, to deter and hinder other officers from the like offences.

— Holt CJ, Ashby v White (1703) 92 ER 126, 135; 2 Ld Raym 938, 952

In 1704, on the reversal of the judgment given in the lower court, it was ordered by the House of Lords that Matthew Ashby could recover his damages as assessed by the jury and was also awarded costs.

== See also ==
- Pender v Lushington, per Jessel MR, a statement that a shareholder's vote is a right of property in UK company law.
