= Richard Taylor (Royalist) =

Historical member of the English House of Commons

Richard Taylor (1620 – 30 November 1667) was an English politician who sat in the House of Commons from 1661 to 1667. He supported the Royalist cause in the English Civil War.

== Biography ==
Taylor was the son of Richard Taylor, counsellor at law, of Grymsbury, Bolnhurst, Bedfordshire, and his wife Elizabeth Boteler, daughter of William Boteler of Biddenham, Bedfordshire. He was baptised on 20 March 1620. He matriculated at Magdalen College, Oxford on 17 June 1636 aged 16 and was a student of Lincoln's Inn in 1637. He succeeded to a share in his father's estate at Clapham, Bedfordshire in 1641. He served in the Royalist army in the Civil War under Sir Ralph Hopton without apparently any military rank. His share of the Clapham estate was sequestered, and in 1647 he was fined £450 for delinquency. In 1655 was assessed at £90 for decimation. At the Restoration it was written that he had "continued faithful in the late war to the surrender of Oxford and hath been several times since imprisoned for his fidelity to your Majesty". He was one of those proposed for the order of Knight of the Royal Oak with an estate of £1,000 a year.

Taylor was a J.P. for Bedfordshire from July 1660, and Deputy Lieutenant for Bedfordshire and commissioner for assessment for Bedfordshire from August 1660, holding these positions until his death. He was a J.P. for Bedford in September 1660. In 1661, he was elected Member of Parliament for Bedford in the Cavalier Parliament. There was a double return, but Taylor’s election was not affected. He was J.P. for Bedford in 1661 and became commissioner for assessment for Bedford in 1661. He was J.P. for Bedford again in 1662 and also commissioner for loyal and indigent officers for Bedfordshire.

Taylor died at the age of 47 and was buried at Clapham.

Taylor married, by license dated 17 May 1648, Catherine Bosdon, daughter of Edward Bosdon of the Middle Temple, and had five sons and three daughters.

Parliament of England
Preceded by Sir Samuel Luke; Humphrey Winch	Member of Parliament for Bedford; 1661–1667; With: John Kelyng 1661–1663; Paulet St John 1663–1667	Succeeded by Paulet St John; Sir William Beecher
