= Pender v Lushington =

Law case

- Court: Court of Appeal
- Decided: 2 March 1877
- Citation: (1877) 6 Ch D 70

Keywords
- Vote, property, derivative claim

Pender v Lushington (1877) 6 Ch D 70 is a leading case in UK company law, which confirms that a company member's right to vote may not be interfered with, because it is a right of property. Furthermore, any interference leads to a personal right of a member to sue in his own name to enforce his right. As Lord Jessel MR put it, a member:

has a right to say, "Whether I vote in the majority or minority, you shall record my vote, as that is a right of property belonging to my interest in this company, and if you refuse to record my vote I will institute legal proceedings against you to compel you."

== Facts ==
The articles of association of the Direct United States Cable Company Ltd, registered under the Companies Act 1862 provided that no member would be allowed to vote on more than 100 shares at any meeting, and each block of ten shares was counted as one vote. It also provided that "the company shall not be affected with notice of any trust", a standard provision in company articles that is meant to allow companies to avoid complications or liability to the ultimate beneficiaries of shares.

Mr John Pender had bought 1,000 shares. He was also chairman of Globe Telegraph and Trust Company Ltd, a holding company of a large group with competitors to the Direct United States Cable Company. Mr Pender had split his votes and registered the holders under the names of a number of nominees. After more than three months he then proposed the following motion at a general meeting.

"That it is expedient to put an end to the present antagonism of this company towards the Anglo-American Telegraph Company and its connections, and to work this company's cable in friendly alliance with their lines; and that a committee of shareholders be appointed to be named by the meeting to confer with the directors as to the best method of giving effect to this resolution, and to report to the shareholders thereon at such time as the meeting shall appoint."

The opponents to the motion, including the company's directors and the chairman, Mr Lushington, proposed to amend the resolution so it had the opposite effect. Mr Pender and his nominees voted against any amendment and would have won if the votes of the nominees were counted. But Mr Lushington refused to have the nominees votes counted. He, along with other supporters of the motion sued for an injunction.

== Judgment ==
Lord Jessel MR held that Pender could have an injunction for his vote to be recorded. Pender's vote was a property right which could not be interfered with, nor were the motives in this case such as to make the vote invalid. Furthermore, as a matter of litigation, Pender could sue in the name of the company, as well as in his own name. Interference with a personal right created both a derivative claim and a personal action.

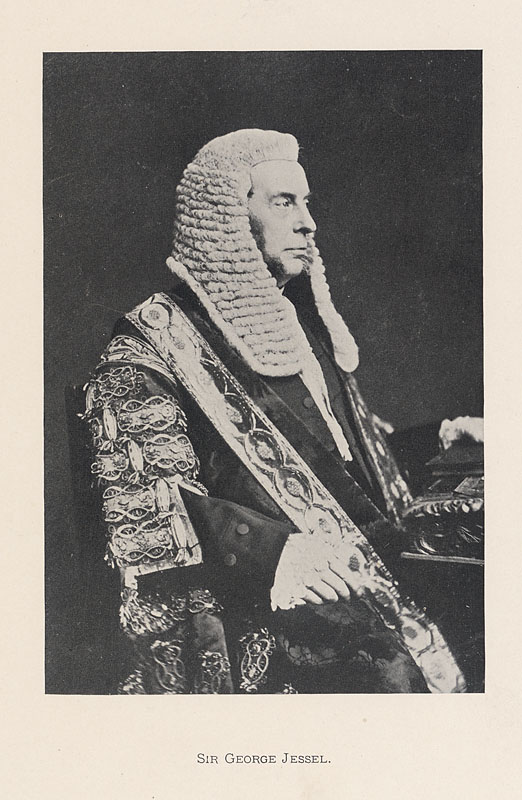
Sir George Jessel

In all cases of this kind, where men exercise their rights of property, they exercise their rights from some motive adequate or inadequate, and I have always considered the law to be that those who have the rights of property are entitled to exercise them, whatever their motives may be for such exercise—that is as regards a Court of Law as distinguished from a court of morality or conscience, if such a court exists. I put to Mr. Harrison, as a crucial test, whether, if a landlord had six tenants whose rent was in arrear, and three of them voted in a way he approved of for a member of Parliament, and three did not, the Court could restrain the landlord from distraining on the three who did not, because he did not at the same time distrain on the three who did. He admitted at once that whatever the motive might be, even if it could be proved that the landlord had distrained on them for that reason, that I could not prevent him from distraining because they had not paid their rent. I cannot deprive him of his property, although he may not make use of that right of property in a way I might altogether approve. That is really the question, because if these shareholders have a right of property, then I think all the arguments which have been addressed to me as to the motives which induced them to exercise it are entirely beside the question.

I am confirmed in that view by the case of Menier v Hooper's Telegraph Works, where Lord Justice Mellish observes: “I am of opinion that, although it may be quite true that the shareholders of a company may vote as they please, and for the purpose of their own interests, yet that the majority of shareholders cannot sell the assets of the company and keep the consideration.” In other words, he admits that a man may be actuated in giving his vote by interests entirely adverse to the interests of the company as a whole. He may think it more for his particular interest that a certain course may be taken which may be in the opinion of others very adverse to the interests of the company as a whole, but he cannot be restrained from giving his vote in what way he pleases because he is influenced by that motive. There is, if I may say so, no obligation on a shareholder of a company to give his vote merely with a view to what other persons may consider the interests of the company at large. He has a right, if he thinks fit, to give his vote from motives or promptings of what he considers his own individual interest.

This being so, the arguments which have been addressed to me as to whether or not the object for which the votes were given would bring about the ruin of the company, or whether or not the motive was an improper one which induced these gentlemen to give their votes, or whether or not their conduct shews a want of appreciation of the principles on which this company was founded, appear to me to be wholly irrelevant. Therefore I do not intend to enter into the question as to what the objects of the company were, or what was the mode in which it was proposed to carry out those objects. I am only bound to decide whether or not these people were entitled to vote. To that question I am now going to address myself.

It is admitted that the votes tendered were the votes of persons on the register of shareholders, and it is admitted that they had been possessed of those shares for at least three months previously to the time of holding the general meeting, which is what is required by the 59th article. That being so, their votes were rejected on this ground: It was said that the persons who gave the votes were trustees for other persons, and that these other persons, the cestuis que trust of those trustees, were also either holders in their own name or as cestuis que trust of other shares, amounting in the whole to more than 1000 shares, so that if all the shares to which the persons were entitled had been registered in one name, that person could not have given more than 100 votes, the 56th section of the articles saying, that every member holding at least ten shares shall have one vote for every complete number of ten shares, with this limit, that no shareholder shall be entitled to more than 100 votes in all.

Now the argument is, that the words “every member” mean, not a man registered on the list of shareholders, but any person beneficially entitled to shares, because if not carried to that extent I do not understand the argument at all. If it means that a man may hold 1000 shares beneficially, or that a man may disunite his shares, then there is no reason why he should be disqualified because he has one share in his own name or ten shares in his own name. Therefore the argument must go the whole length that any one man entitled beneficially to more than 1000 shares is not entitled to put them in the name of two or more persons as trustees for him, so as to allow those two or more persons to exercise the power of voting under the articles. It must go to that extent. But, taking even the restricted view, and reading the words “every member” to mean only a person whose name is on the register, then it means this, that any man whose name is registered as a holder of shares cannot, if he is the cestui que trust of other shares, give together with his trustee more votes than if all the shares were registered in his own name. Those are the propositions with which I must deal.

The first observation which strikes one is that these are votes at general meetings. How are you to ascertain who is to vote? That is pointed out by the articles of association. First, who are to be summoned to attend the general meetings? You find by Article 48 that notice is to be given to “the members hereinafter mentioned.” What does the word “members” mean in that article? The definition clause, like many other definition clauses, is one which defines nothing. It says: “Member means member for the time being of the company,” that is, member means member. But then one must remember that the word “member” has a meaning in the Companies Act, and it means primâ facie a registered shareholder or stockholder, and that must be the meaning here, because how else are you to give him notice at all? You can only give him notice by referring to the register which, under Article 2, is “to be kept pursuant to the terms of the Companies Act, 1862 .” So that a member is a man who is on the register.

[His Lordship then reviewed the several articles of association, which shewed that a member of this company meant a person whose name was on the register of shareholders, and that the title of any member to vote could only be found out by reference to the register. His Lordship then continued:—]

It appears to me that it is plain from reading these articles alone that the articles meant to refer to a registered member, but I think it is made, if possible, plainer—though I doubt whether it could be made plainer when you come to consider that it would not be possible to work the company in any other way, for how else could the company hold meetings or demand a poll, or have the votes taken by the scrutineers? — but if possible it is made plainer by the 19th article, which says: “The executors and administrators of a deceased member shall be the only persons recognised by the company as having any title to his share,” and also provides that “the company shall not be affected by notice of any trust.” And the 30th section of the Companies Act 1862, says: “No notice of any trust express, implied, or constructive, shall be entered on the register, or be receivable by the Registrar in the case of companies under this Act, and registered in England or Ireland .” It comes, therefore, to this, that the register of shareholders, on which there can be no notice of a trust, furnishes the only means of ascertaining whether you have a lawful meeting or a lawful demand for a poll, or of enabling the scrutineers to strike out votes.

The result appears to me to be manifest, that the company has no right whatever to enter into the question of the beneficial ownership of the shares. Any such suggestion is quite inadmissible, and therefore it is clear that the chairman had no right to inquire who was the beneficial owner of the shares, and the votes in question ought to have been admitted as good votes independently of any inquiry as to whether the parties tendering them were or were not, and to what extent, trustees for other persons beneficially entitled to the shares.

I now come to the subordinate question, not very material in the view I take of the case, namely, whether you have the right Plaintiffs here. The Plaintiffs may be described as three, though they are really two. There is, first, Mr. Pender himself, on behalf of himself; next, as the representative of the class of shareholders who voted with him, whose votes I hold to have been improperly rejected; and, next, there is the Direct United States Cable Company. It is said that the company ought not to have been made Plaintiffs.

The reasons given were reasons of some singularity, but there is no doubt of this, that under the articles the directors are the custodians of the seal of the company, and the directors, who in fact are Defendants, have certainly not given any authority to the solicitor for the Plaintiffs on this record to institute this suit in the name of the company as Plaintiffs. It is equally clear, if I am right in the conclusion to which I have come as to the impropriety of the decision of the chairman in rejecting these votes, that it is a case in which the company might properly sue as Plaintiffs to restrain the directors from carrying out a resolution which had not been properly carried, and then comes the question whether I ought or ought not to allow the company now to remain as Plaintiffs.

The first point to be considered is this: Supposing there was no objection to the right of a general meeting to direct an action to be brought, could I, even in that case, allow the company to sue? I think I could. In that case the general meeting, having a right to direct an action to be brought, would act by the majority of the members. The majority wish their rights to be protected. A meeting could be called, and, if the Court was satisfied that the majority would direct an action to be brought, the company's name would not be taken away. In the meantime the Court must act. It being decided that the company is a proper Plaintiff, that the grievance is one of which the company could complain, that the majority of the company are of that opinion, and that there is no time to call a formal meeting, what is the Court to do? Is it to refuse justice altogether, and say, it being a case for an injunction, that the directors are to have for several weeks (for the articles require three weeks' notice at least of a general meeting) the power of destroying the property and rights of the company altogether.

Such a course in cases of injunction would be equivalent to saying that there shall be no justice at all administered. It would be an absolute denial of justice, and it appears to me that the Court of Appeal, in the case of MacDougall v Gardiner, have deliberately adopted that view of the matter, as I read the following observations of Lord Justice James: “Any one of the shareholders might have filed his bill in the name of the company, and then, if the directors had said, ‘You are not the company; the majority do not act with you, but with us,’ the Court would, as it has done in other cases, have taken the means of ascertaining which party it is, the Plaintiff's or the Defendant's, which really represents the majority of the company.” I suppose he means that the Court may direct a meeting to be called. But what is the Court to do in the meantime, if it is satisfied that a real majority decided in favour of bringing an action? Surely it must do something in the meantime, and it follows, I think, from that portion of the judgment, that in the meantime the Court ought to grant the injunction to keep things in statu quo . It may be said that there is no such majority now, but it is nothing to me that the majority is changed. Therefore, while the Court directs a meeting to be called, or gives the shareholders facilities for calling a meeting, it acts in the meantime on the assumption that the majority of the former meeting have not changed their minds. Even if that is not the true meaning of the judgment, and it is not quite so explicit as I could have wished for my guidance, then the only other alternative is that it is a case in which it would be impossible for relief to be obtained by the company bringing an action, and it must be within the exception pointed out in Foss v Harbottle, that the shareholders must have a right to institute an action in the name of one or more, because otherwise it would be impossible to maintain an action at all. Therefore on that view this is a perfectly good action.

But, acting on the first view, which appears to me to be the correct one, I think I ought not on this summons to take away the name of the company, but to let the summons stand over, leaving either party to call a meeting to decide whether the company's name is to be used or not. In the meantime, whether this is an action in the name of the shareholders or in the name of the company, in either case I think there should be an injunction.

[His Lordship then adverted to a point raised in argument, whether, according to the true construction of the articles, there was not absolute power in the directors for a period of five years to do what they pleased without the control of the company, and considered that they had no such power as to prevent an action being brought against them. He then continued:—]

But there is another ground on which the action may be maintained. This is an action by Mr. Pender for himself. He is a member of the company, and whether he votes with the majority or the minority he is entitled to have his vote recorded—an individual right in respect of which he has a right to sue. That has nothing to do with the question like that raised in Foss v Harbottle and that line of cases. He has a right to say, “Whether I vote in the majority or minority, you shall record my vote, as that is a right of property belonging to my interest in this company, and if you refuse to record my vote I will institute legal proceedings against you to compel you.” What is the answer to such an action? It seems to me it can be maintained as a matter of substance, and that there is no technical difficulty in maintaining it.

Then it is said that there are several rights. No doubt they are rights of suing in a distinct character. I turn to Rules of Court, 1875, Order XVI., rule 1, and I find this: “All persons may be joined as Plaintiffs in whom the right to any relief claimed is alleged to exist, whether jointly, severally, or in the alternative.” It seems to me that this ground of defence must necessarily fail.

The only other point was as to the resolutions themselves. I am not going to give any opinion as to what the effect of the resolutions may be when passed. The only point on which I am asked to decide is to say they ought to have been passed, in other words, that there was a majority for them, and to restrain the Defendants until further order from acting in contravention of them. It follows that, whether or not any reasons can be adduced at the trial to lead me to decide that the injunction shall be further continued, at the present moment it is my duty to say that the resolutions, being on the face of them quite legal, and having been passed by a majority, ought to be obeyed by the directors. I only grant that until further order. The majority in this case, as in other cases, may change their minds; and therefore it is suggested that the following words should be introduced into the order I am about to make: “Until some other resolution shall be passed by a general meeting;” so that my injunction may go no further than the present opinion of the majority warrants. I object to that modification. I think the applicants are entitled to the order they ask, which is subject to further order. The summons will stand over till the trial or further order, with liberty to either party to call a meeting.

== See also ==
- UK company law
- UK public service law
- Ashby v White (1703) 92 ER 126
- Allen v Gold Reefs of West Africa Ltd [1900] 1 Ch 656, shareholders must, however, cast their votes bona fide for the benefit of the company as a whole
- Andrews v Gas Meter Company [1897] 1 Ch 361
- Isle of Wight Railway Company v Tahourdin (1884) LR 25 Ch D 320
