= John Kelynge =

English judge and politician

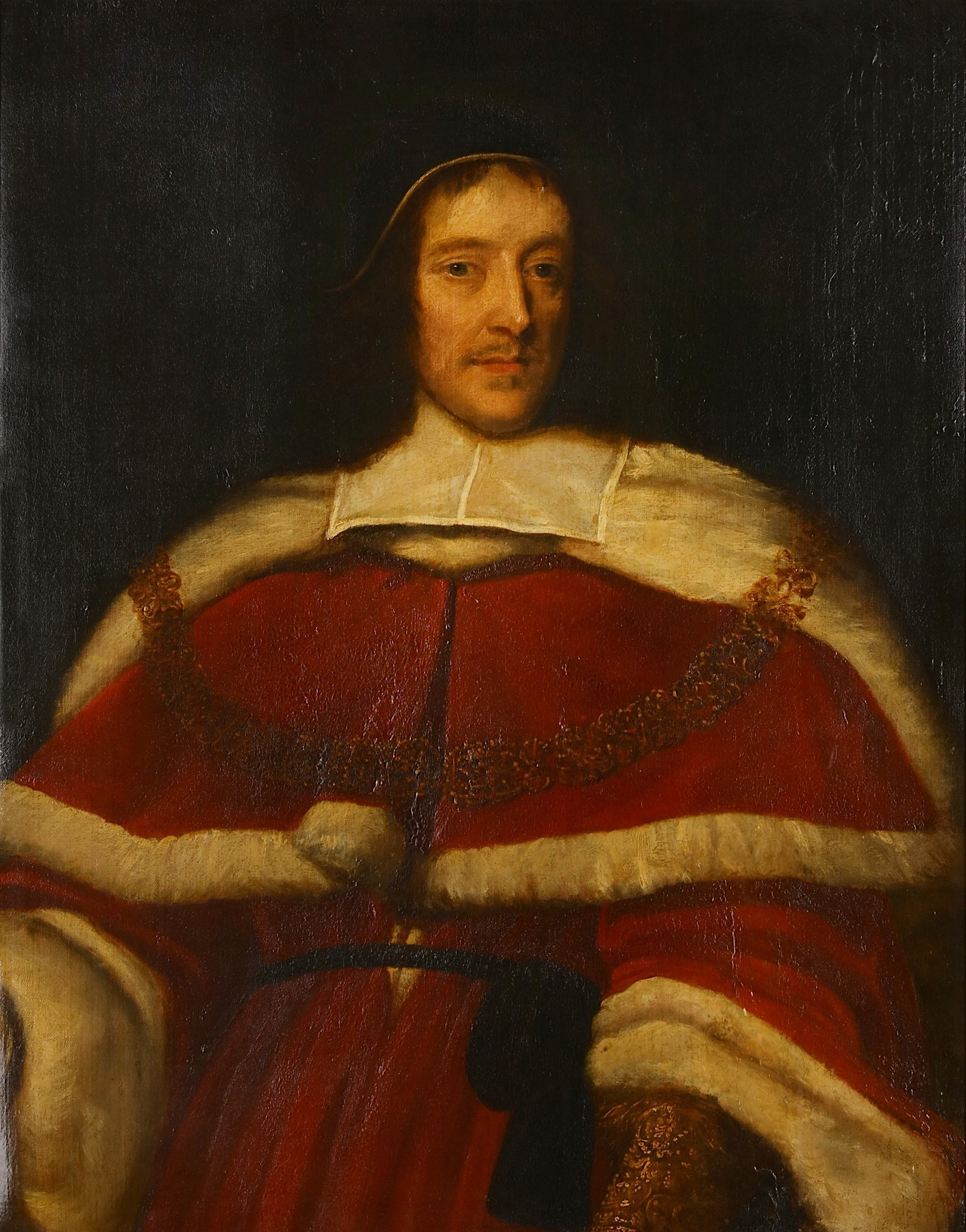
- John Kelynge

Lord Chief Justice of the King's Bench
- In office 1665–1671

Member of Parliament for Bedford
- In office 1661–1663

Personal details
- Born: 1607
- Died: 1671 (aged 63–64) London, England
- Education: Trinity College, Cambridge

John Kelynge KS (or Kelyng) (1607–1671) was an English judge and politician who sat in the House of Commons from 1661 to 1663. He became Chief Justice of the King's Bench.

== Early career ==
Kelynge was the only son of John Kelyng of Hertford and his wife Alice Waterhouse, daughter of Gregory Waterhouse of Halifax, Yorkshire. He was baptised on 19 July 1607. He matriculated from Trinity College, Cambridge at Easter 1623 and was admitted into the Inner Temple on 22 January 1624. He was called to the bar on 10 February 1632, and from this time to the Restoration, no mention is made of him in the reports. Lord Clarendon describes him to the king as "a person of eminent learning, eminent suffering, never wore his gown after the rebellion, but was always in gaol;" and he himself, on his being made a judge in 1663, speaks of his "twenty years' silence."

== Serjeant-at-law ==
With such claims it is not surprising that he was included in the first batch of new Serjeants called by Charles II on 4 July 1660, to take the degree on the following Michaelmas; and was immediately engaged on the part of the crown to advise with the judges relative to the proceedings to be adopted against the regicides. He is named as counsel on the trials of Colonel Hacker and William Heveningham; and in the next year in that of John James a fifth-monarchy man. Returned as member for Bedford to the Parliament that met in May 1661, he prepared the Act of Uniformity, passed in the next year. On 8 November, he was made king's Serjeant, and in that character was one of the counsel on the trial of Sir Harry Vane, towards whom his conduct was unfeelingly harsh and insulting.

== Judicial career ==
The resignation of Mr. Justice Malet opened the way for his further advancement, he was appointed to fill the vacant seat in the King's Bench on 18 June 1663. He was present at the noted trial of the witches at Bury before Chief Baron Hale, in March 1662. He was appointed as Hale's coadjutor on the circuit. The dissatisfaction with the verdict which he is represented to have expressed seems to proceed, not from his disbelief in the existence of witchcraft, but from his opinion that the evidence was not sufficient to convict them.

Within two years after his promotion, the death of Sir Robert Hyde made a vacancy in the office of chief justice of the King's Bench. It remained unfilled for nearly seven months, when Kelynge, on 21 November 1665, was elevated to the post. He retained it during the remainder of his life, with little reputation as a lawyer, and frequently incurring censure by his want of temper and discretion. As the Lord Chief Justice of the King's Bench, Kelynge delivered the primary judgment in the significant English common law case, Mellor v Spateman (1669) 1 Wm. Saund. 339.

== The Great Fire ==
He played a prominent role in events after the Great Fire in 1666. He presided over the trial of an innocent but insane Frenchman, Robert Hubert, who confessed to setting the fire in the King's Bakehouse in Pudding Lane. Hubert was duly found guilty by the jury and executed by order of Kelynge, even though Kelynge told the King that he did not believe a word of the confession. Kelynge later led a commission to examine numerous other witnesses and concluded that the fire was started by accident and was so calamitous because of a number of circumstances, including the very strong easterly wind. He was also appointed one of the "Fire Judges" to resolve disputes arising from the destruction caused by the Great Fire. He was among the 22 Fire Judges whose portraits were painted by Wright and which hung for centuries in London's Guildhall. The cutdown, but otherwise well preserved, remnant of the portrait now belongs to the Inner Temple, of which he was a member.

== Controversies ==
In 1664, at the Cambridge Assizes, while puisne judge, he had bound over Mr. Roger Pepys, known to readers of the Diary of Samuel Pepys as "Cousin Roger", to his good behaviour for speaking slightly of Chief Justice Hyde at a town session.

In 1667 numerous complaints and impeachment recommendations were made against him in parliament by the opposition, the "gentlemen of the county" for divers "high proceedings" in the execution of his office, such as fining of juries for bringing in verdicts contrary to the evidence, and for referring to Magna Carta as "Magna Farta" (this seems to have been a common gibe, even among judges, at the time); for which he was obliged to answer before the House of Commons. That body voted his proceedings to be illegal and tending to the introduction of arbitrary government, and at first seemed inclined to proceed with great severity, ordering that he should be brought to trial: but in the end, by the mediation of his friends, the matter was allowed to drop. Again in 1670, he was obliged to apologise publicly in the House of Lords for rudely affronting Lord Holles on a trial in the court of King's Bench. Sir Thomas Raymond however, in recording his death, calls him "a learned, faithful, and resolute judge." He collected various crown cases in which he was the judge, which were published after his death by Chief Justice Holt.

== Death and posterity ==
He died at his house in Hatton Garden on 9 May 1671, leaving a son who was named in 1660 as one of the intended knights of the Royal Oak, and who afterwards was knighted and became king's Serjeant. The family name of the mother of that son has not been found, but the register of St. Andrew's, Holborn, records her burial under her Christian name Mary on 26 September 1667; and the judge's marriage with Mrs. Elizabeth Bassett, on 23 March 1667/8. In 1684 one of his grandsons was living at Southill, Bedfordshire. Whether the William Kelynge who reported cases in the reign of George II was of the judge's family does not appear.

Parliament of England
Preceded by Sir Samuel Luke; Humphrey Winch	Member of Parliament for Bedford; 1661–1663; With: Richard Taylor	Succeeded by Richard Taylor; Paulet St John
Legal offices
Preceded by Sir Robert Hyde	Lord Chief Justice; 1665–1671	Succeeded by Sir Matthew Hale
