= Mellor v Spateman =

English common law case concerning trespass

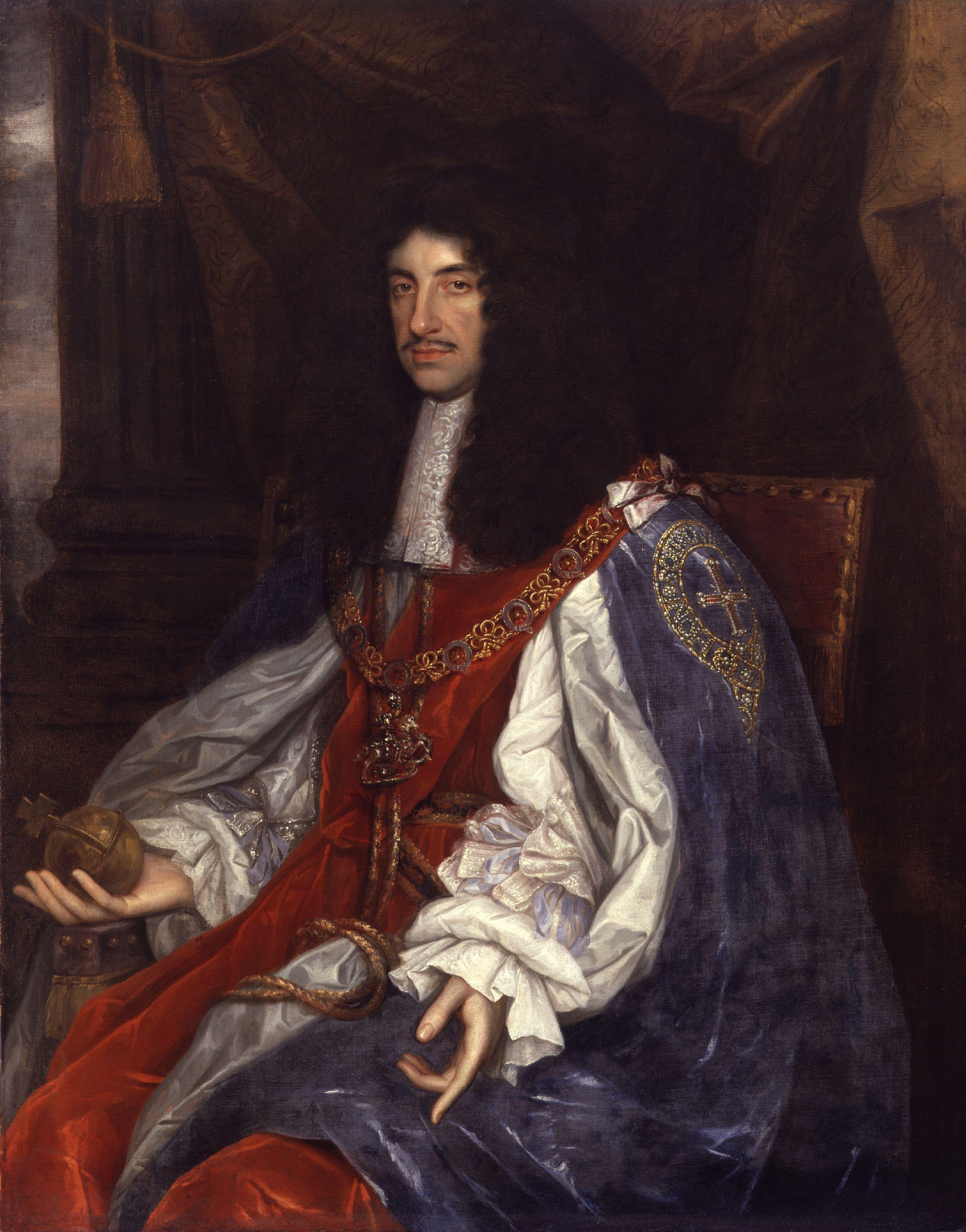
- Charles II in Garter robes by John Michael Wright or studio, c. 1660–1665
- Court: Court of King's Bench
- Decided: 1669
- Citation: (1669) 1 Wm. Saund. 339 85 Eng. Rep. 495

Case opinions
- Kelynge, C.J.

Keywords
- Common of pasture by prescription; Disturbance of common; Trespass; Levant and couchant; injuria sine damno; Profit à prendre; Profit of pasture; Right of common; Corporation has no kindred

Mellor v Spateman (1669) 1 Wm. Saund. 339, is an English common law trespass (Note: Rather than a prima facie case of trespass to land, it is more a case by a commoner for disturbance.) case heard in the Court of King's Bench where it was held that a corporation may prescribe to have a common of pasture. In relation to cattle levant and couchant within the town, a corporation may prescribe for common in gross, but not for common in gross without number. A corporation, being a body politic, has no "kindred" and therefore cannot suffer a bare injury, (Note: In 17th-century legal terms, a "bare injury" refers to an infringement of a legal right where no actual or tangible financial loss has yet occurred.) nor maintain certain actions without proving actual damage to its interests. The concept highlights the 17th-century distinction over legal standing between a corporation and a natural person.

== Background ==
The case concerned a claim of trespass by Henry Mellor against John Spateman on a common field of some 20 acres in Derby, called Littlefield. It was claimed that the defendant forcibly entered the close (Note: "Close", old English term for an estate.) and allowed horses, bulls, swine and sheep to consume and tread down the grass.

The defendant pleaded not guilty to trespass with his cattle, but to the count of trespass with his two geldings and two mares, Mellor declared to the court that he was a burgess of the ancient borough of Derby at the time of the alleged trespass and for some time before, and due to an earlier change of name of the corporation to the name of mayor and burgesses, the defendant laid a prescription for common in the corporation. In particular, the defendant relied on said corporation being permitted to have other names, such as "bailiffs" and "burgesses", which extended the right to graze commonable cattle in the pasture at Littlefield. A change of name, or alteration, did not mean that a corporation would necessarily lose its franchises.

The question was raised as to whether cattle which did not belong to the corporation could feed on the common and consume the fruit of the land - in this case, the grass. It had long been established that the right to have an unlimited number of livestock grazing in a pasture would usurp the land, so a cap on the number of animals which could be supported throughout the winter was imposed.

== Judgment ==
The court found for the plaintiff because the defendant's plea was deemed to be bad for having omitted the words "levant and couchant within the town". Kelynge, C.J., stated that the common had not been destroyed and the judgment against the defendant was solely as a result of the fault in the plea.

Another outcome of the case was that a profit à prendre could only be created by grant or prescription. A distinction was drawn between an "easement", such as the custom of people drawing water from a well or spring, and a profit à prendre. Since an "easement" would not have been capable of giving rise to a profit à prendre, the right could only have been supported by a "grant in gross" or prescription. For a profit à prendre to be created in common law by prescription, it is necessary to demonstrate to the court that the "profit" had been in continuous use since time immemorial.

Kelynge, C.J., held that there could not be any common in gross without number. For cattle to be deemed levant and couchant in the town, there could not be "any common in gross without number" and the court felt that the plea should not have omitted the wording "levant et couchant within the town".

So in the case of Mellor v Spateman, 1 Saund. 343, where the Corporation of Derby claim common by prescription, and though the inheritance of the common be in the body politic, yet the particular members enjoy the fruit and benefit of it, and put in their own cattle to feed on the common, and not the cattle belonging to the corporation; ...

— Lord Holt CJ, Ashby v White (1703)

As part of the judgment, the King's Bench recorded that: "The plaintiff must not only allege that he has a right of common for cattle levant and couchant, but must also prove it, by shewing himself in possession of some land, whereon the cattle may be levant and couchant." Levancy and couchancy was taken as the right of common for commonable cattle, where the possession of such land rested on it being capable of sustaining the 'commoned' livestock throughout the winter. The right of common had to be regulated by levancy and couchancy within the town, otherwise the corporation would in effect 'surcharge the common'.

== 'Kindred' and corporate standing ==
In his judgment, Kelynge, C.J., addressed the unique legal status of a corporation as a "body politic" rather than a natural person. A central difficulty was that "the corporation itself cannot have any kindred". The court had to determine if the "fruit and benefit" of the land could be enjoyed by burgesses even though the legal "inheritance" of the right belonged to the corporation as a whole, and in particular, whether the corporation could claim a right of common for its individual members. The lack of kindred meant that while a corporation could hold the inheritance of a right (such as a common of pasture), it could not experience a "bare injury" in the same way an individual could. Consequently, the lack of corporate kindred meant that while the corporation held the right in its political capacity, it could not maintain an action for a 'bare injury' without proving actual damage to its collective interests.

== See also ==
- Ashby v White – A landmark 1703 case regarding the relationship between legal rights and remedies.
- Corporate personhood – The history of the legal fiction that a corporation has a distinct personality from its members.
- Prescription (law) – The method of acquiring a right through long-standing custom.
- Profit à prendre – The legal right to take natural resources (such as grass for grazing) from another's land.
- Ubi jus, ibi remedium – The legal maxim that "where there is a right, there is a remedy."
