= John Earle (bishop) =

17th-century English bishop

The Right Reverend John Earle
- Bishop of Salisbury
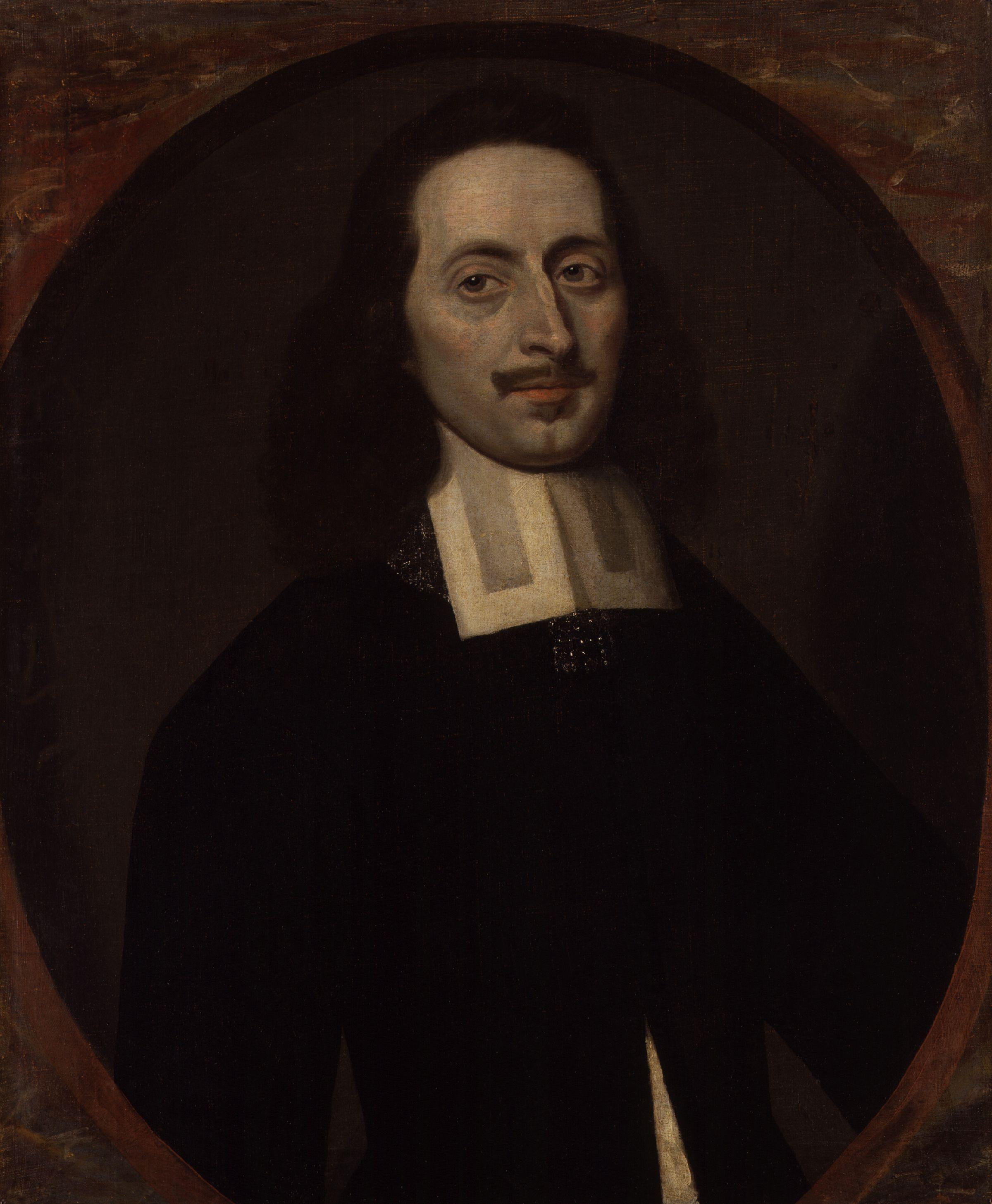
- Portrait of John Earle, circa 1660
- Installed: 1663
- Term ended: 1665
- Predecessor: Humphrey Henchman
- Successor: Alexander Hyde
- Other post: Bishop of Worcester

Orders
- Consecration: 30 November 1662 by Gilbert Sheldon

Personal details
- Born: 1601 York, England
- Died: 17 November 1665 (aged 63–64) Oxford
- Denomination: Church of England
- Education: Christ Church, Oxford

John Earle (c. 1601 – 17 November 1665) was an English cleric, author and translator, who was chaplain to Charles II. Towards the end of his life he was Bishop of Worcester and then Salisbury.

== Life ==
He was born at York, but the exact date is unknown. He matriculated at Christ Church, Oxford, but moved to Merton, where he obtained a fellowship. In 1631 he was proctor and also chaplain to Philip Herbert, 4th Earl of Pembroke, then chancellor of the university, which led in 1639 to incumbency of the rectory of Bishopston in Wiltshire.

His fame spread, and in 1641 he was appointed chaplain and tutor to the future Charles II of England. In 1643 he was elected one of the Westminster Assembly, but his sympathies with Charles I of England and with the Anglican Communion were so strong that he declined to sit. Early in 1643 he was chosen chancellor of Salisbury Cathedral, but he was soon deprived of this position as a "malignant." After the final Royalist defeat at the Battle of Worcester, Earle went abroad, and was made Clerk of the Closet (1651–1664) and chaplain to his former student Charles II.

He spent a year at Antwerp in the house of Izaak Walton's friend, George Morley. He then joined the Duke of York (the future James II) in Paris, returning to England at the Restoration. He was appointed dean of Westminster, and in 1661 was one of the commissioners for revising the liturgy. He was on friendly terms with Richard Baxter. In November 1662 he was consecrated Bishop of Worcester, and was translated, ten months later, to the see of Salisbury, where he conciliated the nonconformists. He was strongly opposed to the Conventicle Act and Five Mile Act. During the Great Plague of London in 1665 – 1666, Earle attended to Charles II and his Queen consort Catherine of Braganza at Oxford, and there he died.

Edward Hyde, 1st Earl of Clarendon, in his Life, wrote "Dr Earle was a man of great piety and devotion, a most eloquent and powerful preacher, and of a conversation so pleasant and delightful, so very innocent, and so very facetious, that no man’s company was more desired and loved. No man was more negligent in his dress and habit and mien, no man more wary and cultivated in his behaviour and discourse. He was very dear to the Lord Falkland, with whom he spent as much time as he could make his own."

== Works ==
Earle's chief title to remembrance is his witty and humorous work, Microcosmographie, or a Peece of the World discovered, in Essayes and Characters, which throws light on the manners of the time. First published anonymously in 1628, it became very popular, and ran through ten editions in the lifetime of the author. The style is quaint and epigrammatic: "A university dunner is a gentlemen follower cheaply purchased, for his own money has hyr'd him." Several reprints of the book have been issued since the author's death; and in 1671 a French translation by James Dymocke appeared with the title of Le Vice ridicule.

Earle was employed by Charles II to make the Latin translation of the Eikon Basilike, published in 1649. A similar translation of Richard Hooker's Ecclesiastical Polity was accidentally destroyed.

== Notes ==
Church of England titles
Preceded by Richard Steward	Dean of Westminster; 1660–1662	Succeeded by John Dolben
Preceded by John Gauden	Bishop of Worcester; 1662–1663	Succeeded by Robert Skinner
Preceded by Humphrey Henchman	Bishop of Salisbury; 1663–1665	Succeeded by Alexander Hyde
