= Sealed Knot =

British political group

The Sealed Knot was a secret Royalist association which plotted for the Restoration of the monarchy during the English Interregnum. The group was commissioned by King Charles II between November 1653 and February 1654 from his exile in Paris for the purpose of coordinating underground Royalist activity in England and preparing for a general uprising against the Protectorate.

== Members ==
Its original founding members were:

- John Belasyse, 1st Baron Belasyse (1614–1689)
- Sir William Compton (1625–1663; third son of Spencer Compton, 2nd Earl of Northampton)
- Henry Hastings, 1st Baron Loughborough (1610–1666)
- Col. John Russell (1620–1687)
- Col. Sir Edward Villiers (1620–1689; father of Edward Villiers, 1st Earl of Jersey)
- Sir Richard Willis (sometimes spelt 'Willys') (1613/14–1690)

Additional members include:

- Susan Hyde (c. 1607 – 1656)
- Elizabeth Maitland, Lady Tollemache (unclear)
- William Maynard, 2nd Baron Maynard

== Uprisings ==
The Sealed Knot made ten attempts between 1652 and 1659 to bring about the Restoration. The largest uprisings were staged in 1655 and 1659:

- Penruddock uprising (1655), named after one of the leaders of the revolt, John Penruddock. The revolt was easily put down by forces loyal to the Lord Protector Oliver Cromwell, and for his part in the rebellion Penruddock was beheaded in May 1655. The conspiracy was ultimately ineffective, partly because of an abundance of caution, but not least due to the treachery of Willis, who was feeding information to Cromwell's spymaster John Thurloe from at least 1656, for reasons which remain unknown.
- Booth's uprising (1659) occurred after the death of Oliver Cromwell. The conspiracy was known to Thurloe and the Royalists under the command of Sir George Booth, and was militarily defeated on 19 August at the Battle of Winnington Bridge by a New Model Army contingent under the command of General John Lambert.

== See also ==
- Secret society
