= Nicholas Hyde =

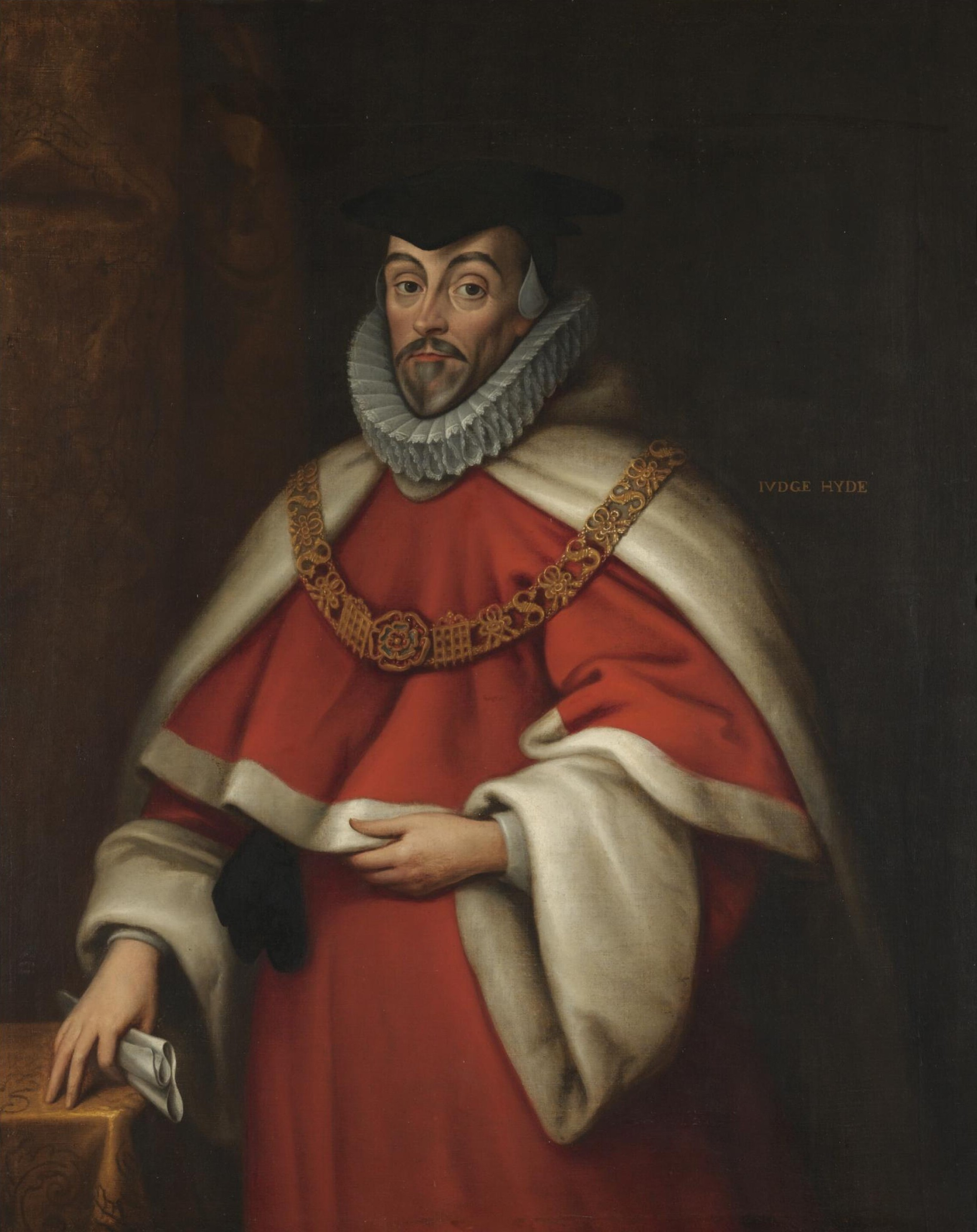
Sir Nicholas Hyde, Lord Chief Justice

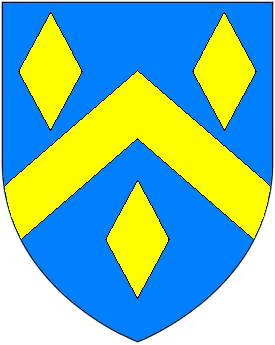
Arms of Hyde: Azure, a chevron between three lozenges or

Sir Nicholas Hyde (c. 1572 – 25 August 1631) was Lord Chief Justice of England.

== Origins ==
Hyde was born at Wardour, in Wiltshire, a son of Lawrence Hyde (d. 1590) of West Hatch, Wiltshire, MP for Heytesbury in 1584, by his second wife Anne Sibell, daughter of Nicholas Sibell of Farningham, Kent, and widow of Matthew Colthurst of Claverton, Somerset. He was the brother of Henry Hyde (c.1563–1634), MP, and Lawrence Hyde (1562–1641), attorney-general to Anne of Denmark, wife of King James I.

== Education ==
Hyde joined Exeter College, Oxford in May of 1590 and following the examples of his two older brothers, entered the Middle Temple on 14 July 1591, although he was not admitted to a chamber there for another three years. He was called to the bar in 1598.

== Career ==
Hyde entered the House of Commons in 1597 as one of the two members for Old Sarum. He represented Andover in 1601, Christchurch in 1604, Bath in 1614 and the county seat of Bristol in 1625. He soon became prominent as an opponent of the king's court, although he does not appear to have distinguished himself in the law.

Before long, however, he deserted the popular party and in 1626 was employed by George Villiers, 1st Duke of Buckingham, to defend him against impeachment by the House of Commons.

In the following year, he was appointed a Serjeant-at-law and Chief Justice of the King's Bench, in which office it fell to him to give judgment in the celebrated case of Sir Thomas Darnell and others who had been committed to prison on warrants signed by members of the Privy Council, and which contained no statement of the nature of the charge against the prisoners. In answer to the writ of habeas corpus the Attorney General relied on the Royal Prerogative, supported by a precedent of Queen Elizabeth's reign.

Hyde, with three other judges concurring, decided in favour of the Crown but without going so far as to declare the right of the Crown to refuse indefinitely to show cause against the discharge of the prisoners. He was knighted the same year (1627).

In 1629, Hyde was one of the judges who condemned Eliot, Holles and Valentine for conspiracy in parliament to resist the King's orders, refusing to admit their plea of parliamentary privilege that they could not be called upon to answer out of parliament for acts done in parliament.

== Family ==
He married Mary Swayne, daughter of Arthur Swayne of Sarson in Amport, Hampshire. They had one surviving daughter and three surviving sons together. One of their sons, Lawrence (c.1610–1682) sat in Parliament for Winchester.

== Death ==
On 25 August 1631, he died of gaol fever at his home in Hinton Daubney, Catherington, Hampshire. He is buried with his wife in a tomb inside All Saints Church, Catherington. Two sons, Francis and Robert, and daughter Elizabeth predeceased him from the plague in 1626.

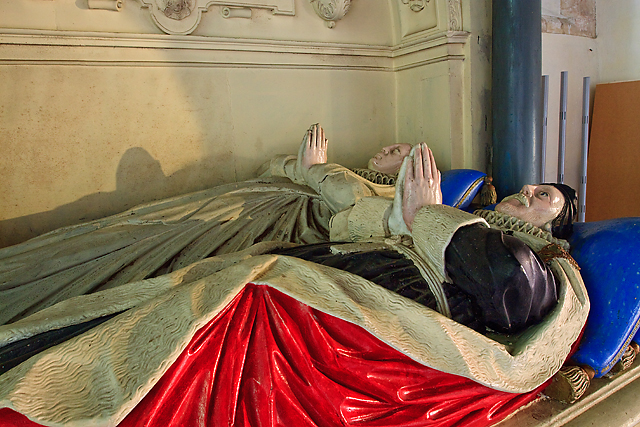
Tomb of Sir Nicholas Hyde and his wife

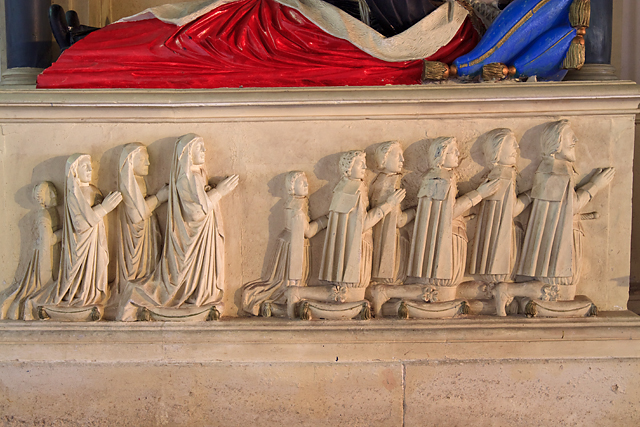
Detail of tomb

Legal offices
Preceded by Ranulph Crewe	Lord Chief Justice; 1627–1631	Succeeded by Thomas Richardson
