= Henry Hyde (died 1634) =

Member of the Parliament of England

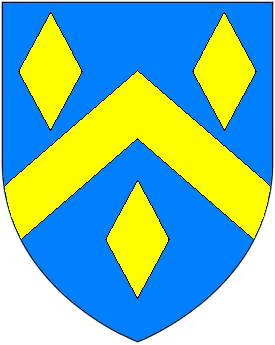
- Arms of Hyde: Azure, a chevron between three lozenges or

Member of the English Parliament for Ludgershall
- In office 1588–1589 Serving with Carew Raleigh
- Preceded by: Ambrose Coppinger; John Kingsmill
- Succeeded by: Edward Thornborough; Chidiock Wardour

Member of the English Parliament for Old Sarum
- Preceded by: William Blaker; Nicholas Hyde
- Succeeded by: William Ravenscroft; Edward Leache

Personal details
- Born: c. 1563
- Died: 29 September 1634
- Children: Edward Hyde, 1st Earl of Clarendon; Susan Hyde
- Parent: Lawrence Hyde I (father)
- Relatives: Nicholas Hyde (brother); Lawrence Hyde II (brother)

Henry Hyde (c. 1563 – 29 September 1634) was an English lawyer and member of Parliament. He was the father of Edward Hyde, 1st Earl of Clarendon (1609–1674), and thus was great-grandfather of two British monarchs, Queen Mary II and Queen Anne. He lived at Dinton and later at Purton, both in Wiltshire.

== Origins ==
Hyde was born circa 1563, the son of Lawrence Hyde I (d. 1590), MP, by his wife Anne Sybill. His brothers were Sir Nicholas Hyde (c. 1572 – 1631), Lord Chief Justice of England (1627–1631) and Lawrence Hyde II (1562–1641), attorney-general to Anne of Denmark, wife of King James I.

== Career ==
He matriculated at Magdalen College, Oxford (then Magdalen Hall), aged 16 in 1579. He graduated BA in 1581, and was raised to the degree of MA in 1584. He entered the Middle Temple and practised as a lawyer. He was Member of Parliament for Ludgershall in 1588–9, and Old Sarum in 1601.

== Character ==
Clarendon venerated his father's memory, describing him as the best of fathers and friends, and remarked that none of the honours he received through his life equalled that of being his father's son. His one surviving letter, to his brother Nicholas, suggests a kindly, good-humoured country gentleman, with a concern for the welfare of the poor not always shared by members of his class.

== Marriage and children ==
On 3 April 1597 he married Mary Langford, daughter of Edward Langford and Mary St. Barbe. Their children were:

- Anne Hyde (c.1598–?), also known as Jane Silverster.
- Elizabeth.
- Lawrence (1600–?).
- Henry (1601–1627).
- Mary (1603–?).
- Sibble (1605–?).
- Susan Hyde (c.1607–1656), spy for Charles II while exiled in France.
- Edward Hyde, 1st Earl of Clarendon (1609–1674), eldest son and heir, Lord Chancellor of England during the reign of Charles II.
- Nicholas (1610–1611).
