= Samuel Luke =

English politician and soldier (1603–1670)

Member of Parliament for Bedford
- In office 1640–1648; 1660-1661

Personal details
- Born: 21 March 1603
- Died: 30 August 1670 (aged 67)
- Spouse: Elizabeth Freeman (m. 1624)
- Parent: Oliver Luke (father)
- Relatives: Valentine Knightley (grandfather)
- Military career
- Allegiance: Parliamentarians
- Wars: English Civil War

Sir Samuel Luke (21 March 1603 – 30 August 1670) sat in the House of Commons from 1640 to 1653 and in 1660, and was an officer in the Parliamentary army during the English Civil War.

== Life ==
Luke was born 21 March 1603 and baptised at six days old in Southill, Bedfordshire. He was the son of Sir Oliver Luke MP and his wife, Elizabeth, daughter and coheir of Sir Valentine Knightley of Fawsley, Northants. He attended Eton from 1617 to 1619 and travelled abroad in 1623. He was knighted on 20 July 1624. In April 1640, Luke was elected Member of Parliament for Bedford in the Short Parliament and was re-elected for the Long Parliament in November 1640. In the latter election he is known to have had the support of much of John Bunyan's future congregation.

Luke was governor of the Parliamentary outpost in Newport Pagnell, Buckinghamshire from late 1642 until June 1644 during the English Civil War During the war he was also Scoutmaster to the Earl of Essex. (Note: William Everard, who went on to be a leader of the Diggers, was one of Luke's scouts.) He subscribed to the Solemn League and Covenant and in 1648 was secluded from the Long Parliament under Pride's Purge.

Luke inherited the family estate on the death of his father in 1651. In April 1660, he was re-elected MP for Bedford in the Convention Parliament. He died in 1670 and was buried on 30 August in Cople, Bedfordshire.

== Mention in literature ==
It is thought that Sir Samuel Luke was the basis for the title character of the satirical heroic poem Hudibras (1662) by Samuel Butler.

== Family ==
On 2 February 1624, Luke married Elizabeth, daughter of William Freeman, haberdasher and merchant, of London.

== Notes ==
Parliament of England
Vacant Parliament suspended since 1629	Member of Parliament for Bedford; 1640–1648; With: Sir Beauchamp St John	Succeeded by Sir Beauchamp St John; Richard Edwards
Vacant Not represented in Restored Rump	Member of Parliament for Bedford; 1660–1661; With: Humphrey Winch	Succeeded by Richard Taylor; John Kelynge
