= Laurence Hyde =

Laurence Hyde may refer to:

- Laurence Hyde, 1st Earl of Rochester (1641–1711)
- Laurence Hyde (artist) (1914–1987), Canadian film maker, painter and graphic artist

== See also ==
- Laurance M. Hyde (1892–1978), American jurist, chief justice of the Missouri Supreme Court
- Lawrence Hyde (disambiguation)
- Larry Hyde from Morbid Obscenity
