= Susan Hyde (spy) =

English spy (1607–1656)

- Born: c. July 1607
- Died: 23 September 1656 (aged 49); Lambeth Palace, Lambeth, London
- Relatives: Henry Hyde (father); Edward Hyde (brother)
- Military career
- Allegiance: Cavaliers (Sealed Knot)

Susan Hyde (c. July 1607 – 23 September 1656) (Note: All dates in this article unless otherwise noted are given in the Julian calendar with the start of year adjusted to 1 January (see Old Style and New Style dates).) was an English noblewoman and spy. Hyde was active during the time of the Protectorate after the English monarchy had been overthrown in the English Civil War (1642–1651). She worked as an intelligence-gatherer for the exiled royal claimant Charles II as part of the secret organization the Sealed Knot and was instrumental in organizing communication between England and its members. Hyde was captured in September 1656 and died after being subjected to psychological and perhaps physical torture.

== Personal life ==
Susan Hyde was born c. July 1607, being baptized on 22 July. Her father was the politician Henry Hyde and her mother was Mary Langford. Susan was the sister of Edward Hyde, 1st Earl of Clarendon, an important English statesman in the seventeenth century. Burke's Peerage states that Susan married Kympton Mabbott, son of the journalist and publisher Gilbert Mabbot, and had a daughter, Diana, with him. This information is considered questionable since contemporary documents suggest that Kympton and Diana were siblings, not father and daughter. It is more likely that Hyde remained unmarried throughout her life.

== Espionage ==
=== The Sealed Knot ===
Hyde's career as a spy began in the aftermath of the English Civil War (1642–1651), which saw the English monarchy being overthrown and replaced by a republic headed by Oliver Cromwell. Hyde was part of the secret royalist organization the Sealed Knot and was, as revealed by her letters, in direct contact with the exiled royal claimant Charles II, who in the organization used the alias "Francis Edwards". The Sealed Knot was formed at some point between November 1653 and February 1654 and had three objectives: to be in charge of any royalist plot (the royalists themselves often being divided and scattered), to prevent "impossible undertakings", and to stop attempts to overthrow Oliver Cromwell that were deemed to be too desperate and absurd.

The Sealed Knot had several female members. Female spies were employed since their letters were often not examined as closely as those written by men given that they were most often thought to be simply of domestic nature. Hyde was part of the Sealed Knot from the very beginning, having written letters to later leading members already in July 1653, months before the Sealed Knot formed. Her brother was a key figure in its inception, and Hyde seems to have operated in the underbelly of the organization. Hyde was among the agents instrumental in organizing the communication between England and the exiled members of the Sealed Knot, critical to the organization's intelligence gathering.

Unfortunately for Hyde, the Sealed Knot had underestimated Cromwell's agents, who intercepted her letters even before the Sealed Knot was formed. Some of Hyde's movements can be reconstructed from her surviving letters. She stayed near Baynard's Castle in London. Around July/August 1656, she moved from Hart Hall in Oxford, one of her brother's previous residences, to Grittenham, where she stayed with Ms. K. Ayliffe, presumably a relative of Anne Ayliffe, her brother's first wife. Hyde used many different aliases, including "Mistress Simburbe", "Mistress St Barbe" and "Mistress Edwards". She also sometimes used the alias "Ms. Gotherintone", posing as "Wollendraper at the signe of the Ravene in Paules Church-yarde".

On 13 September 1656, Hyde wrote to Charles II, noting that she was in Wiltshire and warning the would-be-king of a possible double agent in their ranks. She appears to have been on the trail of Robert Honywood, who, through modern research, has been proven to have been among Cromwell's spies.

=== Capture and death ===
Hyde's espionage career came to an end in late 1656. She was at this time aware that her letters were being intercepted but not that she was under significant threat. Another spy employed by the Sealed Knot, the apothecary Anthony Hinton, was apprehended on 15 September 1656. A letter written by Hyde was found on his person. Hyde had used Hinton's pharmacy or home as a clearing house for her letters for more than four years and a base of operations from which to finance the exiled court of Charles II, something Hinton revealed to investigators after lengthy interrogation by John Thurloe, Council of State. Hyde was not the only spy using Hinton's services, nor the only one he gave up during interrogation.

In late September 1656, after having stayed at Grittenham for five weeks and preparing to travel to London, Hyde was roughly arrested by three officers who searched her room and her pockets. After being apprehended, Hyde was brought to Marlborough, without food or sleep, and forced to stand before a council for two hours without being spoken to. After this, she was taken to a house in Westminster and kept in secure custody. When she asked for a pen and paper, one of her guards angrily walked into her cell and threatened her with a musket to such an extent that Hyde began to tremble and was rendered unable to speak; in the meantime, other guards removed her clothes. Throughout her captivity, the guards repeatedly threatened to kill her and tear her into pieces. She was then taken to Lambeth Palace, reportedly having been scared into insanity, and died a week later on 23 September (3 October in the modern Gregorian calendar). Her body was "conveyed away by stealth" by some of her friends and buried at an unknown location.

It is unclear why Hyde was handled so roughly. At the time, women were rarely imprisoned. Instead of the usual civility accorded to noblewomen, she was subjected to psychological and perhaps physical torture. It is possible that her rough treatment can be attributed to a vendetta between Oliver Cromwell and Edward Hyde; Hyde was arrested just over a month after her brother had published a mocking answer to one of Cromwell's declarations, in which he had written that to become a martyr was a glorious fate. Cromwell may have had Hyde roughly handled and killed to demonstrate that it was not.

== Legacy ==
Hyde was long forgotten in history, due to both lacklustre treatments by contemporary authors and imprecision on the part of historians in the twentieth century, who often glossed over female figures. She was briefly mentioned in a historical survey of Lambeth Palace, but it failed to mention her relation to her brother Edward and incorrectly noted her name as having been Mrs. Anne Hyde. One of the biographers of Edward mentions Susan and her death only in a single paragraph, without mentioning her name. Although Hyde's intelligence-gathering had been essential for her brother, Edward Hyde made no mention of his sister in his later autobiographical writings. Consequently, few authors reported on Edward Hyde having had a sister, and none reported she had been a spy, nor the gruesome way in which she died.

Hyde was first brought to historical attention in 2018 through being devoted a chapter in the Dutch historian Nadine Akkerman's book Invisible Agents, in which her story was reconstructed from preserved contemporary letters and reports. Hyde is alongside fellow royalist spy Diana Jennings a main character in the historical fiction novel Killing Beauties (2020) by Pete Langman, inspired by Akkerman's research in Invisible Agents.
