= Robert Foster (judge) =

English judge

Sir Robert Foster (1589–1663) was an English judge and Chief Justice of the King's Bench.

== Early career ==
Foster was the youngest son of Sir Thomas Foster, a judge of the common pleas in the time of James I. He was born in 1589, admitted a member of the Inner Temple in 1604, and called to the bar in January 1610. He was reader in the autumn of 1631, and with ten others received the degree of serjeant-at-law on 30 May 1636. On 27 January 1640 he succeeded Sir George Vernon as a justice of the Common Pleas and was knighted.

== Conduct during the Civil War and Protectorate ==
He was an ardent royalist, is supposed to have defended ship money and billeting of troops, and joined king Charles I of England at Oxford on his retreat thither, but he was one of those judges for whose continuance in office the British House of Commons petitioned in 1643. At Oxford he attempted without success to hold a Court of Common Pleas. On 31 January 1643 he received the degree of D.C.L. He was one of the judges who tried and condemned Captain Turpin in 1644, and although the House of Commons ordered Serjeant Glanville, his colleague in that case, to be impeached for high treason, Foster was only removed, and with the four other judges of the Common Pleas disabled from his office "as if dead", for adherence to the king. He compounded for his estates by paying a large fine. After the death of Charles I, Foster lived in retirement, and, being a deep black letter lawyer, practised in the Temple as a chamber counsel and conveyancer. He had received on 14 October 1656 a license from Oliver Cromwell and council to come to London on private business and stay there, notwithstanding the late proclamation.

== Chief Justice ==
At the Restoration he was at once restored to the bench, 31 May 1660, and, having shown zeal on the trials of the regicides, was presently (21 October 1660) appointed to the chief-justiceship of the King's Bench, which had remained vacant for want of a suitable person to fill it. He dealt sternly with political prisoners. Many Fifth-monarchy men and the Quakers, John Crook, Grey, Bolton, and Tonge, accused of a plot against the king's life, were tried by him, and in the case of Sir Harry Vane he not only browbeat the prisoner on the trial, but induced the king to sanction the execution against his inclination and word and the petition of both houses of parliament. On 1 July 1663 he tried Sir Charles Sedley for indecent behaviour, and 'rebuked him severely.' He died on circuit, 4 October 1663, and was buried under a tomb bearing a bust of him in robes, at Egham, Surrey.

== Private life ==
Foster married Elizabeth, the daughter of Sir Edward Burton of Bourne, Sussex. He left a son Thomas, afterwards a knight, to whom his house, Great Foster House, Egham, descended.

Legal offices
Preceded by Sir Richard Newdigate	Lord Chief Justice; 1660–1663	Succeeded by Sir Robert Hyde
