= Lawrence Hyde (died 1590) =

English politician

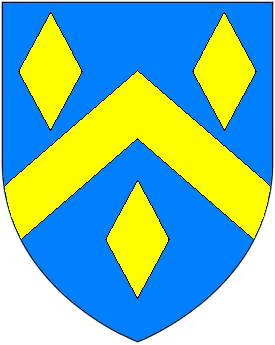
Arms of Hyde: Azure, a chevron between three lozenges or

Lawrence Hyde I (died 1590) was an MP who founded the influential Hyde family of Wiltshire. He was the great-great-grandfather, through his son Henry Hyde, of two British monarchs, Queen Mary II and Queen Anne.

== Origins ==
He was the son of Robert Hyde of Norbury, Cheshire by his 2nd or 3rd wife Katherine Boydell, daughter of a certain Boydell of Pulcroft, Cheshire.

== Career ==
During the reign of King Henry VIII, he was a clerk in the auditor’s office of the Exchequer. He was first employed in Wiltshire by the influential Sir John Thynne of Longleat. Following the Dissolution of the Monasteries, he served as a commissioner for the surveying and suppression of chantries in Wiltshire and Salisbury in 1548. At some time before 1552, he was appointed auditor to Edward Seymour, 1st Earl of Hertford, uncle of King Edward VI. He served as surveyor of crown lands in Somerset after 1575. He was a JP for Dorset and/or Wiltshire in about 1589. He was elected MP for Malmesbury in 1559, Heytesbury in 1584 and possibly for Chippenham in 1586, which tenure may be confused with that of his son Lawrence II.

== Lands acquired ==
His various positions enabled him to acquire much land, much due to the Dissolution of the Monasteries. In 1549, for about £1,250, he purchased lands in Bymerton, Milton, a house in Salisbury and elsewhere in Wiltshire, and small properties in Somerset, Derbyshire and Kent. His principal acquisitions included:

- Dinton, Wiltshire, the rectory and advowson of which he acquired in 1585 from Henry Herbert, 2nd Earl of Pembroke (1534–1601). His eldest son Robert I Hyde sold them in 1594 to his brother Sir Lawrence II Hyde (1562–1641), attorney-general to Anne of Denmark, wife of King James I.
- West Hatch, acquired circa 1570
- Tisbury, acquired circa 1570
- Gussage St. Michael, purchased during the reign of King Edward VI (1547–1553)
- Wardour Castle, Wiltshire, the lease of which he held for a short time before 1569 in right of his wife.

== Marriages ==
Hyde married twice:

- Firstly to Mary Hartgill, daughter of William Hartgill of Kilmington, Wiltshire (formerly in Somerset), by whom he had one son who predeceased him.
- Secondly in about 1559 to Anne Sibell, daughter of Nicholas Sibell of Farningham, Kent, and widow of Matthew Colthurst (c.1517-1559), MP, of Wardour Castle, Wiltshire and Claverton, Somerset. She brought with her "a fair fortune", in the form of an inheritance from her former husband, consisting mainly of lands in Wiltshire. By Anne, he had at least two daughters, one Joanna married Edward Younge of Durnford in Wiltshire in Tisbury in 1585, and the following sons:
  - Robert Hyde, eldest son and heir
  - Henry Hyde (c.1563-1634), MP, father of Edward Hyde, 1st Earl of Clarendon (1609–1674).
  - Sir Lawrence Hyde (1562–1641), Attorney-general to Anne of Denmark, wife of King James I.
  - Sir Nicholas Hyde (c.1572–1631), Lord Chief Justice of England.

== Death and burial ==
Hyde died on 7 June 1590 and was buried at Tisbury, where a monument survives and mentions his son Henry, the father of Lord Clarendon.
