= Knights of the Royal Oak =

Proposed English order of knighthood

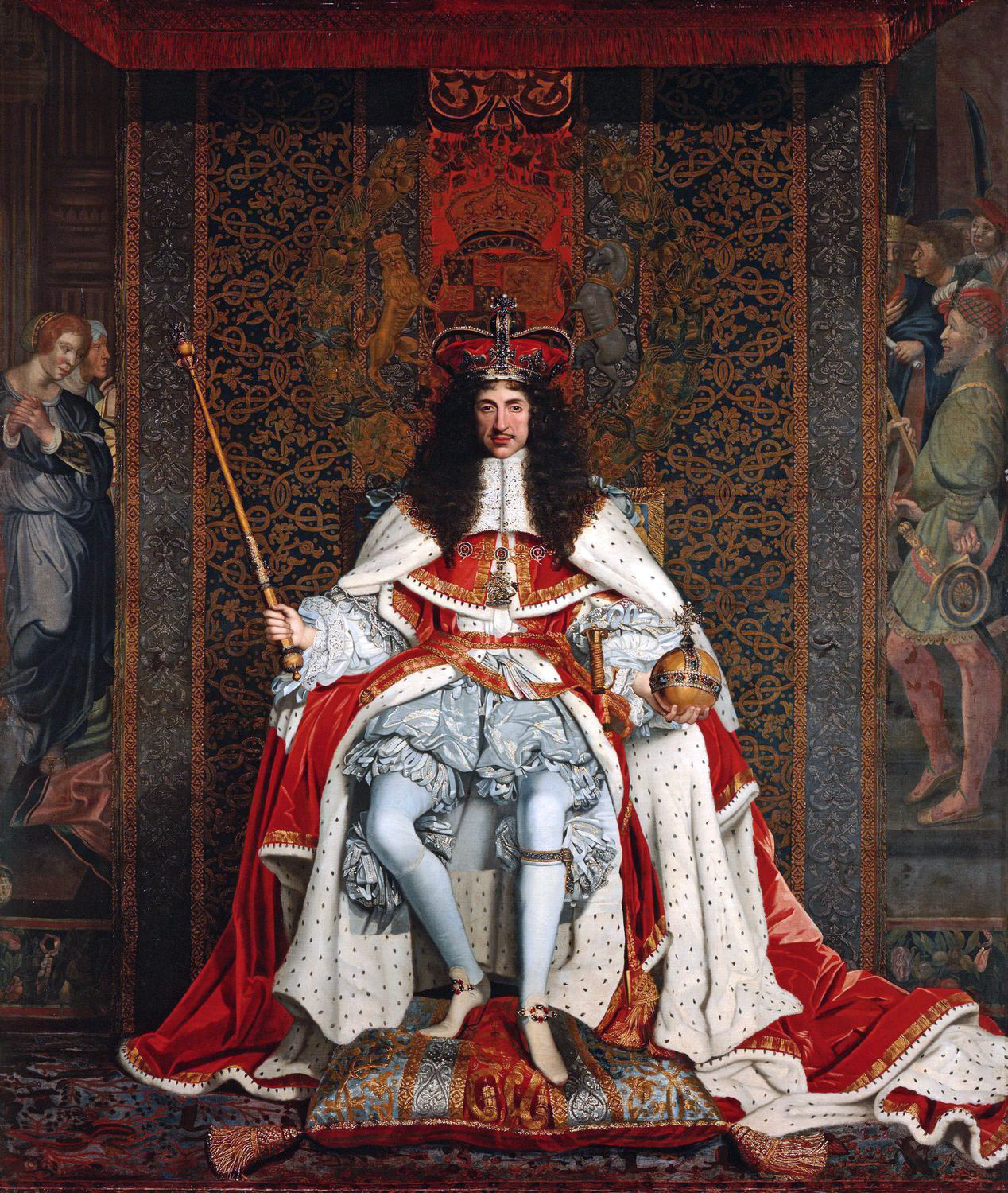
Charles II circa 1661

The Knights of the Royal Oak was an intended order of chivalry in England. It was proposed in 1660 at the time of the restoration of Charles II of England to be a reward for those Englishmen who had faithfully and actively supported Charles during his nine years of exile in continental Europe. Members of the order were to be called "Knights of the Royal Oak", and bestowed with a silver medal, on a ribbon, depicting the king in the Royal oak tree. This was in reference to the oak tree at Boscobel House, then called the "Oak of Boscobel", in which Charles II hid to escape the Roundheads after the Battle of Worcester in 1651. Men were selected from all the counties of England and Wales, with the number from each county being in proportion to the population. William Dugdale in 1681 noted 687 names, each with a valuation of their estate in pounds per year. The estates of 18 men were valued at more than £3,000 per year. The names of the recipients are also listed in the baronetages, published in five volumes, 1741. Henry Cromwell-Williams, a zealous royalist and first cousin once removed to Oliver Cromwell, was one of the men proposed to be one of these knights.

The order was never established, abandoned out of concerns at the time that it might perpetuate dissension and keep alive the differences between Parliament and the King, which were better left forgotten:

"...it being wisely judged," says Noble, in his 'Memoirs of the Cromwell family', "that the order was calculated only to keep awake animosities, which it was the part of wisdom to lull to sleep."

Instead of individual honours being made, 29 May, Charles' birthday, was set aside as Oak Apple Day (Restoration Day) to commemorate the Restoration. Celebration was made by the wearing of oak leaves in the hat; oak apples gilded, with a few leaves surrounding them, were sold in the streets of London. The statue of Charles I of England, at Charing Cross, was also decorated with branches of oak on this day. The day is still observed in parts of England today. The modern organisation styling itself "Knights of the Royal Oak Society" is not legally recognised as one of the chivalric orders of the United Kingdom.

== Knights of the Royal Oak, intended recipients ==
=== Bedfordshire ===
- Sir William Beecher £1,600
- William Boteler £1,000
- Sir George Blundell, 2nd Baronet £1,200
- Francis Crawley £1,000
- Sir John Duncombe £1,000
- Samuel Ironsides £600
- William Spencer £1,000
- Richard Taylor £1,000

=== Berkshire ===
- John Blagrave £2,000
- Hungerford Dunch £2,000
- John Elwayes £700
- Edmund Fettiplace £700
- John Freeman £800
- Richard Garrard £1,000
- Edward Keyte £1,000
- Sir St. John Moore £1,500
- Colonel Richard Nevil £1,500
- George Purefoy £3,000
- Sir Compton Reade, 1st Baronet £2000
- John Whitwicke £800

=== Buckinghamshire ===
- Thomas Abraham, of Wingrave £600
- Thomas Catesby £800
- – Claver, of Woovinge £600
- Captain Peter Dayrell £600
- Charles Dormer £3,000
- William Dormer £1,000
- Francis Ingoldsby £1,000
- – Wells, of Lillingston £600

=== Cambridgeshire ===
- Robert Balam of Beaufort Hall £600
- Sir Thomas Bennet Wisbech £2,000
- Thomas Chicheley £2,000
- William Colvile of Newton £1000
- Thomas Ducket £1,000
- Sir Thomas Leventhorpe, 4th Baronet £2,000
- Sir Thomas Marsh £1,500
- Captain John Millicent of Bergham £700
- Captain Thomas Storey £800
- Sir Thomas Willys, 1st Baronet £1,000

=== Cheshire ===
- Thomas Baskerville £1,000
- Thomas Cholmondeley £2,000
- John Crew £1,000
- Roger Grosvenor of Eaton £3,000
- Henry Harpur £600
- — Leigh of Lyme £4,000
- Sir Thomas Mainwaring, 1st Baronet £1,000
- James Poole £2,000
- Darcie Savage £1,000
- Edward Spencer £600
- Peter Wilbraham £1,000
- Roger Wilbraham £1,000
- Sir Thomas Wilbraham £3,000

=== Cornwall ===
- – Boscowen £4,000
- Francis Buller £3,000
- Piers Edgecumbe £2,000
- – Ellyott, of Port Eliot
- Colonel – Godolphin £1,000
- Charles Grylls £700
- – Hallett £800
- Samuel Pendarvis £1,500
- – Penrose £1,000
- James Praed £600
- Edmund Prideaux £900
- Charles Roscarrocke £800
- Oliver Sawle £1,000
- William Scawen £800
- Joseph Tredenham £900
- John Vivyan £1,000

=== Cumberland ===
- Francis Howard £1,500
- Colonel Lamplugh £1,000
- William Layton £1,000
- Christopher Musgrave £1,000
- Thomas Curwen £1,000
- William Penington £1,000
- Edward Stanley £600
- Wrightington Senhouse £600

=== Devon ===
- Sir Copplestone Bamfield of Poltimore £1,900
- Col. Arthur Bassett of Umberleigh £1,000
- Sir William Courtenay of Powderham £3,000
- Sir John Davie, 1st Baronet £2,000
- Sir John Drake, 1st Baronet £800
- Richard Duke of Otterton £1,000
- Francis Fulford of Fulford £1,000
- Col. John Giffard (1602–1665) of Brightley £1,000
- Arthur Northcott £800
- Sir John Northcott, Bt £1,500
- Sir Courtney Pole of Shute £1,000
- Sir John Rolle (d.1706) of Stevenstone £1,000
- John Tuckfield of Little Fulford £1,000
- — Willoughby £1,700

=== Dorset ===
- – Baskervile £1,000
- Col. Humphrey Bishop £800
- Capt. Henry Boteler £600
- Thomas Freake £4,000
- Col. Robert Lawrence £700
- Woolley Miller £1,000
- John Still £1,000
- Col. Strangwayes £5,000
- William Thomas £600
- John Tregonwell £1,100
- Sir John Turbervile £1,500

=== Durham ===
- Col. William Blakeston £600
- Anthony Byerley £600
- Samuel Davison £600
- Colonel Eden £1,000
- Marke Milbanke £2,000
- Ralph Millett £600
- John Tempest £1,000

=== Essex ===
- Sir William Ayloffe, 3rd Baronet £1,000
- Capt. Bramston £1,000
- — Clifton of Woodford £800
- Thomas Coates £1,000
- William Knight £1,000
- Thomas Lewther £1,000
- Capt. Charles Maynard £1,000
- Capt. Charles Mildmay £1,000
- Major Scott £1,000
- Henry Woolaston £1,000
- John Wrothe £1,500

=== Gloucestershire ===
- John Browneinge Esq. £1000
- Duncombe Colchester £800
- William Cooke £1,000
- John Delabere £1,000
- Benedict Hall of High Meadow £4,000
- Sir Humphrey Hanmore (qv Hanham) £1,000
- Sir Humphrey Hooke £1,500
- William Jones £800
- Thomas Lloyd £800
- Thomas Masters £1,000
- Thomas Morgan £800
- John Smythe £1,000
- Richard Stevens £800

=== Hampshire ===
- Sir Humphrey Bennet knt £1,000
- Major Edward Cooke £1,500
- Henry Cooke esq the younger £1,000
- Edward Knight esq of Chawton £1,000
- John Norton esq £1,000
- George Pitt esq of Strathfieldsay £4,000
- Sir Henry Titchborne of Titchbourne £1,000
- William Wall esq of Crundall £1,000
- William Walle esq of Leushott £1,000

=== Herefordshire ===
- John Barnibee of Boothall £1,000
- Humphrey Baskerville £1,000
- Roger Bodenham, £2,000
- Wallop Brobaston £1,200
- Fitzwilliam Coningsby of Hampton Court £2,000
- Humphrey Cornewall £6,000
- Sir Edward Hopton £2,500
- Henry Lingen £2,000
- Sir Thomas Tomkins £2,000
- Roger Vaughan £1,500
- Thomas Whitney £2,000
- Herbert Westfaling £800

=== Hertfordshire ===
- Edward Bashe £1,500
- Edmund Field £600
- John Gore £600
- Ralph Gore £600
- William Gore £800
- — Harrison of Balls £600
- John Jessen £600
- Thomas Keytley £800
- Capt. Thomas Morley £1,000
- Francis Shalcrosse £800
- Peter Soames £1,500
- Edward Watts £600
- Sir Henry Wrothe of Durante, in Enfield, Middlesex £2,000

=== Huntingdonshire ===
- – Apreece esq of Washingley £1,000
- Robert Apreece esq £1,500
- Richard Naylor esq £600
- Thomas Rous esq £800
- John Stone esq £1,000
- Major Lionel Walden esq £600
- Henry Cromwell-Williams esq of Bodsey £2,000

=== Kent ===
- Edward Badbye esq £1,000
- John Clinckerd esq £600
- William Delaune knt £2,500
- William Dyke esq £1,000
- Thomas Englishe esq £700
- Humphrey Hide, jun esq £600
- William Kenwricke esq £600
- Thomas Leigh knt £1,500
- Stephen Leonard esq £1,000
- Edward Roper esq £2,000
- William Roper esq £600
- Sir Richard Sands knt £1,000
- Roger Twisden esq £1,000

=== Lancashire ===
- Francis Anderton esq £1,000
- Col James Anderton £1,500
- Edmund Asheton esq £1,000
- Christopher Banister esq £1,000
- Richard Boteler esq £1,000
- — Ffarrington esq of Worden £1,000
- — Fleetwood esq of Penwortham £1,000
- Thomas Greenhalgh esq £1,000
- John Girlington esq £1,000
- Thomas Holt esq £1,000
- Robert Holte esq £1,000
- John Ingleton senior esq £1,000
- Colonel Kirby £1,500
- Henry Norris esq £1,200
- Roger Nowell esq £1,000
- Thomas Preston esq £2,000
- Thomas Stanley esq £1,000
- William Stanley esq £1,000
- Edward Tildesley esq £1,000
- – Walmesley of Dunkenhalgh esq £2,000

=== Leicestershire ===
- Major Brudnell £1,000
- Capt William Cole £600
- George Dashwood esq £1,000
- Sir George Faunt knt £2,000
- William Lawford esq £1,000
- Col Neville of Holt £2,000
- – Pochin esq of Barkby £1,000
- – Skevington esq of Skevington £1,000
- Sir Edward Smythe knt £800
- William Street esq £1,000
- – Terringham esq £1,000
- Richard Verney esq £1,000
- – Whaley esq of Norton £1,000

=== Lincolnshire ===
- William Blythe £1,000
- Sir John Browne knt £1,000
- William Broxholme esq £1,000
- Sir Robert Carr, 3rd Baronet of Sleford £4,000
- – Desyad esq of Harleston £1,000
- Charles Dymoke esq of Scrivelsby £1,000
- John Hanby esq £1,500
- Jervas Nevill esq £1,200
- Sir John Newton, 2nd Baronet of Hather £3,000
- John South esq £2,000
- Capt William Thorold £1,500
- William Welby esq £600

=== London and Middlesex ===
- Major Matthew Bayley £600
- Capt John Bagshawe £600
- Capt Hercules Baron £600
- Capt Richard Crane £600
- Robert Blore esq £1,000
- Capt Samuel Clarke £600
- Charles Cheney esq £4,000
- Capt Ralph Clarke £600
- Capt Francis Crane £1,000
- Col. William Carlos £800
- Charles Carryll esq £1,000
- Lt Cox £600
- Alderman Francis Dashwood £2,000
- Henry Englishe esq £2,000
- Col Sir Ralph Freeman knt £1,000
- Col Charles Gifford £600
- William Goldsborough esq £1,500
- Leonard Hamond esq £1,000
- Thomas Hughes esq £1,500
- Alderman Francis Knight £2,000
- Capt Valentine Knight £1,500
- Commissary General Sir Edward Knightley knt £5,000
- Frances Maunsell esq £600
- Alderman Lewis £2,000
- Capt Edward Maunsell £800
- Col Thomas Neville £1,500
- Sir Roger Norwich, 2nd Baronet £2,000
- Major Rob Peyton £1,000
- Major Christ Pickeringe £600
- Col Charles Progers £600
- Col James Progers £600
- Thomas Reynold esq £2,000
- Sir William Roberts, 1st Baronet of Willesden £1,000
- Colonel Sampson £600
- George Skipp esq £600
- Alderman Sterlinge £2,000
- Col Standish £600
- Robert Thomas esq £3,000
- Morrice Tresham esq £600
- George Tresham esq £600
- Edward Turner esq son of Baron Turner £600
- Col Arthur Trevor £1,000
- Thomas Tunman esq £1,000
- Sir Robert Viner knt £3,500
- Peter Vandeput £800
- Col Sir Thos Woodcocke knt £1,000
- Edmund Warcup esq £800
- Capt Joseph Ward £600
- Charles Whitlaker esq £1,000
- Capt Thomas Willowbie £600
- Sir Thomas Allen knt £2,000
- Sir Anthony Bateman knt £2,000
- Sir Thomas Bateman knt £2,000
- Sir William Bateman knt £2,000
- Alderman Sir Thomas Bloodworth knt £3,000
- Alderman Bonfoy £2,000
- George Cary esq £600
- Sir Richard Chiverton knt £3,000
- Edward Dutton esq £1,000
- Sir James Muddiford knt £1,500
- Edward Palmer esq £800
- Henry Progers esq £600
- Sir Wm Peake knt £1,000
- Thomas Padnall esq £1,000
- Ald Richard Shelbury £1,000
- Sir George Smyth knt £2,000
- Sir William Turner knt £2,000
- Ald Thorowgood £2,000
- Samuel Foote esq £1,500
- Alderman Clutterbucke £2,000
- Sir John Lawrence knt £2,000
- Sir John Fredericke knt £2,000
- Alderman Wade £2,000
- Ald Bathurst £2,000
- Sir Francis Compton knt £2,000
- Capt George Gage £600
- Col John Russell £1,000
- Col Thomas Baynton £600
- Sir Thomas Danyell knt £600
- M Gen Randall Elgerton £1,000
- Col Francis Lovelace £600
- Col Morgan £600
- Sir Gilbert Gerrard £600
- Major Henn afterwards Sir Henry Henn £600
- Capt Roger Gardiner £600
- Lieut Hambleton £600
- – Morgan esq £800
- George Tresham esq £600
- William Washborne esq £600
- Capt Philip Sherrard £600
- Cornet Stanley £1,000
- Hatton Compton esq £600
- Richard Mounteney esq £1,000
- Arthur Maunsell £600
- Thomas Hardinge esq £1,500
- Thomas Fisher esq £600
- Nicholas Kemishe esq £600
- Thomas Dacres esq of Cheshunt £1,000
- James Jobson esq £1,000
- John Cowell esq qy Sir John Coe knt one of the Masters in Ch of Depden Suffolk £600
- Henry Kersley esq £600
- Peter Vandeput esq £800
- Richard Raynsford esq a judge £600
- Edward Atkinson esq £1,000
- William Barker esq £1,200
- Thomas Elmes esq of Lilford co Northampton £1,500
- John Keelinge son of Justice Keelinge £600
- Wm Haselwood esq of Maidwell £3,000
- William Marshall esq £600
- Francis Roper esq £600
- Thomas Waller esq £1,000

=== Norfolk ===
- Christopher Bedingfeld esq of Wyghton £800
- Osburne Clarke esq £1,000
- John Coke esq £1,000
- Thomas Garrard esq £1,000
- John Hobart esq of Blickling and Intwood £1,000
- Christopher Jug esq £1,500
- John Kendall esq of Thetford £1,000
- Sir Thomas Meddowe knt of Yarmouth £2,000
- John Nabbes esq £2,000
- Richard Nixson esq £1,000
- Lawrence Oxborow esq of Hackbech Hall £800
- William Paston esq of Paston £800
- Sir Joseph Payne knt of Norwich £1,000
- Valentine Saunders esq £600
- Capt Henry Stewart £1,000
- John Tasburgh esq £600
- Sir Charles Waldegrave, 3rd Baronet £2,000
- Robert Wright esq £1,000
- Thomas Wright esq of Kilverston £1,000
- John Wyndham esq of Felbrigge £3,500

=== Northamptonshire ===
- John Adams esq £1,000
- – Arundel esq of Stoke £1,000
- George Clarke esq of Watford £3,000
- Edward Palmer esq £1,200
- Bryan Johnson esq £1,000
- Walter Kirkham esq of Fineshade Abbey £800
- Francis Lane esq £600
- Thomas Morgan esq £600
- Tanfield Moulso esq of Thingdon £600
- Humphrey Orme esq of Peterboro £1,000
- – Ouley esq of Catesby £1,000
- William Stafford esq of Blatherwick £3,000
- William Tate esq of Delapre £1,500
- Francis Thursby esq of Abington £1,000
- John Willoughby esq £600

=== Northumberland ===
- Thomas Beewicke esq £2,000
- Daniel Collingwood esq £600
- George Collingwood esq £800
- Sir William Foster knt £1,000
- Sir Thomas Horseley knt £1,000
- Charles Howard esq £600
- Robert Shafto esq £1,000
- – Thometon esq of Netherwhitton £800

=== Nottinghamshire ===
- Cecil Cooper esq of Thurgarton £1,000
- Sir John Curzon, 1st Baronet £500
- – Eyre esq of Mansfield Woodhouse £2,000
- – Middleton esq £1,000
- John Palmer esq £600
- – Whaley esq £1,200

=== Oxfordshire ===
- Sir John Clarke £2,000
- Sir Anthony Cope, 4th Baronet £4,000
- – Gardiner esq of Tew £800
- James Herne esq £1,000
- Sir Henry Jones knt £1,500
- Sir Francis Henry Lee, 4th Baronet £3,000
- Rowland Lucey esq £1,600
- Sir Francis Norris £1,500
- Sir Thomas Penyston, 2nd Baronet £800
- Matthew Skinner esq £600
- Welsborne Sill esq £600
- Thomas Stoner esq £3,000
- Sir Timothy Tynell £1,500
- Cuthbert Warcupp esq £1,000
- Sir Francis Wenman knt £1,500
- George Wenman esq £2,000

=== Rutland ===
- Abel Barker esq 1000
- Christopher Browne esq 600
- Samuel Browne esq 600
- Edward Fawkenor esq of Uppingham 1600
- Richard Halford esq of Ediweston 600
- Henry Noel esq 1000

=== Shropshire ===
- Francis Charleton esq £2,000
- Thomas Cornwall esq £500
- Henry Davenport esq £800
- Andrew Forrester esq £1,000
- Richard Fowler esq £1,000
- John Kynnaston esq £1,000
- Robert Leighton esq £800
- Charles Mainwaringe esq £600
- Andrew Newport esq £800
- William Oakeley esq £800
- Col William Owen £800
- Thomas Talbott esq £1,000
- George Weld esq £1,000
- Thomas Whitmore esq £600
- Sir John Wylde knt £1,000

=== Somerset ===
- Warwick Bamfield esq £1,000
- Sir William Basselt of Claverton £1,800
- Edward Berkley esq £1,000
- Samuel Gorges esq £600
- John Hall esq £900
- John Carey esq £1,500
- John Hunt esq £1,500
- – Lacey esq of Hartley £1,000
- Francis Luttrell esq £1,500
- Sir George Norton knt £1,800
- Peregrine Palmer esq £1,500
- John Pawlet esq £1,000
- Edward Phelips esq £1,500
- George Stawell esq £5,000
- John Tint esq £1,000

=== Staffordshire ===
- Capt Francis Biddulph £600
- Richard Congreve esq £600
- Johnathan Cope esq £800
- Charles Cotton esq £600
- Walter Fowler esq £1,500
- Walter Gifford esq £1,500
- Henry Grey esq of Envile £1,000
- Colonel Lane £700
- Francis Leveson esq £2,000
- Robert Leveson esq £600
- Richard Oakover esq £1,000
- Edwin Scrumshire esq £1,000
- Thomas Whitgrave esq £600

=== Suffolk ===
- William Barker esq £600
- Capt Bennett £1,000
- William Blomfield esq £600
- Joseph Brand esq of Edwardston £1,000
- John Brookes esq £1,000
- Richard Cooke esq £1,000
- Robert Crane esq £1,500
- John Gibbes esq £800
- Clement Higham esq £1,000
- Roger Kedington esq £800
- Sir Edmund Poley knt £1,000
- Edmond Sheppard esq £1,000
- Charles Stutteville esq of Dalham £1,500
- Robert Style esq £600
- John Warner esq £1,000
- Henry Warner esq £1,000
- Randall Williams esq £600

=== Surrey ===
- Capt Bartholomew £600
- Richard Berry esq £1,000
- Charles Bickerstaffe esq £600
- Thomas Brand esq £700
- Edward Bromfeild esq £1,000
- Sir Adam Browne, 2nd Baronet £1,600
- George Browne esq £600
- Capt Roger Clarke £600
- John Dawes esq £700
- Thomas Delmahoy esq £1,200
- George Duke esq £600
- Roger Duncombe esq £1,000
- Giles Dunster esq £600
- Edward Evelyn esq of Ditton £600
- Sir John Evelyn, 1st Baronet, of Godstone £1,800
- Charles Good esq £700
- James Gresham esq £800
- Capt John Holmendon £600
- Edward Moore esq £600
- William Muschamp esq of Roebarnes £600
- Roger Pettyward (Pettiward) esq of Putney, Surrey, £2,000
- Peter Quinnall esq £600
- Vincent Randall esq £1,000
- Geo Smyth esq £600
- White Titchbourne esq £1,000
- — Thomas esq of Cobham £600
- George Turner esq £1,000
- Geo Vernon esq of Farnham £800
- Geo Woodroffe esq of Poyle £1,500
- Edward Woodward esq £1,000
- Davis Wymondswold esq of Putney £2,000
- James Zouch esq £2,000

=== Warwickshire ===
- John Bridgman esq £1,000
- Thomas Broughton esq of Lawford £800
- William Combes esq £800
- William Dylke esq of Maxstoke Castle £800
- Thomas Flint esq £700
- — Jenings esq of Bromesbam £1,000
- — Keyte esq of Camden £1,000
- — Middlemore esq of Edgebaston £2,000
- Edward Peyton esq £1,800
- Capt Geo Rawley £700
- Seabright Reppington esq £1,000
- — Sheldon esq of Beoley £2,000
- John Stratford esq £1,000
- Richard Verney esq of Compton £600
- William Wood esq £800

=== Westmorland ===
- Allan Bellingham esq £1,500
- Richard Braythwaite esq £600
- Sir Thomas Braythwaite knt £1,500
- Thomas Cabetas esq £600
- Christ Crackenthorpe esq £600
- John Dalston esq £600
- James Duckett esq £800
- Daniel Fleminge esq £1,800
- Thomas Leybourne esq £600
- John Lowther esq £4,000
- John Otway esq £600

=== Wiltshire ===
- Thomas Baskervile esq £1,200
- William Boddenham esq £600
- George Bond esq £800
- Walter Buckland esq £900
- John Bowles esq £600
- William Duckett esq £1,000
- Sir John Ernley knt £1,000
- John Gore esq £600
- John Holte esq £800
- Richard Grubham Howe esq £1,200
- Edward Hyde esq £600
- Oliver Nicholas esq £1,000
- John Norden esq £800
- Sir John Scroope knt £700
- William Willoughby esq £600

=== Worcestershire ===
- William Acton esq £1,000
- Sir Rowland Berkeley knt £1,000
- Philip Brace esq £600
- Henry Bromley £1,000
- Thomas Child esq £2,000
- Sir Henry Lyttelton, 2nd Baronet of Frankley £3,000
- Matthew Morphew esq £1,000
- Sir William Russell, 1st Baronet, of Wytley £2,000
- Samuel Sandys esq of Umbersley £1,000
- Thomas Savage esq of Elmley Castle £800
- – Sheldon esq of Broadway £600
- Francis Sheldon esq £600
- Sherrington Talbott esq £1,000
- Joseph Walsh esq £1,000
- Major Thomas Weld £600
- Sir John Woodford knt £2,000

=== Yorkshire ===
- Francis Bayldon esq £600
- John Beilby esq £1,000
- Major John Beverley £600
- Barrington Bourchier esq £1,000
- John Calverley esq of Calverley £1,000
- Walter Calverley esq £1,000
- Nicholas Chaloner esq £600
- Marmaduke Constable esq £1,000
- Thomas Danby esq £3,000
- Robert Doldon esq £600
- Capt John Garnett £600
- Richard Hutton esq £1,000
- James Moyser esq £1,000
- William Osbaldiston esq £1,000
- – Pennyman esq £1,000
- Thomas Tancred esq £800
- Edward Trotter esq £1,000
- Major Vavasor of Weston £600
- Sir Walter Vavasor knt £1,000
- Sir Christ Wandesford knt £2,000

=== Wales ===
Anglesey

- – Bodden, Esq. £1,000
- William Bould, Esq. £1,000
- Pierce Lloyd, Esq. £1,000
- John Robinson, Esq. £800
- Thomas Wood, Esq. £600

Brecknockshire

- Richard Gwynn, Esq. £600
- John Jefferys, Esq. £600
- Walter Vaughan, Esq. £700
- Wilbourne Williams, Esq. £600

Cardiganshire

- John Jones, Esq. £800
- Thomas Jones, Esq. £600
- Reynold Jenkins, Esq. £700
- James Lewis £700
- Edward Vaughan, Esq. £1,000

Carmarthenshire

- Altham (John?) Vaughan, Esq. £1,000
- Philip Vaughan, Esq. £600
- Henry Maunsell, Esq. £700
- Rowland Gwynn, Esq. £899
- Charles Vaughan, Esq. £600
- William Gwynn, Esq. £700
- Nicholas Williams, Esq. £1,000
- Richard Gwynn, Esq. £700

Caernarvonshire

- Sir John Owen's heir £1,500

Denbighshire

- Charles Salisburie, Esq. £1,300
- Huscall Thelwall, Esq. £600
- Foulke Middleton, Esq. £600
- John Wynn, Esq. £600
- Sir Thomas Middleton, Knt. (of Chirk Castle, Wrexham) £600
- Bevis Lloyd, Esq. £600
- John Lloyd, Esq. £600

Flintshire

- Sir Roger Mostyn, 1st Baronet, of Mostyn £4,000
- Sir Edward Mostyn, Knt £1,500
- – Salisbury, of Hegragge, Esq. £600
- Robert Davies, Esq. £2,000
- John Puliston, Esq. £2,500
- Sir Thomas Hanmer, 2nd Baronet £3,000
- William Hanmer, Esq.

Glamorganshire

- Sir – Esterlinge, Knt. £2,000
- Herbert Evans, Esq. £1,500
- David Jenkins, Esq. £1,500
- Thomas Mathews, Esq. £1,100
- William Bassett, Esq. £800
- William Herbert, Esq. £1,000
- Edmund Lewis, Esq. £800
- David Mathews, Esq. £1,000

Merionethshire

- – Attwyll, of Parke, Esq. £1,500
- Lewis Owen, Esq. £600
- John Lloyd, Esq. £600
- William Vaughan, Esq. £1,200
- William Salesbury, Esq. £800
- William Price, Esq. £1,500
- Howell Vaughan, Esq. £800

Monmouthshire

- William Morgan, Esq. £4,000
- William Jones, of Lanarthe, Esq. £1,000
- Thomas Lewis, Esq. £1,000
- Charles Vann, Esq. £800
- Walter Rumsey, Esq. £600
- William Jones, of Llantrischent, Esq. £600
- – Milbourne, Esq. £800

Montgomeryshire

- John Pugh, Esq. £1,000
- – Owen, Esq., of Ruserton £1,000
- – Blaney, Esq. £1,000
- Roger Lloyd, Esq. £800
- Richard Owen, Esq. £800
- Richard Herbert, Esq. £700
- Sir Edward Lloyd £1,200
- Edmund Waring, Esq. £700

Pembrokeshire

- Thomas Langhorne, Esq. £800
- Lewis Wogan, Esq. £1,000
- Hugh Bowen, Esq. £600
- Essex Merricke, Esq. £600
- Sir John Lort, Knt. (Bart. after) £2,000

Radnorshire

- George Gwynne £1,500
- Evan Davies £600
- – Price, Esq. £1,000

== See also ==
- Escape of Charles II
- Oak apple
- Royal Oak (tree)
