= Edward Hyde (priest) =

English royalist cleric (1607–1659)

Edward Hyde (1607–1659) was an English royalist cleric, nominally Dean of Windsor at the end of his life.

== Life ==
One of the twelve sons of Sir Lawrence Hyde of Salisbury, he was educated at Westminster School, and then elected in 1625 to Trinity College, Cambridge. He became fellow of his college, was appointed tutor 1636, and proceeded M.A. 1637. He was created D.D. of Oxford University in January 1642–3.

Hyde was presented to the rectory of Brightwell-cum-Sotwell, in Berkshire, but after 1645 the living was sequestered from him for "scandal in life and disaffection to the Parliament". By an order of the parliamentary committee, dated 8 March 1649, he was granted a fifth of the annual value of the living for the support of his family, but his successor, John Ley, succeeded in obtaining a dispensation from this payment in 1652, on the ground that Hyde was possessed of lands and woods in Wiltshire, and that his wife's father was wealthy. The matter was publicised by John Ley in An Acquittance or Discharge from Dr. E. H. his Demand of a Fifth Part of the Rectory of Br. in Barks, 1654, which included An Apologie against the Doctors Defamations … at Oxford and elsewhere, and A Preparative to further Contestation about other Differences. It was followed in 1655 by General Reasons … against the Defalcation of a Fifth Part of the Minister's Maintenance, … whereto are added particular Reasons against the Payment … to Dr. E. H. … Together with an Answer to a Letter of the said Dr. E. H., occasioned by the late Insurrection at Salisbury. A version of the "further Contestation" is thought to be referenced in A Debate concerning the English Liturgy … drawn out in two English and two Latine Epistles written betwixt Edward Hyde, D.D., and John Ley, published by Ley in 1656.

Hyde retired from Brightwell to Oxford, and resided in the precincts of Hart Hall. He studied in the Bodleian Library, and preached in Holywell church in the suburbs till silenced by adverse opinion. In 1658 he obtained through the influence of his exiled kinsman Edward Hyde, letters patent for the deanery of Windsor, but died 16 August 1659 at Salisbury. He was buried in Salisbury Cathedral.

== Works ==
Hyde was the author of:

- A Wonder and yet no Wonder: a great Red Dragon in Heaven, London, 1651.
- The Mystery of Christ in us, London, 1651. This consists of six sermons on various topics.
- A Christian Legacy, consisting of two parts: i. A Preparation for Death, ii. A Consolation against Death, Oxford, 1657.
- Christ and his Church, or Christianity explained, under seven Evangelical and Ecclesiastical Heads, &c. With a Justification of the Church of England, London, 1658.
- A Christian Vindication of Truth against Errour, concerning these Seven Controversies, London, 1659. The book is against "G.B.", who had written on the Roman Catholic side against the English church.

After Hyde's death, Richard Boreman edited two works left in manuscript:

- The True Catholick's Tenure, or a good Christian's Certainty, which he ought to have of his Religion, and may have of his Salvation, Cambridge, 1662.
- Allegiance and Conscience not fled out of England, or the Doctrine of the Church of England concerning Allegiance and Supremacy: as it was delivered by the former Author upon the occasion and at the time of trying the King by his own Subjects; in several Sermons, anno 1649, Cambridge, 1662.

A Latin poem by Hyde is prefixed to James Duport's translation of The Book of Job into Greek verse (1637), and he contributed to the Cambridge Poems some verses in celebration of the birth of the Princess Elizabeth (1635).

== Notes ==
Attribution

This article incorporates text from a publication now in the public domain: Lee, Sidney, ed. (1891). "Hyde, Edward (1607-1659)". Dictionary of National Biography. Vol. 28. London: Smith, Elder & Co.
