= Henry Hyde (Royalist) =

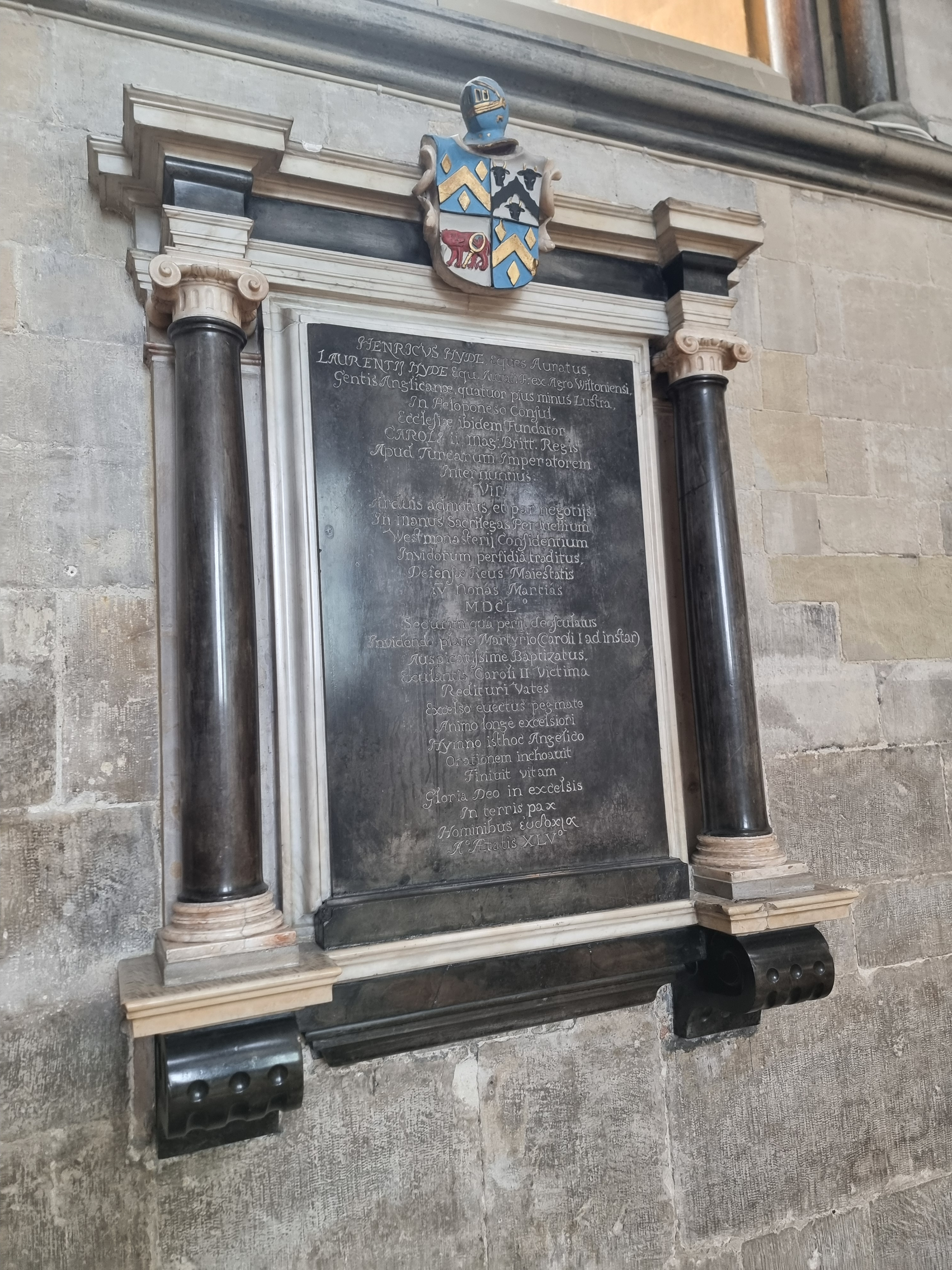
Memorial to Henry Hyde in Salisbury Cathedral

Sir Henry Hyde (c.1605–1650) was a Royalist diplomat beheaded by the Parliamentarians, for acting as an envoy for the soon-to-be exiled King, Charles II of England.

His father Lawrence Hyde (1562-1641) of Salisbury, Wiltshire, was the attorney-general to Anne of Denmark and a Member of Parliament (MP).

Henry became a merchant and consul, based for many years in Turkey. During the Interregnum, he was selected by Charles II (who would flee into exile in 1651), to act as an envoy to the Turkish empire and solicit their support for his cause.

The official Parliamentarian (Roundhead) ambassador, Sir Thomas Bendish, strongly objected to his presence in Constantinople and prevailed upon the Turks to arrest him and ship him back to England.

Sir Henry Hyde was imprisoned in the Tower, charged with treason, and tried by a court made up from the House of Commons. The court found him guilty and sentenced him to death. He was beheaded, after kissing the executioner's axe, outside the Old Exchange in Cornhill, London, on 4 March 1650. His remains were interred in Salisbury Cathedral where his epitaph is inscribed on a marble tablet.
