= Lawrence Hyde (attorney-general) =

English lawyer and attorney-general

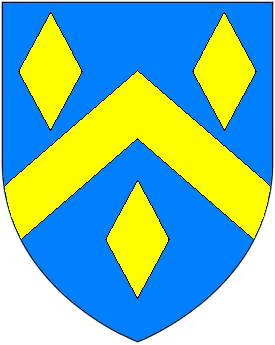
Arms of Hyde: Azure, a chevron between three lozenges or

Sir Lawrence Hyde II (1562 – 26 January 1641) was an English lawyer who was Attorney-general to the consort of King James I, Anne of Denmark. He sat in the House of Commons at various times between the years 1584 and 1611.

== Origins ==
Hyde was the second son of Lawrence Hyde I (d. 1590) of West Hatch, Wiltshire, MP for Heytesbury in 1584, by his second wife Anne Sibell, daughter of Nicholas Sibell of Farningham, Kent, and widow of Matthew Colthurst of Claverton, Somerset. He was the brother of Henry Hyde (c. 1563–1634), MP, and Sir Nicholas Hyde (c. 1572–1631), Lord Chief Justice.

== Career ==
He matriculated at Magdalen Hall, Oxford in around 1579, aged 17 and was awarded BA on 9 March 1580. He was elected Member of Parliament for Chippenham in 1586. He lived at Heale House, Middle Woodford, near Salisbury and was called to the bar at Middle Temple in 1589.

Hyde was elected MP for Heytesbury in 1597 and for Marlborough in 1601 and 1604. In July 1614, he became Attorney-general to Anne of Denmark, consort of King James I, succeeding Robert Hitcham who was appointed Sergeant-at-Law. He was knighted on 27 November 1614. In 1616 he became treasurer of the Middle Temple.

== Marriage and children ==
Hyde married Barbara Castillion or Castiglioni, daughter of the Italian tutor of Queen Elizabeth I, Gian-Baptista de Candia Castiglioni, in English John Castillion, of Benham, Berkshire, by whom he had 12 sons and 5 daughters. Five of his sons rose to significant positions:

- Sir Henry Hyde (c. 1605–1650). An ardent royalist who accompanied Charles II to the Continent, and returning to England was beheaded in 1650.
- Sir Robert Hyde (1595–1665). Chief Justice of the King's Bench
- Alexander Hyde (1598–1667). Bishop of Salisbury
- Edward Hyde (1607–1659). A royalist divine who was nominated Dean of Windsor in 1658, but died before taking up the appointment, and who was the author of many controversial works in Anglican theology.
- Lawrence Hyde (c.1610–1682). Member of Parliament for Winchester
