= Bletso =

Bletso may refer to:

- Andrew St John, 21st Baron St John of Bletso (1918–1978), English peer
- Anthony St John, 22nd Baron St John of Bletso (born 1957), British peer, businessman and solicitor
- Baron Beauchamp of Bletso, title in the Peerage of England
- Baron St John of Bletso, in the County of Bedford, is a title in the Peerage of England
- Beauchamp St John, 17th Baron St John of Bletso (1844–1912), English peer
- Henry St John, 18th Baron St John of Bletso DL (1876–1920), English peer
- John St John, 11th Baron St John of Bletso (died 1757), British peer
- John St John, 20th Baron St John of Bletso (1917–1976), English peer
- John St John, 2nd Baron St John of Bletso (died 1596), English peer
- Margaret Beauchamp of Bletso (1405–1482), the daughter of John, Baron Beauchamp of Bletso
- Mowbray St John, 19th Baron St John of Bletso (1877–1934), English peer
- Oliver St John, 1st Baron St John of Bletso (died 1582), English peer
- Oliver St John, 5th Baron St John of Bletso (1603–1642), English politician and Parliamentarian Army officer
- St Andrew St John, 14th Baron St John of Bletso (1759–1817), member of the British House of Commons
- St Andrew St John, 15th Baron St John of Bletso (1811–1874), English peer
- St Andrew St John, 16th Baron St John of Bletso (1840–1887), English peer
