= St Andrew St John =

St Andrew St John may refer to:

- St Andrew St John, 14th Baron St John of Bletso (1759–1817), English politician
- St Andrew St John, 15th Baron St John of Bletso (1811–1874), English peer
- St Andrew St John, 16th Baron St John of Bletso (1840–1887), English peer
- St Andrew St John (priest) (1732–1795), Dean of Worcester

== See also ==
- Andrew St. John
