= Arthur Lawson Johnston, 3rd Baron Luke =

British peer (1933–2015)

The Right Honourable The Lord Luke KStJ

Member of the House of Lords
- Lord Temporal
- Hereditary peer 8 July 1996 – 11 November 1999
- Preceded by: The 2nd Baron Luke
- Succeeded by: Seat abolished
- Elected Hereditary Peer; 11 November 1999 – 24 June 2015
- Election: 1999
- Preceded by: Seat established
- Succeeded by: The 9th Duke of Wellington

Personal details
- Born: 13 January 1933
- Died: 2 October 2015 (aged 82)

Arthur Charles St John Lawson Johnston, 3rd Baron Luke KStJ (13 January 1933 – 2 October 2015) was a British peer. He was one of the ninety hereditary peers elected to remain in the House of Lords after the passing of the House of Lords Act 1999 until his retirement in 2015.

The son of the 2nd Baron Luke and Barbara Lloyd-Anstruther, he was educated at Eton College in Berkshire and Trinity College, Cambridge, where he graduated with a Bachelor of Arts in history in 1957. In 1996, he succeeded to his father's title. Johnston worked for the family firm Bovril Ltd from 1955 to 1971, served on Bedfordshire County Council from 1965 to 1970, and was a fine art dealer in watercolours of the 18th, 19th and 20th centuries. Between 1962 and 1978, he was president of the National Association of Warehouse-keepers, and between 1983 and 1990, Commander of the St John Ambulance Brigade. He was appointed High Sheriff of Bedfordshire in 1969.

He was also a member of the Court of the Corporation of the Sons of the Clergy, of the Game Conservancy Association and of the Countryside Alliance. He was a Knight of the Venerable Order of Saint John and a Freeman of the City of London. In 2001–02, he was Master of the Drapers Company, having been a Member of Court since 1993.

He entered the House of Lords in 1996 and following the Conservative party's defeat in the 1997 general election he became an Opposition Whip in the House of Lords. Lord Luke was Opposition Spokesperson for Wales (2000–06), Transport (2002–04), Defence (2004–10) and Tourism (2010). He retired from the House on 24 June 2015.

Lord Luke married firstly Silvia Maria Roigt in 1959. They divorced in 1971, and he married secondly Sarah Louise Hearne, daughter of the actor Richard Hearne in 1971. He had one son, Ian James Lawson Johnston, 4th Baron Luke, and two daughters by his first wife, and one son by his second wife.

He died on 2 October 2015 at the age of 82, just over three months after his retirement from the Lords.

== Arms ==
Coat of arms of Arthur Lawson Johnston, 3rd Baron Luke
Crest A spur between two wings Or. Escutcheon Argent on a saltire Sable between four daggers points downwards Gules the sun in his splendour Or on a chief of the third three cushions of the fourth. Supporters Dexter a heron sinister a flamingo both Proper. Motto Nunquam Non Paratus (Never Unprepared)

Peerage of the United Kingdom
Preceded by Ian Lawson Johnston	Baron Luke; 1996–2015; Member of the House of Lords (1996–1999)	Succeeded by Ian James Lawson Johnston
Parliament of the United Kingdom
New office created by the House of Lords Act 1999	Elected hereditary peer to the House of Lords under the House of Lords Act 1999; 1999–2015	Succeeded by The Duke of Wellington
