= Ian Lawson Johnston, 2nd Baron Luke =

British Peer, businessman & philanthropist (1905-1996)

Ian St John Lawson Johnston, 2nd Baron Luke, KCVO, TD, DL, JP, (7 June 1905 – 25 May 1996) was a British Peer, businessman and philanthropist.

== Early life and education ==
Johnston was the eldest son of George Lawson Johnston, 1st Baron Luke and his wife Edith Laura St John. He was educated at Eton, and Trinity College, Cambridge and travelled in Australia and South America studying the beef industry.

== Career ==
He followed his father in business, being Chairman of Bovril Ltd and the Argentine Estates of Bovril, Virol Ltd and Electrolux Ltd. He was also a Director of Ashanti Goldfields Corporation Ltd, Lloyds Bank Ltd, National Provincial Institution, Australian Mercantile Land and Finance Co Ltd and other Companies. During his time as director and chairman, Bovril expanded successfully and took over Marmite. After Luke's retirement, the company was sold to Cavenham, owned by James Goldsmith. Lord Luke was President of the London Chamber of Commerce from 1952 to 1955, and president of the Advertising Association from 1955 to 1958.

During World War II, Johnston served as Lieutenant Colonel of the Bedfordshire and Hertfordshire Regiment. On the death of his father in 1943, he became 2nd Lord Luke. He was Chairman of Bedfordshire TAA in 1943, on the Duke of Gloucester's Red Cross and St John's Fund from 1943 to 1946 and on the London Hospitals Central Committee from 1943 to 1945. From 1949 to 1952, Lord Luke served as the first president of the National Association of Leagues of Hospital Friends (renamed Attend since 2006), supporting volunteers in health and social care. From 1947 to 1952 he was a member of the Advisory Council of the BBC, and from 1947 to 1956 on the Moorfields Westminster and Central Eye Hospital Committee. He became a member of the Church Assembly (House of Laity) in 1935 and was Chairman of the governors of Queen Mary College, University of London from 1963 to 1982 becoming a Fellow in 1980.

He was active in local affairs becoming DL in 1938, and JP in 1939, on Bedfordshire County Council from 1943 to 1952, Chairman of the Standing Joint Committee for Bedfordshire as well as High Sheriff. He was appointed KCVO in 1976.

He was interested in all forms of sport apart from being Master of the Oakley Hunt. He was Chairman of the Area Committee for National Fitness, Hertfordshire and Bedfordshire from 1937 to 1939 and later Chairman of the National Playing Fields Association. In 1951 he joined the International Olympic Committee, and remained until 1988, being instrumental in bringing the Games up to date, without sacrificing the event's underlying spirit. He was the President of the Lord's Taverners in 1969.

He was the first President of the charity Attend (then the National Association of Leagues of Hospital Friends) and was very influential in helping develop Attend in its early beginnings. He was the President of the organisation from 1949 to 1952.

== Personal life ==
In 1932 he married Barbara Anstruther-Gough-Calthorpe, younger daughter of Sir FitzRoy Hamilton Anstruther-Gough-Calthorpe and had four sons and a daughter.

== Arms ==
Coat of arms of Ian Lawson Johnston, 2nd Baron Luke
Crest A spur between two wings Or. Escutcheon Argent on a saltire Sable between four daggers points downwards Gules the sun in his splendour Or on a chief of the third three cushions of the fourth. Supporters Dexter a heron sinister a flamingo both Proper. Motto Nunquam Non Paratus (Never Unprepared)

Peerage of England
Preceded by George Lawson Johnston	Baron Luke; 1943–1996	Succeeded by Arthur Lawson Johnston
