= White Ladye =

Steam yacht built in 1891

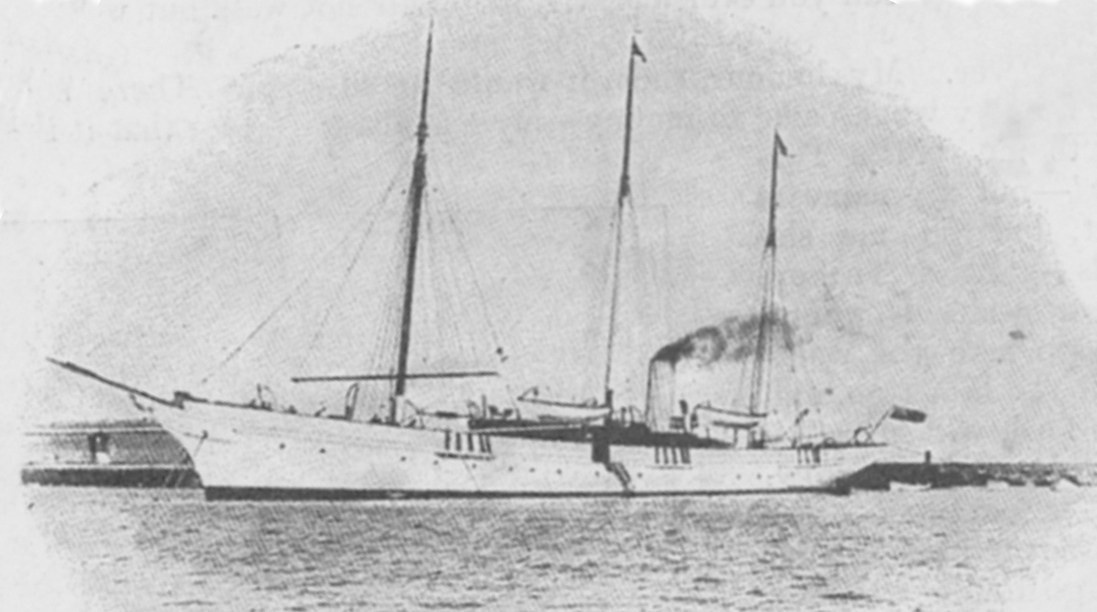
- The yacht as White Ladye

History
- Name: 1891: Ladye Mabel; 1893: White Ladye; 1918: La Champagne
- Namesake: 1891: Mabel Edith Baring
- Owner: 1891: Frances Baring; 1893: Lillie Langtry; 1900: John Johnston; 1902: William Gray; 1918: Jérome Malandain
- Operator: 1893: Ogden Goelet
- Port of registry: 1891: (United Kingdom) Cowes; 1918: (France) Fécamp
- Builder: Ramage & Ferguson, Leith
- Cost: £40,000
- Yard number: 102
- Launched: 12 January 1891
- Identification: UK official number 98472; 1892: code letters MCGW; 1919: code letters JVLW; 1921: code letters OKXZ; 1934: call sign FONA
- Fate: Scrapped, 1935

General characteristics
- Type: steam yacht
- Tonnage: 569 GRT, 312 NRT
- Length: 220.0 ft (67.1 m) overall; 204.0 ft (62.2 m) registered
- Beam: 27.15 ft (8.28 m)
- Depth: 16.45 ft (5.01 m)
- Decks: 2
- Installed power: 143 NHP
- Propulsion: 1 × triple-expansion engine; 1 × screw
- Sail plan: three-masted schooner
- Speed: 13 knots (24 km/h)
- Crew: 31

White Ladye was a steel-hulled steam yacht. She was launched in Scotland in 1891 as Ladye Mabel, and renamed White Ladye by 1893. By 1919 she had been converted into a steam fishing trawler, and renamed La Champagne. She was built for Francis Baring, 5th Baron Ashburton. By 1893 she belonged to the actress Lillie Langtry. From 1893 the US businessman Ogden Goelet regularly chartered her. By 1900 John Lawson Johnston, the creator of Bovril, owned her. By 1902 William Cresswell Gray, of shipbuilders William Gray & Company, owned her. By 1919 Jérome Malandain of Fécamp owned her, and was using her as a trawler. She was laid up from 1926, and scrapped in Belgium in 1935.

== Ladye Mabel ==
WC Storey designed the yacht for Lord Ashburton. Ramage & Ferguson of Leith built her as yard number 102, and launched her on 12 January 1891. Her lengths were 220.0 ft (67.1 m) overall, and 204.0 ft (62.2 m) registered. Her beam was 27.15 ft (8.28 m), and her depth was 16.45 ft (5.01 m). Her tonnages were 569 GRT, 312 NRT, and 693 tons Thames Measurement. She had a single screw, driven by a three-cylinder triple-expansion engine that was rated at 143 NHP and gave her a speed of 13 knots (24 km/h). In 1893 it was reported that her bunkers had capacity for 180 tons of coal; that at 11 knots (20 km/h) she consumed 12 tons per day; and in favourable conditions she could cross the North Atlantic in 13 days. However, in 1897 it was reported that she had capacity for 130 tons of coal. She had three masts, and was rigged as a schooner. She cost £40,000. Lord Ashburton named her after his first wife. The yacht was registered in Cowes on the Isle of Wight. Her United Kingdom official number was 98472, and by 1892 her code letters were MCGW.

== White Ladye ==
=== With Lillie Langtry and Ogden Goelet ===
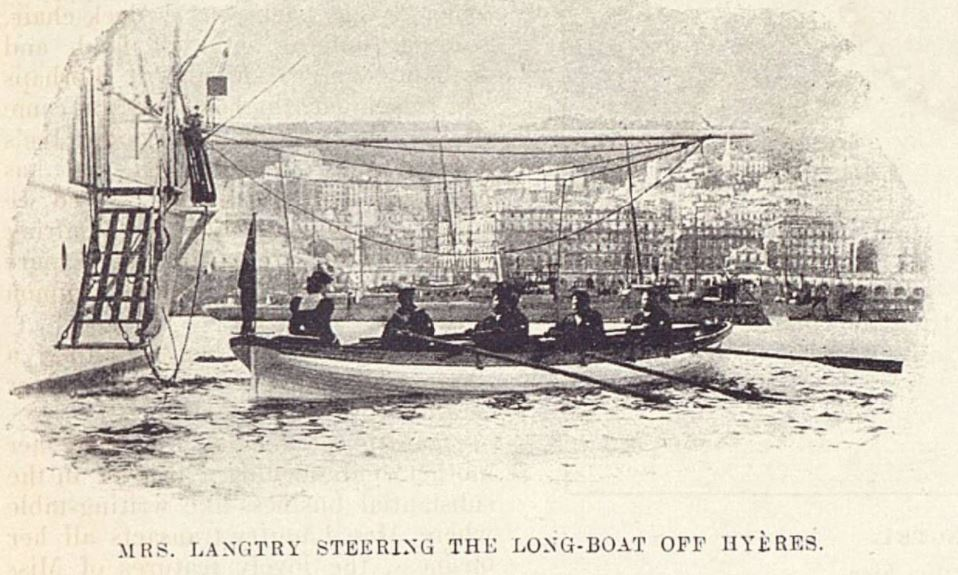
Lillie Langtry steering one of White Ladye's rowing boats at Hyères in the south of France

By 1893 Lillie Langtry had acquired the yacht, and had renamed her White Ladye. In January 1893 the yacht left Cowes for the south of France, and Langtry followed by train some weeks later. The yacht met bad weather en route, and needed repairs to her living quarters when she reached Marseille. Langtry cruised the Mediterranean aboard her, until she received news of the death in New Orleans of her lover George Alexander Baird on 18 March 1893. She immediately made for Nice, whence she returned by train to London. Her yacht returned to Cowes that April.

Goelet was a member of the New York Yacht Club. He chartered White Ladye from Langtry each season for £1,000 a month from 1893 until his death in 1897. He used the yacht in his social life in the United States, Britain and the south of France, and to attend international yacht racing regattas. On occasion, White Ladye towed premier racing yachts to events, including the Prince of Wales' HMY Britannia and Sir Andrew Walker's Ailsa. Goelet was friends with the Prince of Wales, whom he entertained aboard White Ladye, meeting Queen Victoria once in Nice when their yachts were moored alongside each other. In 1897 Goelet took delivery at Cowes of a larger and more powerful new yacht, Mayflower, which had been built for him in Clydebank, Scotland. Goelet became ill and died soon after.

In November 1897, Langtry put White Ladye up for auction in London. She was described as having nine cabins, in addition to those for the captain, crew, and a maid; and three baths. She had a drawing room, whose furniture included a grand piano. Her dining saloon was finished in walnut, and she had also a "deck-house saloon". The cabins included a "boudoir suite" with en-suite dressing room and bathroom. She carried a crew of 31. She carried six boats: a steam launch; a gig; two cutters; and two dinghies. Before putting her up for auction, Langtry had declined an offer of £22,000 for the yacht. However, at auction it sold for only £11,200.

=== With John Johnston ===
The buyer was John Johnston, who had founded Bovril, and had sold his business in 1896. He used White Ladye to cruise Mediterranean and Scottish waters. in 1899 the yacht attended the America's Cup race off New York, between Columbia and Thomas Lipton’s Shamrock. White Ladye was supposed to accompany Lipton's steam yacht Erin, with friends and relatives on both yachts. Johnston understood that he would be able to fly a flag of privilege to enable him to manoeuvre White Ladye within the restricted race area. However, race officials deemed that White Ladye had infringed a restricted zone, and her Captain was severely censured. Further, one of the official cutters policing the event collided White Ladye, damaging both vessels. In 1900 Johnston took a lease on Inveraray Castle, and cruised Scottish waters with White Ladye. She then sailed to Nice in the south of France, where Johnston died aboard her on 24 November 1900.

=== With William Gray ===
After Johnston's death, William Gray acquired White Ladye. He was chairman of the shipbuilder William Gray & Co in West Hartlepool. In 1903 he sent White Ladye to Hull for an overhaul and a new boiler. He had her moored at Dartmouth, Devon, to be near the country estate he had bought at Membland. By 1905 White Ladye was being offered for charter. Bertha Palmer, widow of Potter Palmer of Chicago, chartered her to attend Cowes Week that year. She also rented Egypt House on the seafront in the expectation of entertaining high society. By 1910 she was being offered for sale as well as for charter. However, White Ladye remained registered to William Gray until 1917.

== La Champagne ==
In 1917 White Ladye was sold and converted into a trawler. By September 1918 a Jérome Malandain had acquired and renamed her La Champagne. She was registered in Fécamp, and at first her code letters were JVLW, but by 1921 they had been changed to OKXZ. She was laid up from 1926 in Fécamp, where she was used to test a new slipway in June 1931. By 1934 her call sign was FONA, and this had superseded her code letters. In August 1935 the Belgian tug Directeur Gerling towed her from Fécamp to Ostend, where she was scrapped.

== Bibliography ==
- Daussy, Jack (1991). Les Chalutiers Morutiers Fécampois (in French). Fécamp: M Durand et Fils.
- Lloyd's Register of Shipping. Vol. II.–Steamers. London: Lloyd's Register of Shipping. 1919 – via Internet Archive.
- Lloyd's Register of Shipping. Vol. II.–Steamers. London: Lloyd's Register of Shipping. 1921 – via Internet Archive.
- Lloyd's Register of Shipping (PDF). Vol. I.–Steamers & Motorships under 300 tons. London: Lloyd's Register of Shipping. 1934 – via Southampton City Council.
- Lloyd's Register of Shipping (PDF). Vol. I.–Steamers & Motorships under 300 tons. London: Lloyd's Register of Shipping. 1935 – via Southampton City Council.
- Mercantile Navy List. London. 1892 – via Crew List Index Project.
- Mercantile Navy List. London. 1917 – via Crew List Index Project.
- Yacht Register. London: Lloyd's Register of Shipping. 1892 – via Internet Archive.
- Yacht Register. London: Lloyd's Register of Shipping. 1893 – via Internet Archive.
- Yacht Register. London: Lloyd's Register of Shipping. 1898 – via Internet Archive.
- Yacht Register. London: Lloyd's Register of Shipping. 1902 – via Internet Archive.
