= Science fiction convention =

Science fiction fan gatherings

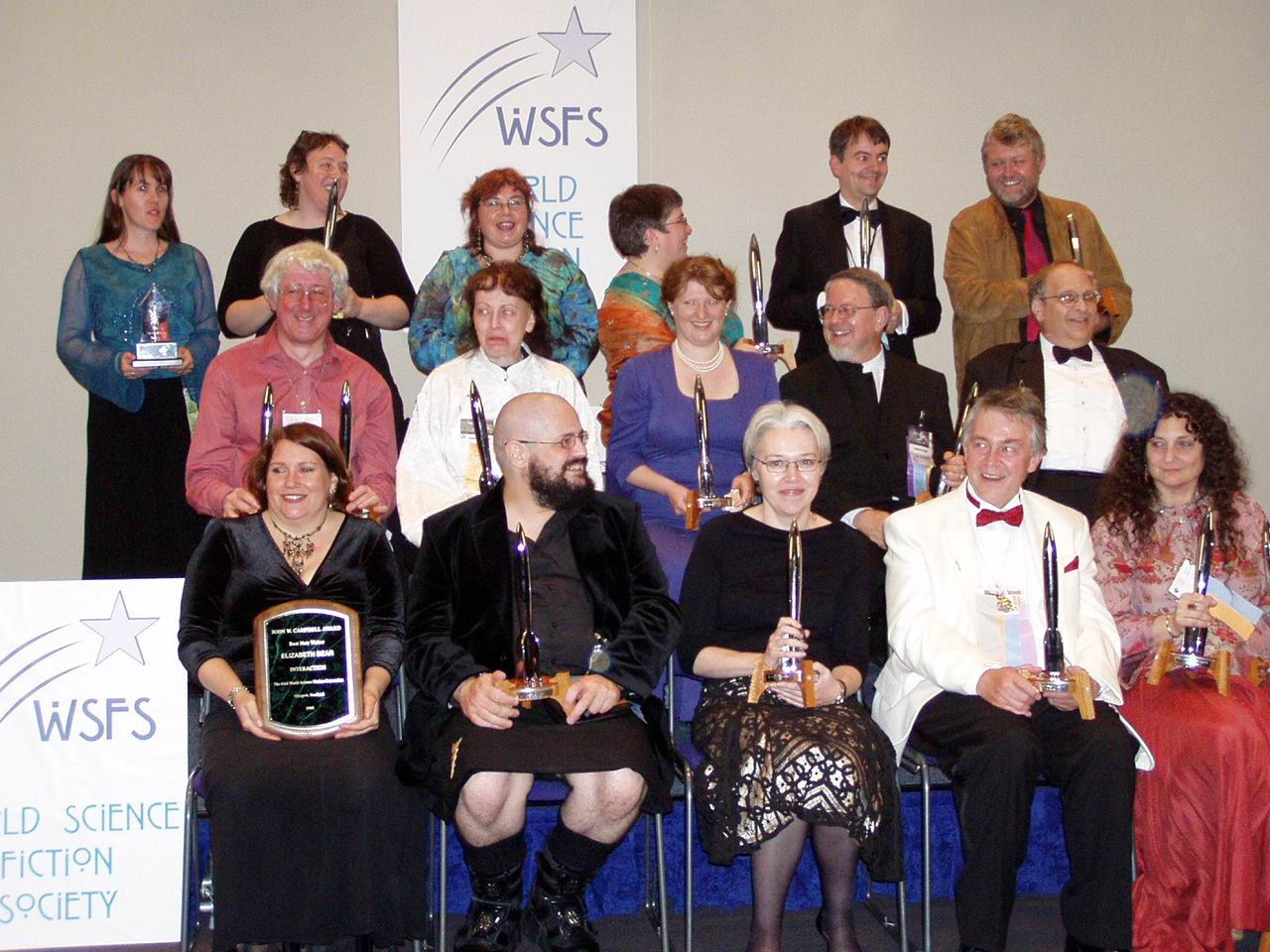
Hugo Award winners at Worldcon 2005 in Glasgow, August 2005.

A science fiction convention is the gathering of fans of the speculative fiction subgenre, science fiction. Historically, science fiction conventions had focused primarily on literature, but the purview of many extends to such other avenues of expression as films, television, comics, animation, and games. The format can vary but will tend to have a few similar features such as a guest of honour, discussion panels, readings and large special events such as opening/closing ceremonies and some form of party or entertainment. Science fiction conventions started off primarily in the United Kingdom and the United States but have now spread further. Several countries have their own individual conventions, as well as playing host to rotating international conventions.

Worldcon, the annual convention of the World Science Fiction Society (WSFS), does not have a permanent board of directors or central committee that manages all conventions. Instead, each year's Worldcon is organized independently by a local committee,operating under the WSFS constitution. Future convention sites are selected through membership vote. Rather than selling tickets, Worldcon sells memberships, which grant access to the convention.

== History ==
The Royal Albert Hall has asserted that the Vril-Ya Bazaar and Fete, a charitable event held at the Hall in 1891, was the world's first science fiction convention. The event was a multi-day fundraising bazaar themed around the popular 1871 science fiction novel The Coming Race by Edward Bulwer-Lytton, which involves the Vril-Ya, a subterranean race of winged superhuman beings. The event at the Royal Albert Hall featured elements similar to those of later science fiction conventions (in particular modern commercial events), such as special guests (although apparently none directly related to the novel or science fiction generally), special events and other performances, set pieces and special effects (such as flying "Vril-Ya" mannequins), costumes (essentially what later came to be called cosplay), and stalls selling merchandise related to the event's theme and named using the Vril-Ya language as presented in the novel. However, the event was not contemporaneously referred to as a science fiction convention and was primarily a fundraiser for the London Massage and Galvanic Hospital, one of a number of such events held with other, non-science fictional, themes put on by the hospital's founder Dr. Herbert Tibbits. (The event not only failed as a fundraiser, but led to Tibbits' personal bankruptcy.)

The precise time and place of the first science fiction convention is a matter of some dispute. The idea and form was clearly anticipated in Robert Bloch's short story about a large convention of writers, "The Ultimate Ultimatum" (Fantasy Magazine, August 1935), "It was a big convention. Lovecraft was there." Sometime in 1936, a group of British fans made plans to have an organized gathering, with a planned program of events in a public venue in early 1937. However, on October 22, 1936, a group of six or seven fans from New York City, including David Kyle and Frederik Pohl, traveled by train to Philadelphia, Pennsylvania, where for several hours they visited a similar number of local fans at the house of Milton A. Rothman. They subsequently declared that event to be the first "science fiction convention." This small get-together set the stage for a follow-up event held in New York, in February 1937, where "30 or 40" fans gathered at Bohemian Hall in Astoria, Queens. Attendees at this event included James Blish, Charles D. Hornig, Julius Schwartz, and Willis Conover. This event came to be known as the "Second Eastern" and set the stage for the successful Third Eastern held in Philadelphia on October 30, 1937, and the subsequent Fourth Eastern held on May 29, 1938, which attracted over 100 attendees to a meeting hall in Newark, NJ and designated itself as "The First National Science Fiction Convention." It was at this event that a committee was named to arrange the first World Science Fiction Convention in New York in 1939; formalizing planning that had begun at the Third Eastern. The "First National", which included the participation of a number of well-known New York editors and professionals from outside fan circles, was a milestone in the evolution of science-fiction conventions as a place for science-fiction (SF) professionals, as well as fans, to meet their colleagues in person.

On January 3, 1937, the British fans held their long-planned event at the Theosophical Hall in Leeds. Around twenty fans, including Eric Frank Russell and Arthur C. Clarke, attended. To this day, many fan historians, especially those in the United Kingdom, contend that the Philadelphia meeting was a convention in name only, whereas other fan historians point out that many similar gatherings since then have been called "conventions" without eliciting any disagreement.

Regardless of what gathering is held to have been the first science fiction convention, American fans had organized sufficiently by 1939 to hold, in conjunction with the 1939 World's Fair, the first "World Science Fiction Convention," in New York City. Subsequent conventions were held in Chicago in 1940 and Denver in 1941. Like many cultural events, it was suspended during World War II. Conventions resumed in 1946 with the hosting of the World Science Fiction Convention in Los Angeles, California. The first Worldcon held outside the United States was Torcon I in Toronto in 1948; since then, Worldcons have been held in Britain, Germany, the Netherlands, Canada, Australia, Japan, Finland, and Ireland although the majority of Worldcons are still held in the United States.

== Types ==
Since the first conventions in the late 1930s, such as the first Worldcon, hundreds of local and regional science fiction conventions have sprung up around the world either as one-time or annual events. At these conventions, fans of science fiction come together with the professional writers, artists, and filmmakers in the genre to discuss its many aspects. Some cities have a number of science-fiction conventions, as well as a number of special interest conventions for anime, media, or other related groups. Some conventions move from city to city, serving a particular country, region, or special interest. Nearly every weekend of the year now has at least one convention somewhere and some conventions are held on holiday weekends where four or more days can be devoted to events.

=== International conventions ===
==== World Science Fiction Convention ====
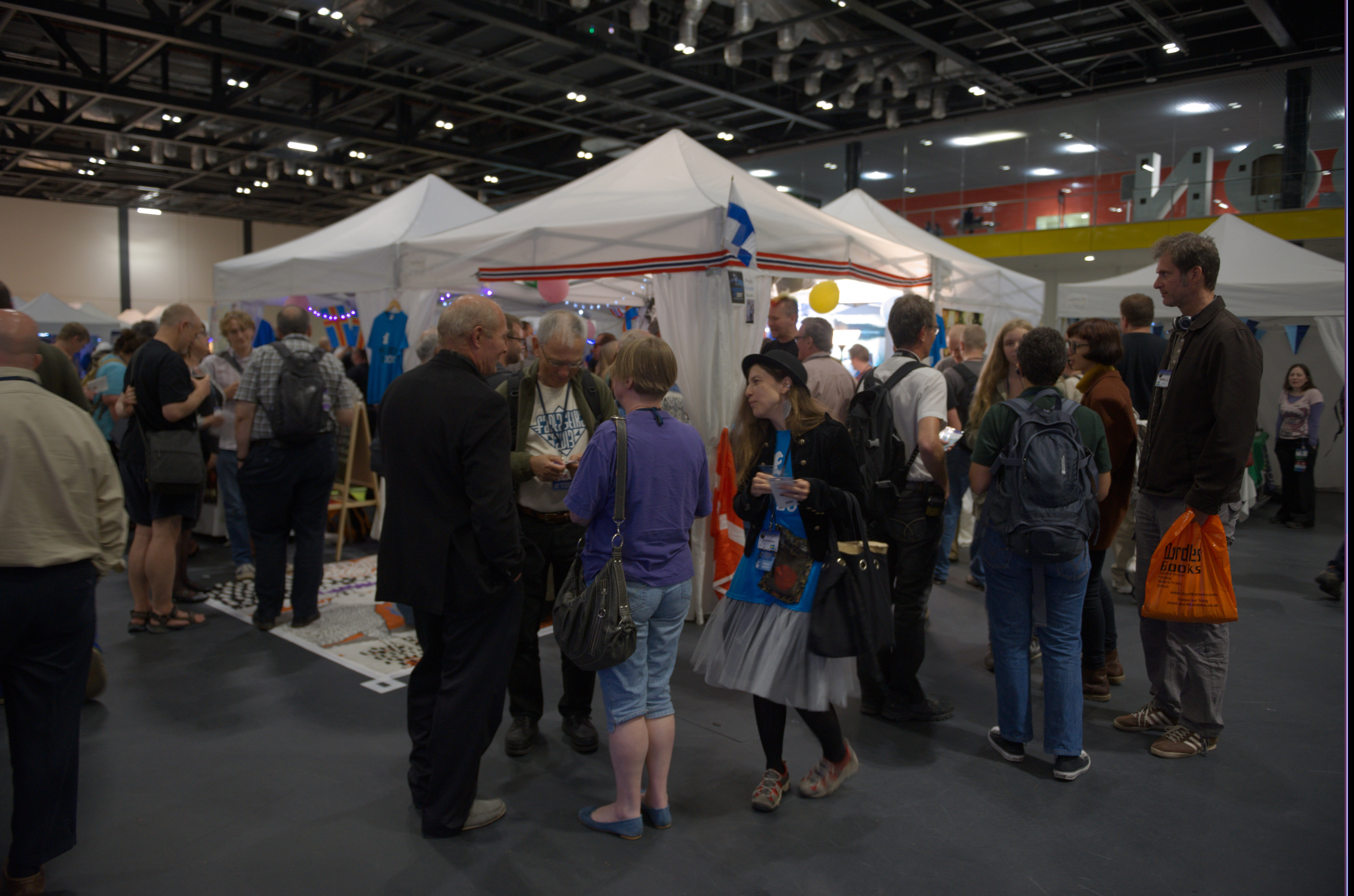
Fans socializing at Worldcon 2014.

Worldcon, or more formally The World Science Fiction Convention, is a science fiction convention that has been held each year since 1939 (except for the years 1942 through 1945, during World War II). It is the annual convention of the World Science Fiction Society (or WSFS), an unincorporated body whose members are defined as "all people who have paid membership dues to the Committee of the current Worldcon" (i.e., that are either upcoming or currently under way). These members of WSFS vote both to select the site of the Worldcon two years in advance and to select the winners of the Hugo Awards, which are presented at the convention. The rules for venue selection are deliberately drafted to ensure the convention occurs in a different city each year.

==== World Fantasy Convention ====
Fantasy is usually considered alongside science fiction at conventions (the terms were used interchangeably for most of the period from 1926–1966). Conventions that are nominally science-fiction conventions, such as Worldcon, are also fantasy conventions in all but name. World Fantasy Convention was begun in 1975, and has since been held on an annual basis. The World Fantasy Convention, however, is less oriented toward the fan community, and is primarily a professional gathering (for writers, editors, publishers, etc.). Many of those who attend "World Fantasy" also attend Worldcon. However, this convention is more focused on authors and publishing, with a much higher proportion of authors in attendance; as such it does not usually include the broad range of events (masquerade, dances, video room, etc.) that one would normally find at a general-interest convention.

==== World Horror Convention ====
The World Horror Convention is an annual gathering of professionals of the World Horror Society and other interested parties. Up till 2009, all World Horror Conventions had been held in the United States or Canada, usually alternating between the east and west sides of the country. The 2010 convention was held in Brighton in the UK, the first time it took place outside North America. The Horror Writers Association's Bram Stoker Award ceremony has been held in conjunction with the convention for the last few years.

=== National conventions ===
A National Convention is usually held annually in a number of countries. The British Eastercon is the oldest of these. National conventions are often run by, or in association with, a national Science-fiction organization or club.

=== Regional conventions ===
Before the age of inexpensive travel, regional conventions arose to attract fans from broad geographical areas. The oldest of these is Westercon, whose meetings are held on a rotational basis among regions in the western United States and Canada. Eurocon is held each year somewhere in Europe, often in eastern European countries where fandom is a new phenomenon. A North American Science Fiction Convention (NASFiC) is held in North America in any year when the Worldcon is outside of North America. DeepSouthCon is held in the Southern United States, with a focus on Southern culture in science fiction.

=== Local conventions ===
Local conventions, which are offshoots of the main regional conventions, draw fans from the immediate area in which the convention is being held, though these have very few attendees who have traveled from afar to attend the main convention. Some local conventions, including events run by student groups from high schools or colleges, draw their attendance solely from the student body and campus neighborhood. Others, such as those run by UK universities, may draw from a wider audience than just the university itself.

=== Media conventions ===
Some conventions are focused on (audio-visual) "media", that is, science fiction on film and television. There are general media conventions covering a broad range of science fiction in media, such as Toronto Trek, and then there are conventions focused on a single body of work, such as "Celebration," the official Star Wars convention; "Galaxyfest," the yearly event in Vulcan, Alberta dedicated to Star Trek; and BotCon, the official Transformers convention. Most media conventions are commercial shows run for profit, though some are organized by non-profit fan groups similar to general science-fiction conventions.

=== Comic and "popular culture" conventions ===
From comics and media fandom, a category of "popular culture" conventions has emerged, such as Comic-Con International and Dragon Con, featuring a wide range of "pop culture" events ranging from animation, drive-in movie theaters, old-time radio, horror movies, and cowboy celebrities. These events have become much larger than traditional SF conventions; nearly a hundred thousand people attend Comic-Con in San Diego each year. Although not all of them are commercial ventures, they tend to suffer the same drawbacks as commercial shows (long lines, overcrowding, etc.) due to the sheer size of the events.

=== Special interest conventions ===
There are many conventions focused on particular special interests within science fiction. For example, Wiscon, in addition to being the Wisconsin Science Fiction Convention, is focused on feminist SF/fantasy and gender, race, and class issues/studies. Diversicon concentrates on the vastness of human diversity. Filking conventions such as Ohio Valley Filk Fest, FilkOntario, and GaFilk gather those interested in science fiction-related music. Costume-Con gathers people from around the world who are mainly interested in science fiction, fantasy, and historical costuming. Penguicon combines science fiction with technology, particularly Linux and open source software. The term "relaxacon" is used for conventions which tend to be less about programming, and more about socializing within the fan community; this is quite different from "sercon" (SERious CONstructive discussion of science-fiction topics) conventions.

=== Commercial shows vs. volunteer conventions ===
An important distinction can be made between commercial events (often called "shows") – those run by dedicated companies who specialize in con organization, or by local for-profit firms – and volunteer-run cons.

Usually run for profit, commercial events tend to charge for "tickets" or "admission" rather than having "memberships". A primary focus of commercial events is meeting celebrities, such as stars of science fiction TV show and movies, anime voice actors, etc. There are frequently very long lines of people waiting for autographs at commercial events; while famous actors like William Shatner of Star Trek are paid tens of thousands of dollars per convention, minor and obscure bit players pay to set up booths to sell autographs and memorabilia. Commercial events also tend to have less small-scale programming; panels will more often be composed of famous actors, directors, etc. on press junkets, where the panels are held in very large rooms with very high attendance. The largest cons (in terms of attendance) tend to be commercial ones. Commercial events tend to be more likely to be about comics, manga, anime, and popular visual media than volunteer cons, and they also tend to attract the younger generation, but this is not absolute by any means. Some commercial conventions have official licences from the company which produces a particular movie or TV show to run a convention about a particular movie or show. They have been known to aggressively go after fan-run conventions via their legal teams.

Volunteer cons, on the other hand, tend to be smaller in scope and more intimate in character. Panels may be more lightly attended; however, it is the fans themselves who mostly take part in the panels. Although there are frequent autograph sessions, they tend to be less of an attraction for volunteer cons. Admission to volunteer cons is usually called "membership", thus emphasizing that the fans themselves are the ones who make up the con, rather than the staff who run commercial cons. A community of fans who run such conventions has developed, and many of them share their best practices and keep convention-running traditions alive, including at specialist con-running conventions such as SMOFcon.

== Anatomy of a typical convention ==
Although wide variations exist between different conventions, there is a general pattern to which most adhere.

=== Guests of honor ===
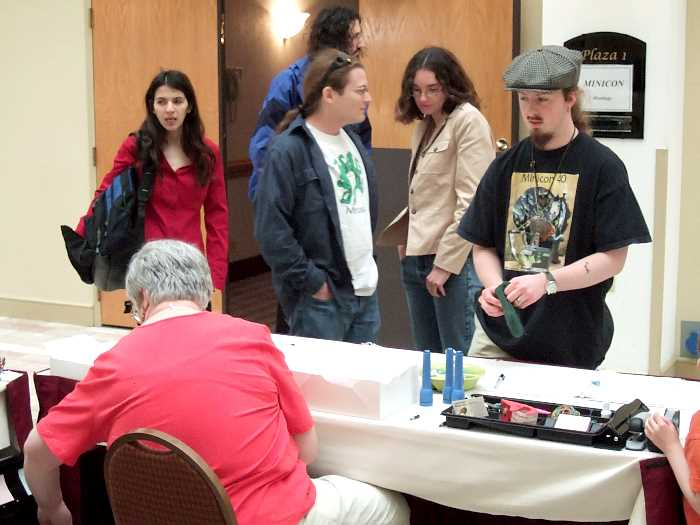
Fans registering for Minicon 41

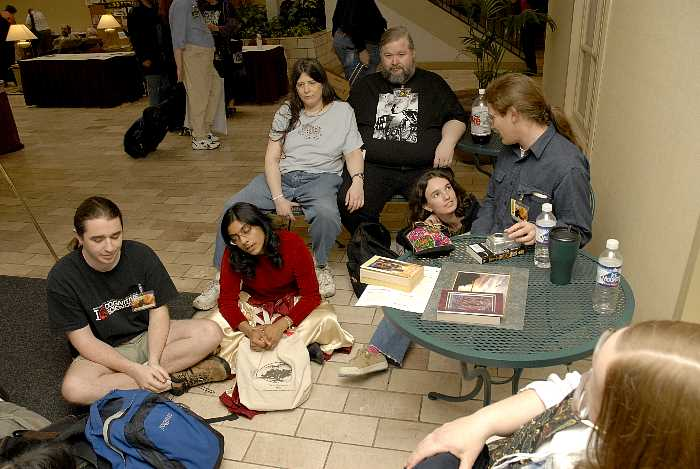
Hanging out in the lobby

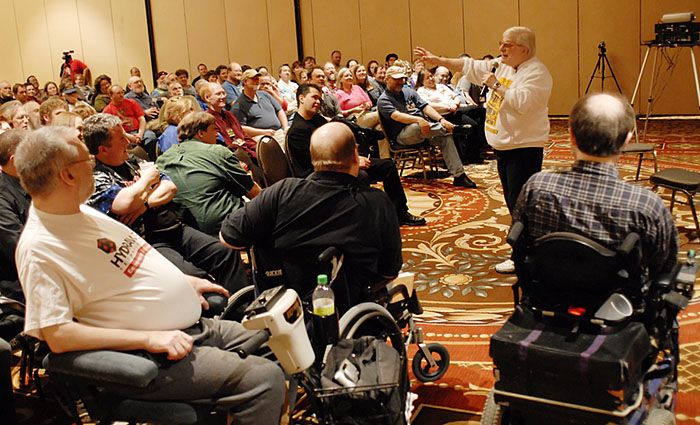
Harlan Ellison speaking

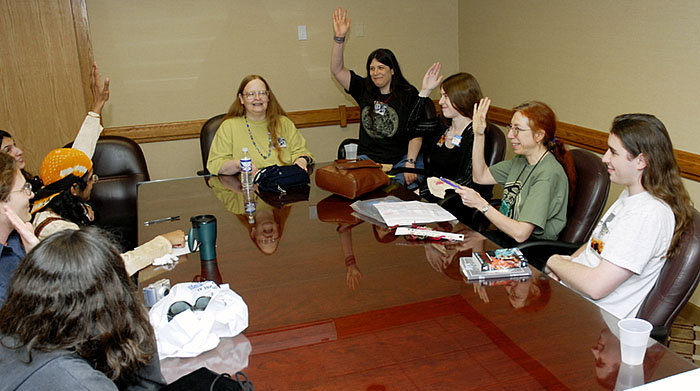
Pamela Dean reading

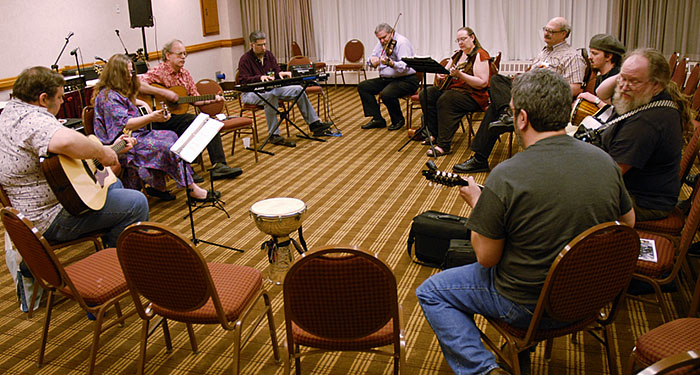
Informal music session (AKA filk circle)

Most conventions have Guest(s) of Honor (GoH). These guests are to some extent the headliners of the convention. A convention may have as many Guests of Honor as the convention committee wishes. Along with Author and perhaps Fan Guests of Honor (fans who are not necessarily celebrities but have made a significant contribution to the fan community), a convention may have an Artist GoH, Editor GoH, Filk or Music GoH, a Toastmaster, and Special Guests. A Memorial Guest of Honor (as at Readercon) or Ghost of Honor (as at Worldcon 2008/Denvention 3) is a deceased individual who is selected as a focal point of the festivities. Potlatch, however, has an annual Book of Honor instead.

=== Professionals at conventions ===
Conventions provide a forum for fans to see first-hand and meet their favorite authors and artists. They also serve the interests of authors, editors, and other publishing professionals, providing opportunities for networking, promotion, and a convenient location for contract negotiations and other business meetings. At traditional science-fiction conventions, there is little or no distinction made between the "pros" and the "fans". Many professionals in the field began as fans, and may still consider themselves fans; and more than a few fans have also worked professionally or semi-professionally in the field. At a small number of cons, there is a category for "Attending Professionals", professionals who are paying full con price to enter but also get a special name badge that proclaims them to be professionals in whatever field they are involved in.

=== Program ===
Panel-led discussions, or Panels, usually fill up the daytime hours of most conventions with typically one-hour discussions of topics related to science fiction, fantasy, and fandom in general. Some conventions have well-attended, scheduled panels starting as late as midnight. Panel members (even professionals) are not customarily paid for their appearance, although many North-American conventions waive membership fees for program participants or rebate them after the convention.

Some program items are set presentations by experts. Science speakers are among the most popular program items at many conventions. Slides (either photographic or computer), video clips, or handouts might be used for such presentations.

Readings and "kaffeeklatsches" are program items where a single author either reads from their work or has an informal discussion with fans.

=== Special events ===
On the first night of the convention, opening ceremonies are often held, where organizers and marquee guests are introduced and speeches might be made. Sometimes, conventions will have a skits, musical performances, video clips, or other samples of the convention as part of the opening ceremonies.

A costume contest called a masquerade is often held where persons go on stage and compete for nominal prizes based on their skill in assembling and presenting genre-inspired outfits. This, however, would be more accurately labelled a "talent show" rather than the "fancy dress ball" that the term suggests (although British fandom sometimes uses the term "fancy dress"). Anime fans might refer to the masquerade as cosplay, but there are notable and subtle distinctions between the terms.

Some conventions feature award ceremonies, in which the best works and most notable individuals are recognized for their contributions to the field. Worldcon has several award ceremonies, most notably the Hugo Awards, but also the Sidewise Award for Alternate History and other awards. VCON in Vancouver, BC features the Elron Awards for dubious distinctions in science fiction, including an annual award for John Norman author of the Gor series.

Just as art shows display the visual aspect of science fiction, many conventions include concerts or other music-oriented events as part of the convention. Often these are performances by filkers, though other musicians may also appear at a con.

A convention may have one or more auctions. The Art Auction is an event where the most popular items from the art show are sold to the most interested buyers at the convention. Many conventions also have auctions for charities, either formal or fannish; the latter would include auctions on behalf of TAFF (the Trans-Atlantic Fan Fund) or DUFF (the Down Under Fan Fund).

Evening entertainment often includes a combination of official and unofficial events, including concerts, dances, formal invitational dinners, and fandom-themed room parties. Additionally, other convention committees hold room parties in order to promote their own convention and to increase their membership. A bid party is a room party held to influence the choice of the location of a future convention (such as Worldcon) by advertising its advantages.

Some conventions have a Closing Ceremony to formally mark the end of the convention. Depending on the convention, this can be a major gathering of most of the membership, or it may be lightly attended or dispensed with entirely as members are occupied with packing up and checking out of the hotel.

=== Exhibits and fixed functions ===
A Dealers' or Hucksters' Room is available, where merchants sell wares which may be of interest to fans. These include books, action figures, prop replicas and t-shirts. Similarly, there is often an Art Show where genre-inspired art is displayed and usually made available for auction or purchase. Smaller conventions may simply have an informal Dealers' Row, a section of hotel rooms from which dealers sell goods, while larger conventions may have both an official dealers' room and an unofficial dealers' row.

The Art Show is generally an open art exhibition; that is, it is open to all comers and all art submitted is exhibited for sale. This naturally leads to a wide variety of types of artwork, from professional illustrations to outsider art, with many amateur works. The subject matter is tailored to the interests of fandom, i. e. many spaceships, dragons, unicorns, vampires, cat girls etc. Art shows often permit sales by artists, these sales constituting a significant source of income for some artists.

Traditionally, many conventions have had video rooms in which genre-related audiovisual presentations take place, typically commercial Hollywood movies, genre television show episodes, and anime. If there are multiple media rooms, each one may have themed content. Larger conventions may also have a genuine Film Room, for presentation of actual movies on film instead of video.

Game Rooms are also available at some conventions for attendees to play a variety of genre games, including collectible card games like Magic: The Gathering, role-playing games like Dungeons and Dragons, miniatures games like Warhammer 40,000, and board games like The Settlers of Catan. Easy, fast-playing card games, e.g. Apples to Apples, are popular as they don't require a large time commitment or deep knowledge of rules, thus allowing casual gamers to join in.

=== Con suite ===
At North American conventions, a convention hospitality suite or consuite is often provided as a room reserved for light refreshments, a quiet conversation, and a place to briefly rest. The refreshments typically include coffee, tea, juice or soda, and light meals appropriate for the time of day. Depending on local liquor distribution and liability laws, the suite may serve alcohol. At conventions in the rest of the world, the hotel or convention centre bar typically offers the same social function. At conventions in the United Kingdom, the provision of cask ale is usual.

=== Dead dog party ===
Many conventions have a "dead dog party" in the evening of the last day of the convention, after closing ceremonies. This is the traditional winding-down party where the remaining attendees are unlikely to have huge amounts of energy. This party is an attempt to ease people back into the real world outside of the convention and can be an effective method of warding off the depression which is often associated with the end of a major event. A dead dog party can last until the following morning.

=== Idiosyncrasy ===
Many con-goers take pride in being interesting and unusual, and naturally many cons are highly idiosyncratic. Cons often have activities, running jokes, organizational methods and other features that not only differentiate them from other cons but are often a point of pride. Most cons vary from the above outline in one or more important ways, and many have their own unique cultural characteristics.

For example:

- Capricon in Wheeling, Illinois, always includes an entire track of spoof programming. Originally held in the Phineas Taylor B room, it is now slated for the Lake Wobegon room.
- At an early Minicon, the president of Mnstf (the con's sponsoring organization) declared himself to be president for life. This was resolved by play-assassinating the president. Ever since then, the president has been "assassinated" by various humorous means at closing ceremonies.
- Many cons have idiosyncratic names, including puns, in-jokes, or portmanteaus.

Most cons will tend to evolve many of their own idiosyncrasies along these lines. To fans, these are often part of the charm each convention offers.

=== Peace-bonding and weapons policies ===
A peace-bond is a conspicuous lock, tie, or mark which makes or identifies something unusable, such as a weapon, and shows that the owner's intentions are purely peaceful.

At some conventions, attendees carry real weapons or costume props that appear to be weapons. To forestall concerns about mis-use of real weapons at such events, the security team "peace-bonds" anything that might look like a weapon.

The event's "weapons policy" may offer objective criteria to determine what looks like a weapon. For example, a weapons policy may require a peace-bond for anything that a reasonable person might recognize as a weapon from a short distance in dim light. Real weapons, if allowed, are disabled, secured, and marked. For example, bright orange zip ties may be used to hold a sword in a scabbard or to hold a pistol in a holster. Simulated or costume props may require conspicuous marks, such as bright ribbons or zip ties, to show that security has deemed them safe to be carried. Simulated weapons or props which can be used as a weapon may be disabled or secured in the way as real weapons.

Peace-bonding helps security control the use or abuse of real weapons at a convention or other event: anything that looks like a weapon but which is not peace-bonded is immediately deemed to be suspicious. SF writer C. J. Cherryh writes on her website, "I was a witness of pre-peacebonding times, was narrowly missed, and assure you this is a good idea. Read the convention weapons policy."

== See also ==
- Anime convention
- Fan convention
- Furry convention
- Gaming convention
- List of science fiction conventions
