= Vril-Ya Bazaar and Fete =

1891 science fiction convention in London

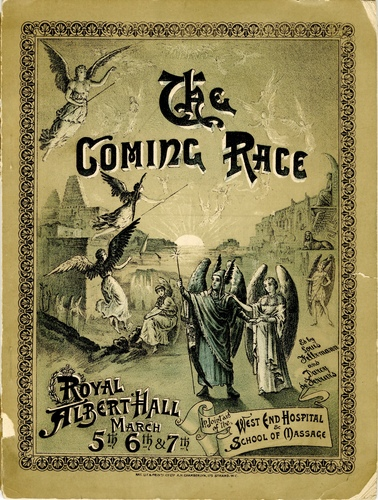
Cover of the programme for the event

The Vril-Ya Bazaar and Fete (more fully billed as 'The Coming Race' and 'Vril-Ya' Bazaar and Fete, in joint aid of The West End Hospital, and the School of Massage and Electricity) was an event held March 5–10, 1891 at the Royal Albert Hall in the British capital of London. It was organized by Herbert Tibbits to celebrate The Coming Race, an 1871 science fiction novel by Edward Bulwer-Lytton. The Royal Albert Hall and others have described the event as the world's first science fiction convention.

== History ==
Tibbits was the founder of the London Massage and Galvanic Hospital, and the Vril-Ya Bazaar was one of a number of events he had produced as fundraisers for the hospital. For each, Tibbits recruited wealthy and socially prominent individuals as a host committee for the event.

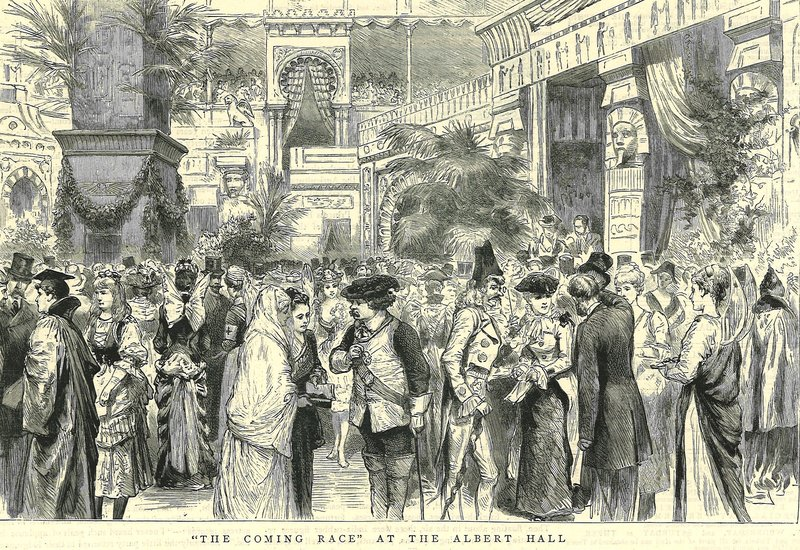
Illustration of the event

For the 1891 event, Tibbits chose as the theme the world created by Bulwer-Lytton in The Coming Race. The novel features a subterranean race of winged superhuman beings, the "Vril-ya", with telepathic and other parapsychological abilities who wield vast power derived from "Vril", a mysterious form of energy that the Vril-ya are able to control through their miraculous skills. In the years following its publication, the novel had achieved widespread popularity, and some occultists claimed that Bulwer-Lytton had based his novel on an actual secret race that had mastered a limitless energy source.

Diagram of hall showing stalls

Tibbits' fundraising event sought to exploit the popularity of the novel. Bulwer-Lytton had described the architecture of the underground Vril-ya city as resembling the architecture of ancient Egypt, Sumeria, and India, and Tibbits had the Royal Albert Hall decorated with Egyptian artistic motifs, including a grand Pillar of Vril-ya, modeled on Cleopatra's Needle.

Suspended, and sometimes moving as if flying, above the crowd were mannequins costumed as the winged Vril-ya. Entertainments were presented that sought to evoke the mystical powers of the Vril-ya, with magic shows and a fortune-telling dog. Booths offered various products and handcrafts for sale, including Bovril, a meat extract that had been named, in part, for Vril power in The Coming Race.

The event featured a young woman depicting Princess Zee, the heroine of the novel, who wore a black satin dress and tiara that featured electric lights. Words from Bulwer-Lytton's invented Vril language were used to describe features of the event, and attendees were provided with a brochure that included a Vril glossary to help them decipher the language.

Guests were encouraged to wear costumes, and event organizers directed them to the firm John Simmons and Sons, historical costumiers to Queen Victoria, to view an array of Coming Race costumes, many sporting wings. The volunteer committee members wore various exotic costumes from a range of cultures and eras.

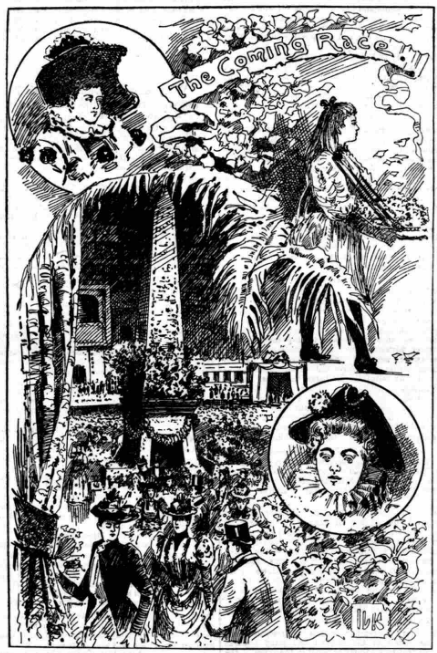
Illustration of the event from "The Examiner", 14th March 1891

The youngest child of Queen Victoria, Princess Beatrice and her husband Prince Henry of Battenberg attended on the first day to officially open the event. The host committee that Tibbits recruited to help organize the event and staff the stalls included the Marchioness Dowager of Londonderry, the Countess of Cromarty and Lady Georgiana Spencer Churchill.

== Reception ==
The event was originally scheduled to run for only three days, but the organizers extended it for an additional two days, "due to popular demand". However, reviews of the event were unfavorable. Newspapers criticized decorations as badly constructed and shabby. A reviewer in the Leeds Times called it "a very sorry affair, inartistic, stupid ... a vulgar entertainment in the name of charity". Despite the extended run, the event was a financial failure. Tibbits had covered the costs associated with holding the event from his own funds, and the failure of the event to bring in expected revenues bankrupted him.
