= Silvia Lawson Johnston =

- Born: Silvia Lawson Johnston née Roigt; 1940; Buenos Aires
- Died: 16 October 2025 (aged 84–85)
- Education: International School of Geneva (Ecolint)
- Spouse: Hon Arthur Charles St John Lawson Johnston (1959-1970)
- Children: Three

Silvia Lawson Johnston née Roigt (born 1940) was the founder of the first short term housing rental agency in London, England, where she had lived since 1959. The daughter of author, journalist and Argentine diplomat Don Honorio Roigt, on moving to Great Britain she married the fine art dealer Arthur Charles St John Lawson Johnston, later Lord Luke.

== Early and personal life ==
Silvia (née Roigt) was born in Buenos Aires. In her early years she emigrated to the United States, where her father was working with the United Nations as a diplomat before his later work as the Argentinian ambassador to Yugoslavia and The Netherlands. She was educated at the International School of Geneva (Ecolint) and came to England in 1959 to be married to the Hon Arthur Charles St John Lawson Johnston. They had three children: Rachel, Ian James and Sophie.

== Career ==
Silvia and Arthur divorced in 1970, after which Silvia entered the London residential property market as sales negotiator for Robert Bruce and partners. In 1980 she joined Brian D'Arcy-Clark and Owen Inskip, the founders of Chesterfields Estate Agents in Chelsea. In 1984 Silvia co founded People and Property, a relocation service specializing in the field of international banking. In 1990 she launched A Place Like Home, a letting agency offering international visitors to London the opportunity to short let properties in Knightsbridge, Belgravia, Chelsea and Kensington. Today in excess of forty thousand visitors have used A Place Like Home's services.

== See also ==
- Arthur Lawson Johnston
