= Edith Lawson Johnston, Baroness Luke =

English girl guide leader (1879–1941)

The Right Honourable The Lady Luke
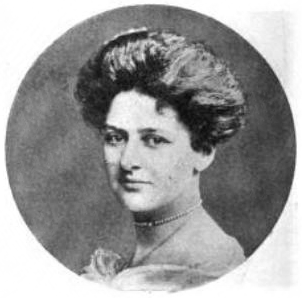
- Lady Lawson Johnston in 1902
- Born: Edith Laura St John; October 1879; Bromyard, UK
- Died: 1 August 1941 (aged 61); Bedford, UK
- Spouse: George Lawson Johnston, 1st Baron Luke (m. 1902)
- Children: 6
- Father: Beauchamp St John, 17th Baron St John of Bletso

Edith Laura Lawson Johnston, Baroness Luke (née St John; October 1879 - 1 August 1941) was the first County Commissioner for Bedfordshire Girl Guides, between 1916 and 1937. She was a recipient of the Silver Fish Award, the Girl Guiding movement’s highest adult honour.

== Personal life ==
Born Hon. Edith Laura St John, she was the seventh of twelve children born to Beauchamp St John, 17th Baron St John of Bletso and Helen Charlotte St John née Thornton. She grew up in Melchbourne Park and played the organ at the village church from the age of 13 until she was married.

She married George Lawson Johnston, 1st Baron Luke (1873-1943) in 1902. Their London home was in Portman Square and their Bedfordshire home was Pavenham Bury. George was British National Chair of the International Chamber of Commerce which necessitated a significant amount of travel. By 1904, Edith had visited South Africa, Canada, USA, South America and Australia. She made 17 trips to Argentina. In 1922 they built a house, called ‘’Pavenham’’, in Santa Fe, Argentina. A 1932 newspaper article reported that she had travelled 300,000 miles.

She and Johnston had four daughters and two sons. Her daughter Margaret married James Pitman. Her son Hugh married Audrey (Pearl) Lawson-Johnston, the last survivor of the sinking of the Lusitania in 1915. She held “original but common-sense views on education and the bringing-up of children”, blaming “modern parents for allowing their debutante daughters to become powdered, painted and blasé young women, dazzled with the gaiety of society but bored with life.” She believed in the “first principles of the Christian faith – to help and think of others and live a life of usefulness.”

Johnston was made KBE in 1920, and in 1929, raised to the peerage as Lord Luke of Pavenham, making Edith Lady Luke of Pavenham. ‘Luke’ was taken from St Luke, a physician, in reference to Lord Luke’s association with hospitals; as he sat on more hospital committees than anyone else at the time.

Lady Luke was opposed to the ‘Flapper Vote’, which gave women aged 21–29 the right to vote, stating: “I don’t consider that any girl or boy has stabilised views at the age of twenty-one. They have views – and excellent views – but they don’t last.”

She also had strong feelings about women with private incomes taking paid work. In 1929 she was quoted as saying “I refuse to go to hat shops run by any of my friends. My view is that there is plenty of philanthropic work to be done by women who have private incomes.”

Lady Luke died in Bedford after short illness.

== Girl Guides ==
Lady Luke was Bedfordshire Girl Guiding’s first County Commissioner, from 1916 to 1937. She was responsible for the creation of the Bedfordshire County Standard in 1927, which was dedicated in 1933. She was a member of the Guiding Movement’s National Council. She was also the Girl Guide Association’s representative for Argentina, Brazil, Uruguay and Chile, making bi-annual visits to each country. Upon her retirement as County Commissioner, she was called “one of the best friends the Guides movement ever had.”

== Other community service ==
Lady Luke and her husband had an interest in “over 20 philanthropic institutions and societies.” Her roles included:

- 1914 – 1938: Soldiers’ Sailors’ and Airmen’s Families Association, City of London, hon. secretary
- 1914 – 1919: Red Cross and St John War Organisation Supply, chair
- 1921 – 1941: Bedfordshire Education Committee, member
- 1930s – Ladies’ Association of the Royal Northern Group of Hospitals, chair
- 1931 –Bedfordshire Lace Association, president
- 1938 – 1941: Soldiers’ Sailors’ and Airmen’s Families Association, Bedfordshire, president
- 1939 – 1941: Women’s Voluntary Service (WVS), Bedfordshire – including formation of a canteen service for evacuees and involvement in the War Savings Campaign, county organiser
- League of Mercy - lady president
- Order of St John - lady president
- Bedfordshire Women’s Institute, president
- Chair, County Nursing Association, Bedfordshire
- 1920s - Vice Chair, War Pensions Committee of the City of London
- Oakley group of Council Schools, manager
- Maternity and Child Welfare Committee, member
- Higher Education Committee, member
- Bedfordshire Agricultural Committee, member

Luke also supported the Bedford Girls’ Hostel and the Parents' National Educational Union.

== Awards ==
- 1933 – Silver Fish Award
- Order of Mercy and bar
