= Moubray St John, 19th Baron St John of Bletso =

English peer

- Born: 5 November 1877
- Died: 28 October 1934 (aged 56); London, England
- Spouse(s): Evelyn Russell (m. 1905, died) Elizabeth Sanford
- Children: 6, including John
- Father: Beauchamp St John
- Relatives: Henry St John (brother); St Andrew St John (grandfather)
- Military career
- Rank: Captain
- Units: Imperial Yeomanry; King's Own Scottish Borderers
- Commands: Bedfordshire Regiment
- Wars: Second Boer War; World War I

Moubray St Andrew Thornton St John, 19th Baron St John of Bletso DL JP (5 November 1877 – 28 October 1934) was an English peer.

== Life ==
St John was the second son of Beauchamp St John, 17th Baron St John of Bletso and Helen Charlotte, née Thornton. He was educated at Wellington College. Following the outbreak of the Second Boer War he volunteered for service with the Imperial Yeomanry, and served in South Africa from 1899 to 1902. He took part in operations in Transvaal in May and June 1900, including actions at Johannesburg and Pretoria. In October 1900 he was commissioned a second lieutenant in the 1st battalion of the King's Own Scottish Borderers, stationed in South Africa, and the following year served in Transvaal, west of Pretoria. He was promoted to lieutenant on 12 May 1902. He later served in World War I, having rejoined the army in the Reserve of Officers, and in 1918 was a captain in the Bedfordshire Regiment. In 1920, he inherited the title from his brother to become 18th Lord St John, and lived at Melchbourne Park.

St John was a member of the Electoral Committee of the Houses of Parliament from 1925 to 1931. He was DL and JP for Bedfordshire. He died at 5 Ennismore Gardens, South Kensington on 28 October 1934 at the age of 57.

== Family ==
St John married Evelyn Geraldine Russell, younger daughter of Captain Andrew Russell of Petersfield, in 1905 and after five daughters had a son and heir John. After his wife died he married again to Elizabeth May Sanford, widow of Colonel E C A Sanford, and daughter of Lloyd Griffith.

Peerage of England
Preceded by Henry St John	Baron St John of Bletso; 1920–1934	Succeeded by John St John
