= Henry St John, 18th Baron St John of Bletso =

English peer

- Born: 24 June 1876
- Died: 17 October 1920 (aged 44)
- Education: Magdalene College, Cambridge
- Father: Beauchamp St John
- Relatives: Moubray St John (brother); St Andrew St John (grandfather)

Henry Beauchamp Oliver St John, 18th Baron St John of Bletso DL (24 June 1876 – 17 October 1920) was an English peer.

== Biography ==
He was the eldest son of Beauchamp St John, 17th Baron St John of Bletso, and his wife Helen Thornton. He was educated at Wellington College and Magdalene College, Cambridge. On 26 July 1901, he was made a deputy lieutenant of Bedfordshire. Henry became the 17th Lord St John on the death of his father in 1912, and inherited Melchbourne Park. He was a JP for Bedfordshire and described as Church of England Conservative.

He owned about 8,000 acres (32 km^{2}) and gave his interests as county pursuits and county business. He died unmarried at the age of 44 and was succeeded by his younger brother, Moubray.

Peerage of England
Preceded by Beauchamp St John	Baron St John of Bletso; 1912–1920	Succeeded by Moubray St John
