= Baron Luke =

Barony in the Peerage of the United Kingdom

Baron Luke, of Pavenham in the County of Bedford, is a title in the Peerage of the United Kingdom. It was created in 1929 for the businessman George Lawson Johnston. He was the second son of John Lawson Johnston, the founder of Bovril Ltd. As of 2015 the title is held by his great-grandson, the fourth Baron, who succeeded his father in 2015. The third baron was one of the ninety elected hereditary peers to remain in the House of Lords after the passing of the House of Lords Act 1999. He sat on the Conservative benches until resigning from the House in 2015.

== Barons Luke (1929) ==
- George Lawson Johnston, 1st Baron Luke (1873–1943)
- Ian St John Lawson Johnston, 2nd Baron Luke (1905–1996)
- Arthur Charles St John Lawson Johnston, 3rd Baron Luke (1933–2015)
- Ian James St. John Lawson Johnston, 4th Baron Luke (b. 1963)

The heir apparent is the present holder's son Samuel Arthur St. John Lawson Johnston (b. 2000).

== Arms ==
Coat of arms of Baron Luke
Crest A spur between two wings Or. Escutcheon Argent on a saltire Sable between four daggers points downwards Gules the sun in his splendour Or on a chief of the third three cushions of the fourth. Supporters Dexter a heron sinister a flamingo both Proper. Motto Nunquam Non Paratus (Never Unprepared)
