= Vril =

1871 novel by Edward Bulwer-Lytton

The Coming Race
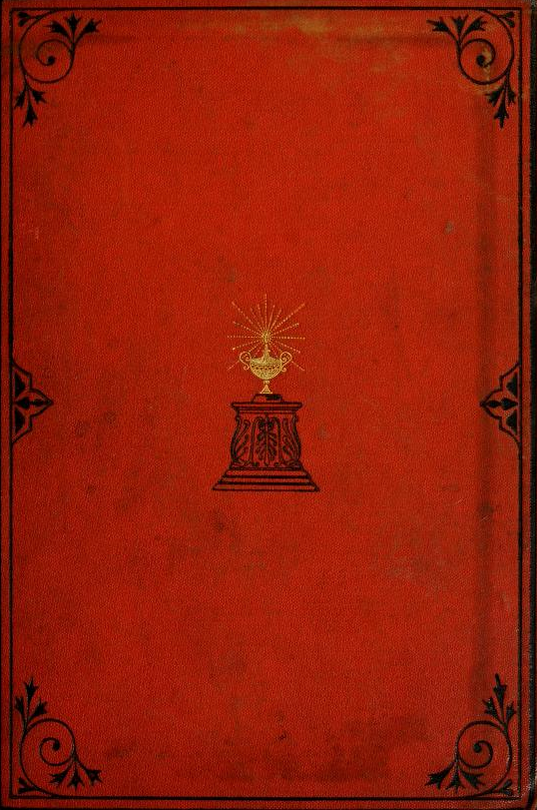
- Cover of one 1871 Blackwood "edition"
- Author: Edward Bulwer-Lytton
- Genre: Science fiction novel Subterranean fiction
- Publisher: William Blackwood and Sons
- Publication date: May 1871
- Publication place: United Kingdom
- Media type: Print (hardcover)
- Pages: 292
- OCLC: 7017241
- Dewey Decimal: 823.8
- LC Class: HX811 1871 .L9
- Text: The Coming Race at Wikisource

Vril: The Power of the Coming Race, originally published as The Coming Race, is a science and subterranean fiction novel by the British politician and writer Edward Bulwer-Lytton, published anonymously in 1871.

Some readers have believed the account of a superior subterranean master race and the energy-form called "Vril" to be, at least partially, true. Some theosophists, notably Helena Blavatsky, William Scott-Elliot, and Rudolf Steiner, accepted the book as based on occult truth. The 1960 book The Morning of the Magicians by Jacques Bergier and Louis Pauwels suggested that a secret Vril Society existed in Weimar Berlin.

The name "Vril" was apparently derived from the word virile.

== History ==
The original British edition, titled as The Coming Race, was published anonymously in May 1871 by Blackwood and Sons of Edinburgh and London. Blackwood published four more impressions in 1871. Anonymous American and Canadian editions were published in August 1871 as The Coming Race or The New Utopia by Francis B. Felt & Co. in New York City and by Copp, Clark & Co. in Toronto. Erewhon, which was published anonymously in March 1872, was initially assumed to be a sequel to The Coming Race, which by then Bulwer-Lytton was known to have written. When it was revealed that Samuel Butler was the author of Erewhon in the 25 May 1872 issue of The Athenaeum, sales dropped by 90 per cent.

== Plot summary ==
A young, independent, wealthy traveller (the Narrator) visits a friend, a mining engineer. They explore a natural chasm in a mine which has been exposed by an exploratory shaft. Using a grappling hook and rope, the Narrator reaches the bottom of the chasm safely, but as the engineer follows, the hook dislodges and the engineer falls to his death. The Narrator is unable to ascend back up the chasm, so makes his way into a subterranean world occupied by beings who in some ways seem to resemble angels and their face that of a sphinx. They have a skin tone similar to that of Amerindians, however "richer and softer", large black eyes, and "brows arched as a semicircle". He befriends the first being he meets, who guides him around a city that is reminiscent of ancient Egyptian architecture. The Narrator meets his host's wife, two sons and daughter who learn to speak English by way of a makeshift dictionary during which the narrator unconsciously teaches them the language.

The Narrator discovers that these beings, who call themselves Vril-ya, have great telepathic and other parapsychological abilities, such as being able to transmit information, get rid of pain, and put others to sleep. The Narrator is offended by the idea that the Vril-ya are better adapted to learn about him than he is to learn about them. Nevertheless, the guide (who turns out to be a magistrate) and his son Taë behave kindly towards him.

The Narrator soon discovers that the Vril-ya are descendants of an antediluvian civilisation called the Ana, who live in networks of caverns linked by tunnels. Originally surface-dwellers, they fled underground thousands of years ago to escape a massive flood and gained greater power by facing and dominating the harsh conditions of the Earth. The place where the Narrator descended houses 12,000 families, one of the largest groups and at the upper limit of population size before a chunk of the population will be splintered off and sent to build a new city on un-inhabited land. Their society is a technologically supported Utopia, chief among their tools being an "all-permeating fluid" called "Vril", a latent source of energy that the spiritually elevated hosts are able to master through training of their will, to a degree that depends on their hereditary constitution. This mastery gives them access to an extraordinary force that can be controlled at will. It is this fluid that the Vril-ya employ to communicate with the Narrator. The powers of the Vril include the ability to heal, change, and destroy beings and things; the destructive powers in particular are immense, allowing a few young Vril-ya children to destroy entire cities if necessary.

Men (called An, pronounced "Arn") and women (called Gy, pronounced "Gee") have equal rights. The women are stronger, larger, and more sensitive to Vril than the men. The women are also the pursuing party in romantic relationships. They marry for three years, after which the men choose whether to remain married, or be single. The female may then pursue a new husband. However, they seldom make the choice to remarry.

Their religion posits the existence of a superior being but does not dwell on his nature. The Vril-ya believe in the permanence of life, which according to them is not destroyed but merely changes form.

The Narrator adopts the attire of his hosts and begins also to adopt their customs. The guide's daughter, Zee is a researcher and enjoys spending time with the Narrator in order to learn about the inferior "barbarian". Over time, Zee begins to feel affection for the Narrator and this affection develops into love. Zee becomes possessive and begins to openly court the Narrator. Instinctively understanding that he may be in danger, the Narrator asks Zee's father to intervene. Due to societal customs, Zee's father refuses the request; however, the guide informs the narrator unequivocally that if he succumbs to Zee's seduction, he will be killed in order to prevent the contamination of the genetics of the Vril-ya. To further complicate matters, a young Vril-ya princess also falls in love with the Narrator, and she too aggressively pursues the Narrator, creating a rivalry between the two Gy and deepening the Narrator's predicament. The princess eventually confesses her infatuation and intentions to her father creating an untenable threat to the common good of the Vril-ya society. Taë is instructed to take the Narrator back to the location where he had originally entered the realm and to kill him with his staff. The Narrator is able to plead for reprieve and eventually both Taë and Zee conspire against the murderous plan. Zee uses her powers of flight to carry the Narrator up through the same chasm which he first descended. As they part, Zee tells the Narrator to think of her once in a while and that she will search for him in the next life, then departs, leaving the Narrator to make his way out of the mine shaft alone. After safely returning to the surface, the Narrator resumes a normal life without disclosing the existence of the Vril-ya. After he has retired, he finds himself diagnosed with an undisclosed fatal disease. At that point he then decides to record his experiences and warns that in time the Vril-ya will run out of habitable space underground and will claim the surface of the Earth, destroying mankind in the process, if necessary.

== Vril in the novel ==
The uses of Vril in the novel amongst the Vril-ya vary from destruction to healing. According to Zee, the daughter of the narrator's host, Vril can be changed into the mightiest agency over all types of matter, both animate and inanimate. It can destroy like lightning or replenish life, heal, or cure. It is used to rend ways through solid matter. Its light is said to be steadier, softer and healthier than that from any flammable material. It can also be used as a power source for animating mechanisms. Vril can be harnessed by use of the Vril staff or mental concentration.

A Vril staff is an object in the shape of a wand or a staff which is used as a channel for Vril. The narrator describes it as hollow with "stops", "keys", or "springs" in which Vril can be altered, modified, or directed to either destroy or heal. The staff is about the size of a walking stick but can be lengthened or shortened according to the user's preferences. The appearance and function of the Vril staff differs according to gender, age, etc. Some staves are more potent for destruction; others, for healing. The staves of children are said to be much simpler than those of sages; in those of wives and mothers, the destructive part is removed while the healing aspects are emphasised.

== Literary significance and reception ==
The book was popular in the late 19th century, and for a time the word "Vril" came to be associated with "life-giving elixirs". An example is in the name of Bovril, coined as a blend word of Bovine and Vril. There was a Vril-ya Bazaar held at the Royal Albert Hall in London in March 1891. The same year, a sequel named The Vril Staff: A Romance was published, written by an unknown author using the pseudonym XYZ.

It also had a strong influence on other contemporary authors. When H. G. Wells's novella The Time Machine was published in 1895, The Guardian wrote in its review: "The influence of the author of The Coming Race is still powerful, and no year passes without the appearance of stories which describe the manners and customs of peoples in imaginary worlds, sometimes in the stars above, sometimes in the heart of unknown continents in Australia or at the Pole, and sometimes below the waters under the earth. The latest effort in this class of fiction is The Time Machine, by H. G. Wells."

It has been suggested that Bulwer-Lytton developed his ideas about "Vril" against the background of his long preoccupation with occult natural forces, which were widely discussed at that time, especially in relation to animal magnetism, or later, spiritualism. In his earlier novels Zanoni (1842) and A Strange Story (1862), Bulwer-Lytton had discussed electricity and other "material agents" as the possible natural causes for occult phenomena. In The Coming Race, those ideas are continued in the context of a satirical critique of contemporary philosophical, scientific, and political currents. In a letter to his friend John Forster, Bulwer-Lytton explained his motives:

I did not mean Vril for mesmerism, but for electricity, developed into uses as yet only dimly guessed, and including whatever there may be genuine in mesmerism, which I hold to be a mere branch current of the one great fluid pervading all nature. I am by no means, however, wedded to Vril, if you can suggest anything else to carry out this meaning namely, that the coming race, though akin to us, has nevertheless acquired by hereditary transmission, etc., certain distinctions which make it a different species, and contains powers which we could not attain to through a slow growth of time; so that this race would not amalgamate with, but destroy us. [...] Now, as some bodies are charged with electricity like the torpedo or electric eel, and never can communicate that power to other bodies, so I suppose the existence of a race charged with that electricity and having acquired the art to concentrate and direct it in a word, to be conductors of its lightnings. If you can suggest any other idea of carrying out that idea of a destroying race, I should be glad. Probably even the notion of Vril might be more cleared from mysticism or mesmerism by being simply defined to be electricity and conducted by those staves or rods, omitting all about mesmeric passes, etc.

Bulwer-Lytton has been regarded as an "initiate" or "adept" by esotericists, especially because of his Rosicrucian novel Zanoni (1842). However, there is no historical evidence that suggests that Bulwer-Lytton can be seen as an occultist, or that he was a member of any kind of esoteric association. Instead, it has been shown that Bulwer-Lytton has been "esotericised" since the 1870s. In 1870, the Societas Rosicruciana in Anglia appointed Bulwer-Lytton as its "Grand Patron". Although Bulwer-Lytton complained about this by letter in 1872, the claim was never revoked. Other claims, such as his supposed membership in the German Masonic lodge Zur aufgehenden Morgenröthe, have been proven wrong.

Those claims, as well as the recurrent esoteric topics in Bulwer-Lytton's works, convinced some commentators that the fictionalised Vril was based on a real magical force. Helena Blavatsky, the founder of theosophy, endorsed this view in her book Isis Unveiled (1877) and again in The Secret Doctrine (1888). In Blavatsky's writing, the Vril power and its attainment by a superhuman elite are worked into a mystical doctrine of race. However, the character of the subterranean people was transformed. Instead of potential conquerors, they were benevolent (if mysterious) spiritual guides. Blavatsky's recurrent homage to Bulwer-Lytton and the Vril force has exerted a lasting influence on other esoteric authors.

When William Scott-Elliot, a British theosophist, described life in Atlantis in The Story of Atlantis & The Lost Lemuria (first ed.), 1896, he mentioned Atlantean aircraft propelled by Vril-force. His books are still published by the Theosophical Society. Scott-Elliot's description of Atlantean aircraft has been identified as an early inspiration for authors who have related the Vril force to UFOs after the Second World War.

The Irish playwright George Bernard Shaw read the book and was attracted to the idea of Vril, according to Michael Holroyd's biography of him.

The French writer Jules Lermina included a Vril-powered flying machine in his 1910 novel L'Effrayante Aventure (Panic in Paris).

David Bowie's 1971 song "Oh! You Pretty Things" makes reference to the novel.

== Stage adaptation ==
A stage adaptation of the book was written by the journalist David Christie Murray and the magician Nevil Maskelyne. The production premiered at Saint George's Hall in London on 2 January 1905. Both Nevil Maskelyne and his father, John Nevil Maskelyne, collaborated on the special effects for the play. The play was unsuccessful and closed after a run of eight weeks.

== Vril Society ==
=== Willy Ley ===
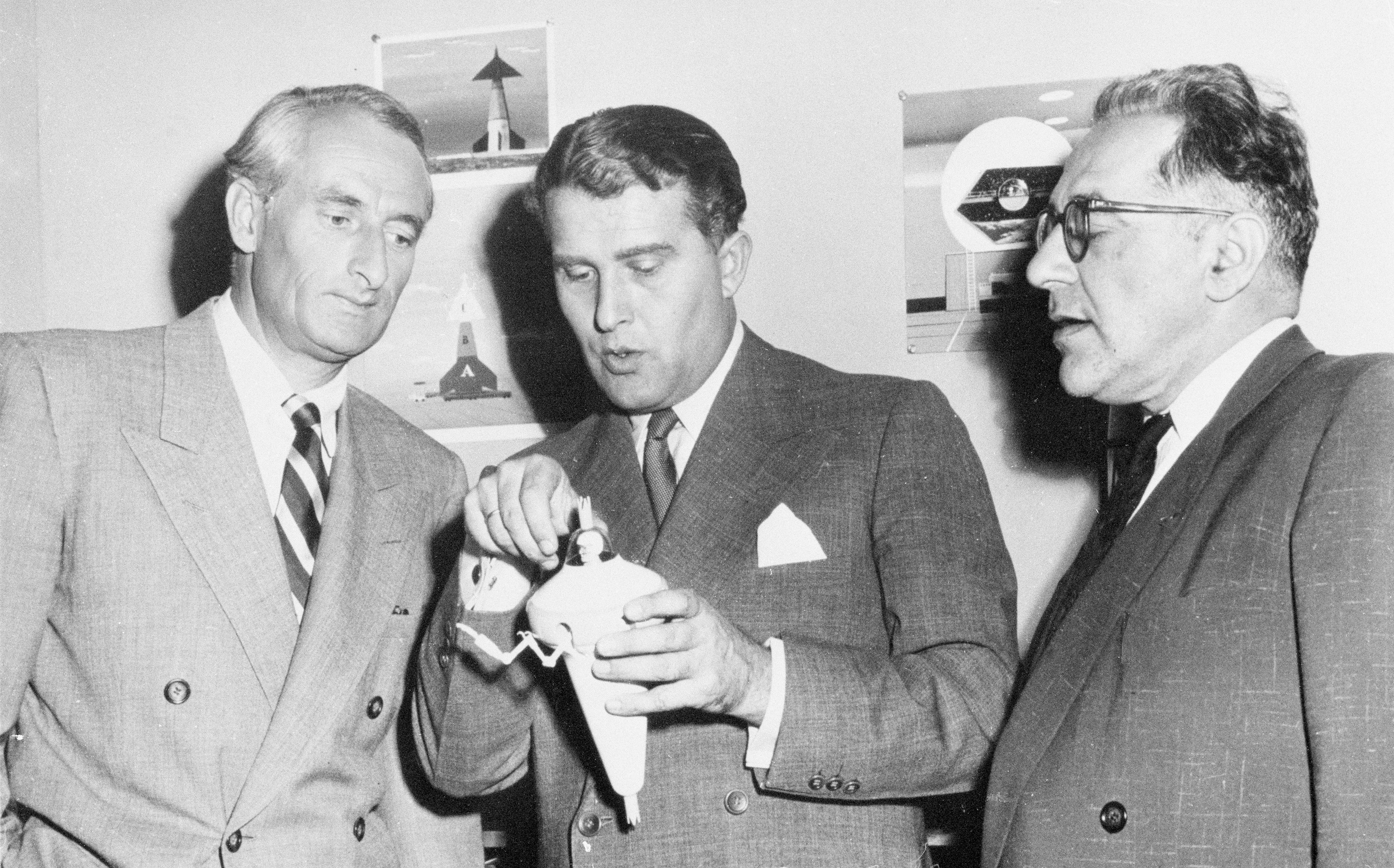
Willy Ley (right) in a discussion with Heinz Haber (left) and Wernher von Braun, 1954

Willy Ley was a German rocket engineer who had emigrated to the United States in 1937. In 1947 he published an article titled "Pseudoscience in Naziland" in the magazine Astounding Science Fiction. He wrote that the high popularity of irrational convictions in Germany at that time explained how Nazism could have fallen on such fertile ground. Among various pseudoscientific groups he mentions one that looked for the Vril: "The next group was literally founded upon a novel. That group which I think called itself 'Wahrheitsgesellschaft' – Society for Truth – and which was more or less localised in Berlin, devoted its spare time looking for Vril."

=== Jacques Bergier and Louis Pauwels ===
The existence of a Vril Society was alleged in 1960 by Jacques Bergier and Louis Pauwels. In their book The Morning of the Magicians, they claimed that the Vril-Society was a secret community of occultists in pre-Nazi Berlin that was a sort of inner circle of the Thule Society. They also thought that it was in close contact with the English group known as the Hermetic Order of the Golden Dawn. The Vril information takes up about a tenth of the volume, the remainder of which details other esoteric speculations, but the authors fail to clearly explain whether this section is fact or fiction. Historians have shown that there has been no actual historical foundation for the claims of Pauwels and Bergier, and that the article of Willy Ley has only been a vague inspiration for their own ideas. Nevertheless, Pauwels and Bergier have influenced a whole new literary genre dealing with the alleged occult influences on Nazis which have often been related to the fictional Vril Society.

In his book Monsieur Gurdjieff, Louis Pauwels claimed that a Vril Society had been founded by General Karl Haushofer, a student of the Russian mystic Georges Gurdjieff.

=== Publications on the Vril Society in German ===
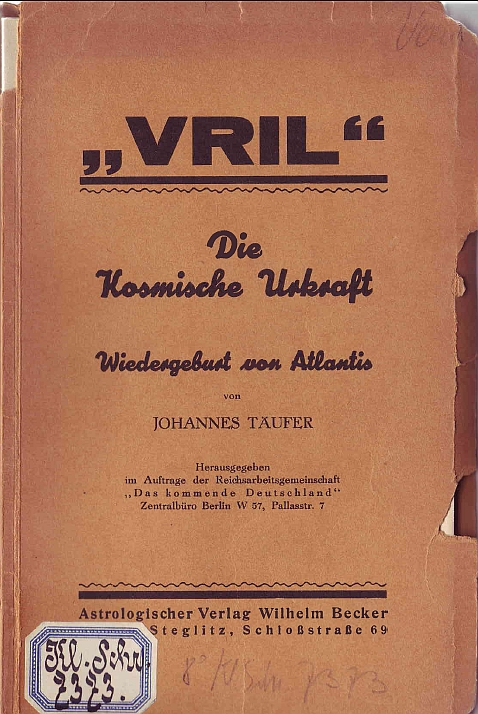
Title page of the Reichsarbeitsgemeinschaft's 1930 pamphlet on Vril

A book by Jacques Bergier and Louis Pauwels was published in German with the title: Aufbruch ins dritte Jahrtausend: von der Zukunft der phantastischen Vernunft (literally Departure into the Third Millennium: The Future of the Fantastic Reason) in 1969.

In his book Black Sun, the historian Nicholas Goodrick-Clarke refers to the research of the German author Peter Bahn. Bahn writes in his 1996 essay, "Das Geheimnis der Vril-Energie" ("The Secret of Vril Energy"), of his discovery of an obscure esoteric group calling itself the "Reichsarbeitsgemeinschaft", which revealed itself in a rare 1930 publication Vril. Die Kosmische Urkraft (Vril, the cosmic elementary power) written by a member of this Berlin-based group, under the pseudonym "Johannes Täufer" (German: "John [the] Baptist"). Published by the influential astrological publisher, Otto Wilhelm Barth (whom Bahn believes was "Täufer"), the 60-page pamphlet says little of the group other than that it was founded in 1925 to study the uses of Vril energy. The German historian Julian Strube has argued that the historical existence of the "Reichsarbeitsgemeinschaft" can be regarded as irrelevant to the post-war invention of the Vril Society, as Pauwels and Bergier have developed their ideas without any knowledge of that actual association. Strube has also shown that the Vril force has been irrelevant to the other members of the "Reichsarbeitsgemeinschaft," who were supporters of the theories of the Austrian inventor Karl Schappeller (1875–1947).

=== Esoteric neo-Nazism ===
After the Second World War, a group referred to by Goodrick-Clarke as the Vienna Circle elaborated an esoteric neo-Nazism that contributed to the circulation of the Vril theme in a new context. In their writings, Vril is associated with Nazi UFOs and the Black Sun concept. Julian Strube wrote that a younger generation related to the Tempelhofgesellschaft has continued the work of the Vienna Circle and exerts a continuous influence on the most common notions of Vril. Those notions are not only popular in neo-Nazi circles but also in films and video games, such as Iron Sky, Wolfenstein and Call of Duty.

== See also ==
- Aether (classical element)
- Aether theories
- Agartha, a legendary kingdom that is said to be located in the Earth's core popular with 19th- and 20th-century occultists theosophists.
- Animal magnetism
- Energy (esotericism)
- Etheric body (spirituality)
- Etheric plane (spirituality)
- Jules Verne
- Kerry Bolton, author of The Nexus
- "The Mound" by H. P. Lovecraft from a short description by Zealia Bishop— underground civilisation fiction apparently clearly inspired by Lytton set in the southwestern U.S.; part of the Cthulhu Mythos
- Mysticism
- Nazism and occultism
- Nazi UFOs
- Odic fluid
- The Phantom Empire— film serial with a similar theme that was perhaps inspired by Lytton and in turn an inspiration on Richard Sharpe Shaver's work
- Prana
- Qi
- Richard Shaver — claimed to know of a civilisation such as that depicted in Vril
- Supermale (1902) by Alfred Jarry (perpetual-motion food)
- Stanislav Szukalski developed theories about Earth being ruled by a race called the Sons of Yeti.
- Us (2019 film) directed by Jordan Peele depicts a race of subterranean machine-like humans designed to copy their counterparts on the surface.
- Wilhelm Reich's Orgone energy
- Southern Television broadcast interruption (Vrillon television hoax)
