= Andrew St. John =

Andrew St. John may refer to:

- Andrew St. John (actor), American actor (b. 1982)
- Andrew St. John (bishop), Australian bishop
- Andrew St John, 21st Baron St John of Bletso, English peer (1918−1978)

== See also ==
- St Andrew St John (disambiguation)
