= John Lawson Johnston =

British businessman (1839-1900)

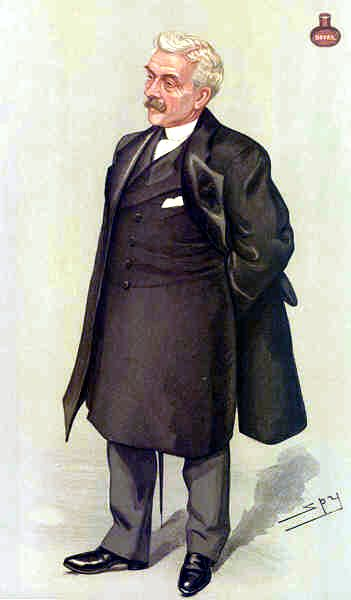
- "Dietetics"; Johnston as caricatured by Spy (Leslie Ward) in Vanity Fair, February 1897
- Born: 1839
- Died: 1900 (aged 60–61)
- Occupation: Entrepreneur

John Lawson Johnston (1839 – 24 November 1900) was a Scottish entrepreneur and the creator of Bovril. He was born in 29 Main Street, Roslin, Midlothian. A memorial plaque is on the property and can be seen above the door. The plaque was put there by the Roslin Heritage Society.

== Life and "Bovril" ==
Johnston studied in Edinburgh. At some point he came into contact with Lyon Playfair, a professor of chemistry at the University of Edinburgh. Through him, John developed an interest in food science and preserving.

Regardless of what his intentions had originally been as a choice of profession, Johnston's uncle John was a butcher and his nephew decided to pursue this as a trade and apprenticed with him. Eventually, he took over his butcher shop in Edinburgh and became well established. While working as a butcher in Edinburgh, he decided to use the large quantity of beef trimmings produced in the butchery process to make his own glace de viande (meat glaze) – beef stock, concentrated by heating until it becomes dark brown and viscous, thus giving it a long shelf-life. This sold so well that he opened a second shop and a factory in the Holyrood area.

In 1871, he emigrated to Canada and set up business in that country. In 1874, the French Army gave him a contract to supply the army with preserved beef products, Britain not having enough beef to supply the French demand in the Franco-Prussian War. While there, he developed Johnston's Fluid Beef (brand Bovril). This was somewhat different from conventional meat glaze in that the gelatin, present in all meat glaze and making it solid at room temperature, was hydrolysed with alkali to make the mixture semi-liquid, and thereby easier to package, measure and use. For his services, he was awarded the Order of the French Red Cross.

He sold his Canadian business in 1880, after his factory burned down, and went to England where he lived at 'Bovril Castle' – Kingswood House, West Dulwich – while he developed the Bovril brand across Britain, based on the commercial promotion of dietetics. In 1889 the Bovril business in Britain was floated on the stock market and became a public company. In 1896 the company received an offer of £2 million from Ernest Terah Hooley and the shareholders agreed to the sale. Lawson Johnston, who was the largest shareholder in the old company, acquired a significant number of shares in a newly formed company and remained on the board until his death in 1900.

He was a keen yachtsman and died aboard his yacht White Ladye in Cannes, France, on 24 November 1900. His body was brought back to England and interred in a large mausoleum in West Norwood Cemetery.

His second son George Lawson Johnston also managed the Bovril company and was raised to the peerage as Baron Luke.
