= George Lawson Johnston, 1st Baron Luke =

British businessman (1873-1943)

The Right Honourable The Lord Luke KBE
- Lord Luke in 1940

Lord Lieutenant of Bedfordshire
- In office 1936–1943
- Monarchs: Edward VIII; George VI
- Preceded by: Samuel Whitbread
- Succeeded by: Dealtry Charles Part

Personal details
- Born: 9 September 1873 Edinburgh, Scotland
- Died: 23 February 1943 (aged 69) London, England
- Spouse: Edith Laura St John (m. 1902; died 1941)
- Children: 6, including Ian
- Education: Dulwich College

George Lawson Johnston, 1st Baron Luke, KBE (9 September 1873 – 23 February 1943), was a British businessman.

== Early life and education ==
Luke was born in Edinburgh, the second son of John Lawson Johnston, a butcher who became a beef stock manufacturer and the founder of Bovril Ltd, and Elizabeth, daughter of George Lawson, a biscuit manufacturer in Edinburgh. He was educated privately in Canada, at Dulwich College, and at Blairlodge School, Polmont (a former Scottish private school).

== Career ==
Johnston worked in Canada, Australia, Africa, and Argentina, and thereby developed expertise in trade and raw materials. He returned from Argentina in 1896 and joined the board of Bovril Ltd, of which he became vice-chairman in 1900 when his father died. He was a Director of the Daily Express from its foundation in 1900 to 1917 and was also a director of Lloyds Bank. During World War I, he was a member of the leather control board and Chairman of Committees in the Raw Materials Department at the War Office.

Apart from his business career, Johnston was also a member of the Bedfordshire County Council and served as a Justice of the Peace, and was High Sheriff of Bedfordshire in 1924. He was particularly noted for his work for hospitals, being honorary Treasurer of the Royal Northern Hospital from 1909 to 1923, chairman of the organizing committee of the Hospitals of London combined appeal in 1922, Honorary Secretary of King Edward's Hospital fund for London, Chairman of the British Charities Association, Treasurer of the County of London Red Cross, and Hon Secretary of the League of Mercy

In the 1929 Dissolution Honours, Johnston was raised to the peerage as Baron Luke, of Pavenham in the County of Bedford. He chose his title partly because St Luke was the patron of hospitals, and partly from the parish of St Luke, Old Street EC1 with which he had a long association. He later served as Lord Lieutenant of Bedfordshire between 1936 and 1943.

== Death ==
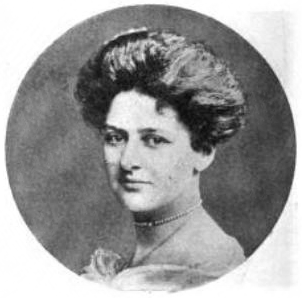
Edith Laura St. John in 1902

Lord Luke died in London on 23 February 1943, aged 69, and was succeeded in the barony by his son Ian.

== Personal life ==
Lawson Johnston married Edith Laura St John (1879–1941) at Melchbourne on 4 December 1902. Edith St John was the daughter of Beauchamp Mowbray St John, 17th Baron St John of Bletso. She was a County Commissioner for the Girl Guides in Bedfordshire and vice-chairman of the City of London Pensions Sub-Committee. They had two sons and four daughters. His daughter Margaret married James Pitman. His second son Hugh was married to Audrey (Pearl) Lawson-Johnston, the last survivor of the sinking of the RMS Lusitania in 1915.

== Arms ==
Coat of arms of George Lawson Johnston, 1st Baron Luke
Crest A spur between two wings Or. Escutcheon Argent on a saltire Sable between four daggers points downwards Gules the sun in his splendour Or on a chief of the third three cushions of the fourth. Supporters Dexter a heron sinister a flamingo both Proper. Motto Nunquam Non Paratus (Never Unprepared)

== Sources ==
- Kidd, Charles, Williamson, David (editors). Debrett's Peerage and Baronetage (1990 edition). New York: St Martin's Press, 1990,
- Leigh Rayment's Peerage Pages

Honorary titles
Preceded by Samuel Whitbread	Lord Lieutenant of Bedfordshire; 1936–1943	Succeeded by Dealtry Charles Part
Peerage of the United Kingdom
New title	Baron Luke; 1929–1943	Succeeded by Ian Johnston
