= William Scott-Elliot =

British theosophist (1849–1919)

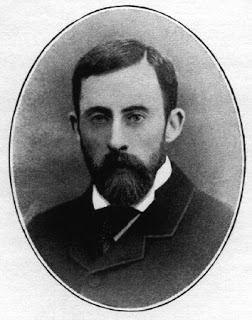
- Born: 24 March 1849; Edinburgh, Scotland, Britain
- Died: 2 September 1919 (aged 70)
- Known for: Theosophist and writer

William Scott-Elliot (sometimes incorrectly spelled Scott-Elliott) (1849–1919) was a Scottish nobleman, merchant banker, theosophist and amateur historian who elaborated Helena Blavatsky's concept of root races in several publications, most notably The Story of Atlantis (1896) and The Lost Lemuria (1904), later combined in 1925 into a single volume called The Story of Atlantis and the Lost Lemuria.

In 1893 he married Matilda (Maude) Louise Travers (1859–1929), daughter of Dr Robert Boyle Travers F.R.C.S., of Farsid Lodge, Rostellan, County Cork, Ireland.

== Theosophical writings ==
Scott-Elliot was an East India Merchant and amateur anthropologist. An early member of the London Lodge of the Theosophical society, in 1893 he wrote The Evolution of Humanity, issued as part of the Transactions of the London Lodge (issue 17).

Scott-Elliot came into contact with theosophist Charles Webster Leadbeater who said he received knowledge about ancient Atlantis and Lemuria from the Theosophical Masters by "astral clairvoyance." Leadbeater transmitted his clairvoyant findings to Scott-Elliot, who undertook scholarly research to back them up. Despite Leadbeater's contributions, Scott-Elliot was listed as the sole author of the resulting book The Story of Atlantis (1896), which was published with a preface by Alfred Percy Sinnett.

In 1899 he was awarded the T. Subba Row Medal for his contributions to "esoteric science and philosophy". In 1904 he added detail on Lemuria in The Lost Lemuria, attempting to use contemporary scientific evidence to back up Leadbeater's claims.

== Atlantean and Lemurian races ==
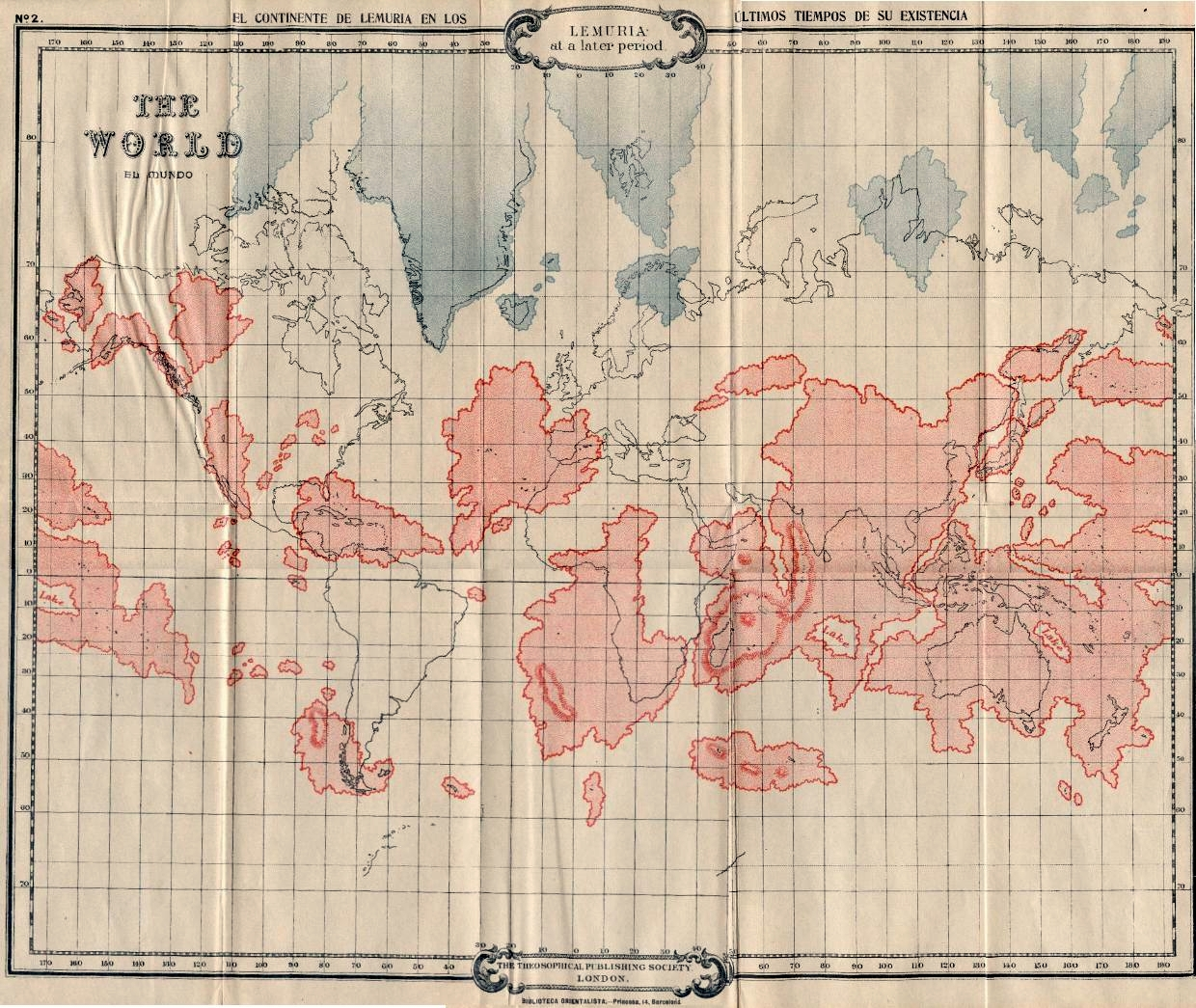
Map of Lemuria superimposed over the modern continents from The Story of Atlantis and Lost Lemuria.

Leadbeater and Scott-Elliot provided much more detail than Blavatsky on the lives of the supposed Atlantean and Lemurian root races. Scott-Elliot located Lemuria in the Pacific Ocean, claiming that it was a gigantic landmass that eventually sank, leaving only small islands. The Lemurians were around fifteen feet tall, with brown skins and flat faces, no foreheads and prominent jaws. They could see sideways like birds, and could walk backwards and forwards with equal ease. They reproduced with eggs, but interbred with animals to produce ape-like human ancestors.

After the demise of Lemuria, new races emerged on Atlantis from the surviving ape-like creatures. This led to the Atlantean races, beginning with the black skinned "Rmoahal" and leading to the "copper coloured" Tlavatli, who were ancestor-worshippers, and then the "Toltecs", who had advanced technology including "airships". The Toltecs were succeeded by "First Turanians" and then "Original Semites". These later produced further sub-races, the Akkadians and Mongolians. A group of Akkadians migrated to Britain 100,000 years ago, where they built Stonehenge. The crudity of the design in contrast to Atlantean architecture is explained by the fact that "the rude simplicity of Stonehenge was intended as a protest against the extravagant ornament and over-decoration of the existing temples in Atlantis, where the debased worship of their own images was being carried on by the inhabitants."

Scott-Elliot also claimed that Atlantis split into two linked islands, one called Daitya, and the other Ruta. Eventually only a remnant of Ruta remained, called Poseidonis, before that too disappeared.

Scott-Elliot's ideas were mentioned by Rudolf Steiner in the essays later published as Atlantis and Lemuria (1904).
