= Beauchamp St John, 17th Baron St John of Bletso =

English peer (1844–1912)

- Born: 4 December 1844; Melchbourne, England
- Died: 10 May 1912 (aged 67)
- Spouse(s): Helen Thornton (m. 1869; died 1909) Ethel Lutley (m. 1911)
- Children: 2+, including Henry, Mowbray and Edith
- Father: St Andrew St John
- Relatives: St Andrew St John (brother); St Andrew St John (grandfather)

Beauchamp Moubray St John, 17th Baron St John of Bletso (4 December 1844 – 10 May 1912) was an English peer.

== Biography ==
St John was born at Melchbourne, the second son of St Andrew St John, 15th Baron St John of Bletso and his wife Eleanor Hussey. He served in the Highland Light Infantry until 1867. He inherited the title Baron St John of Bletso on the death of his brother in 1887 without male heir to become the 17th Baron, and moved to Melchbourne Park, Bedfordshire. He served as Lord Lieutenant of Bedfordshire from 1905 to 1912.

St John married Helen Charlotte Thornton in 1869 and had a very large family. His eldest son Henry succeeded to the title, followed by his second son Mowbray. His daughter Edith married George Lawson Johnston, 1st Baron Luke.

Helen died in 1909 and Beauchamp married, secondly, in 1911, to Ethel Susan Lutley (died 1945), daughter of John H. Lutley of Brockhampton Park, Hereford.

Honorary titles
Preceded by The Earl Cowper	Lord Lieutenant of Bedfordshire; 1905–1912	Succeeded by Samuel Whitbread
Peerage of England
Preceded by St Andrew St John	Baron St John of Bletso; 1887–1912	Succeeded by Henry St John
