= St Andrew St John, 16th Baron St John of Bletso =

English peer

- Born: 5 October 1840
- Died: 2 November 1887 (aged 47); Melchbourne, England
- Spouse: Ellen Senior
- Children: 2
- Father: St Andrew St John
- Relatives: Beauchamp St John (brother)

St Andrew St John, 16th Baron St John of Bletso (5 October 1840 – 2 November 1887) was an English peer.

== Biography ==
St John was the eldest son of St Andrew Beauchamp St John, 15th Baron St John and his wife Eleanor Hussey. He succeeded his father to become the 16th Lord St John, in 1874 and lived at Melchbourne. Politically he was a Conservative.

St John died at Melchbourne at the age of 46 from congestion of the lungs and was buried at Bletsoe. He had no male child and the title passed to his younger brother Beauchamp.

St John married Ellen Georgina Senior, daughter of Edward Senior, a Poor Law Commissioner. They had two daughters, one of whom married Max Townley who was a land agent for later holders of the title and served as MP for Mid Bedfordshire from 1918 to 1922. After the death of her husband, Ellen married Francis Savile Harry Judd of Rickling Essex. She died at Saffron Walden at the age of 49.

Peerage of England
Preceded by St Andrew St John	Baron St John of Bletso; 1874–1887	Succeeded by Beauchamp St John
