= Bovril =

Meat extract (food)

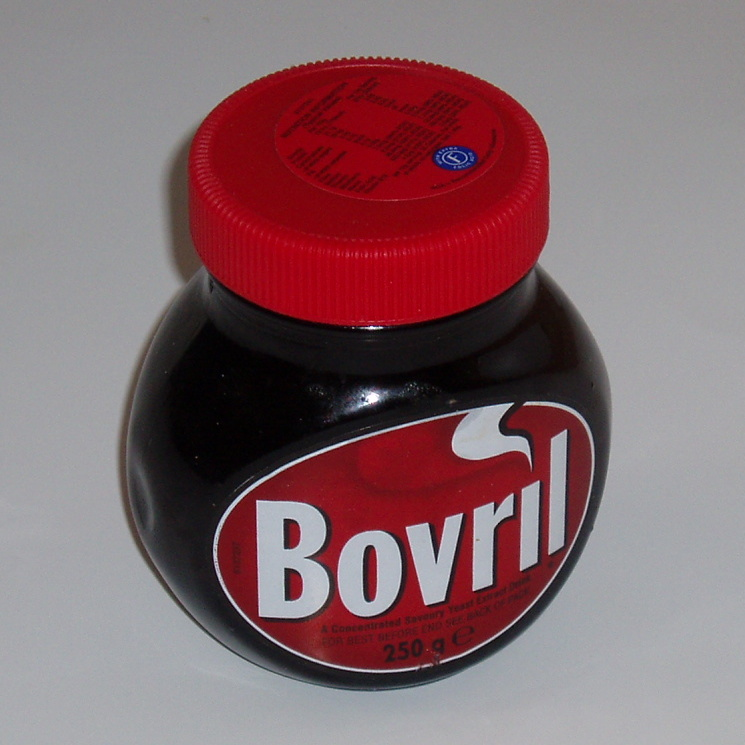
- Bovril (250 g jar)
- Inventor: John Lawson Johnston
- Inception: 1889; 137 years ago
- Manufacturer: Bovril Company
- Current supplier: Unilever

Bovril is a thick and salty meat extract paste, similar to a yeast extract, developed in the 1870s by Scottish entrepreneur John Lawson Johnston. It is sold in a distinctive bulbous jar and as cubes and granules. Its brownish-black appearance is similar to Vegemite and Marmite. Bovril is owned and distributed by Unilever UK.

Bovril is made into a drink by diluting with hot water or, less commonly, with milk. It is used as a flavouring in soups, broth, stews and porridge, and is used as a spread, especially on toast. In 2004 Unilever removed beef ingredients from the Bovril formula, rendering it vegetarian, but in 2006, reversed that decision and reintroduced beef ingredients to the formula.

== Etymology ==
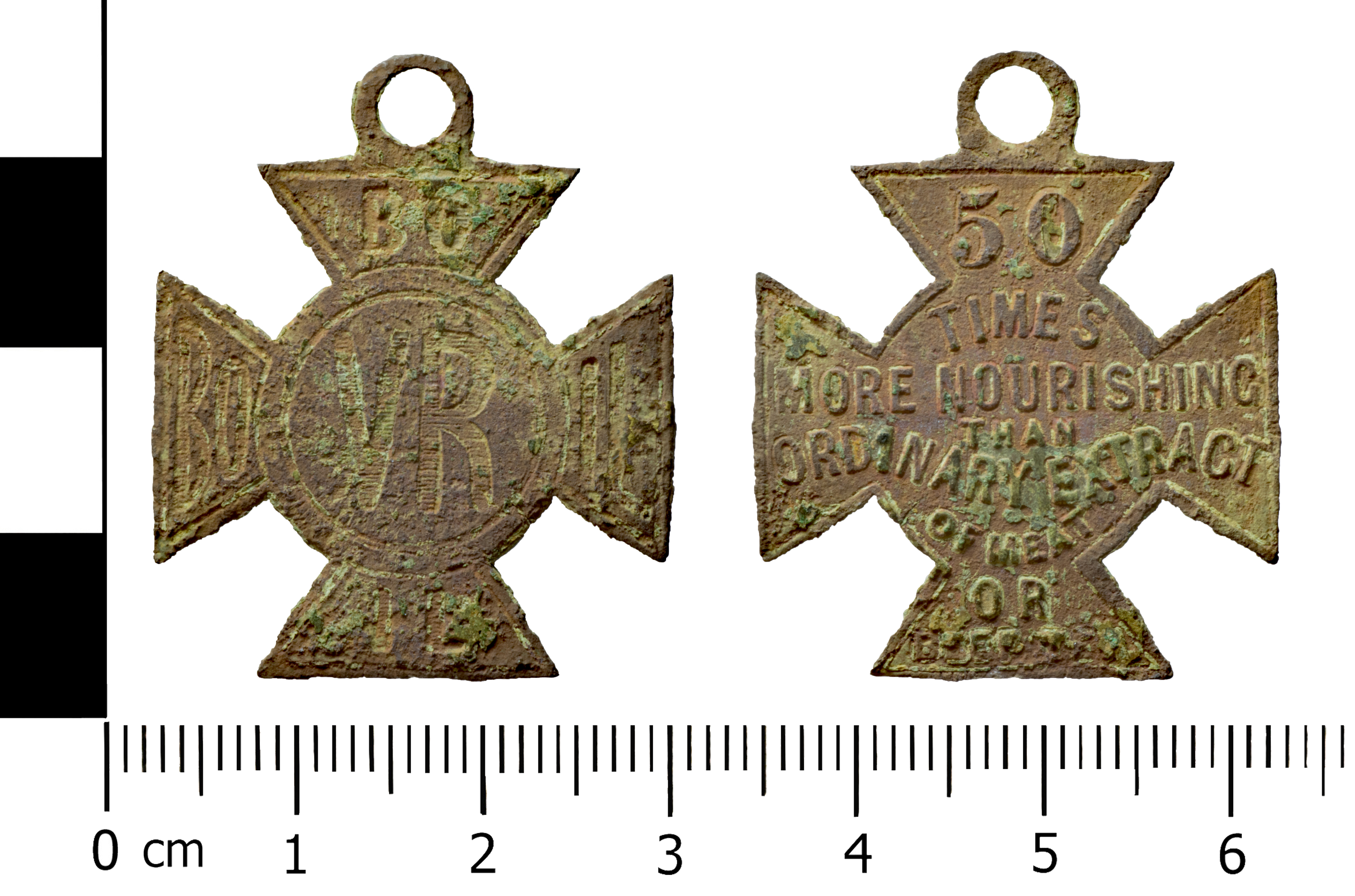
Copper alloy promotional medal or token for Bovril, c. 1866–1914

The first part of the product's name comes from Latin bovīnus, meaning "pertaining to an ox". Johnston took the -vril suffix from Edward Bulwer-Lytton's then-popular novel, The Coming Race (1871), the plot of which revolves around a superior race of people, the Vril-ya, who derive their powers from an electromagnetic substance named "Vril". Therefore, Bovril indicates great strength obtained from an ox.

== History ==
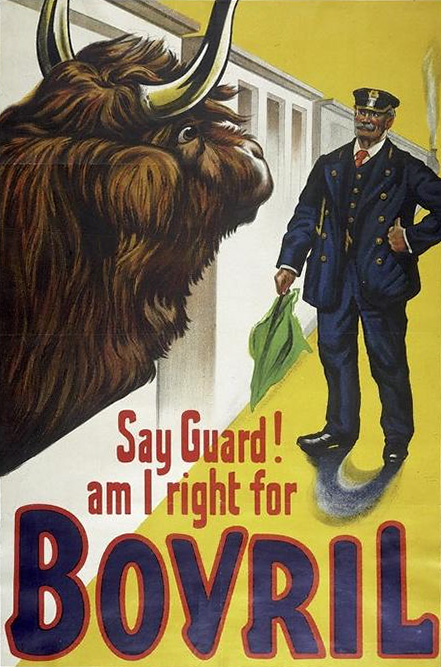
Poster for Bovril, about 1900; V&A Museum no. E.163-1973

In 1870, in the Franco-Prussian War, Napoleon III ordered one million cans of beef to feed his troops. The task of providing this went to John Lawson Johnston, a Scottish butcher living in Canada. Large quantities of beef were available across the British Dominions and South America, but transport and storage were problematic. Therefore, Johnston created a product known as 'Johnston's Fluid Beef', later called Bovril, to meet Napoleon's needs. By 1888, over 3,000 UK public houses, grocers and dispensing chemists were selling Bovril. In 1889, Bovril Ltd was formed to develop Johnston's business further.

The headquarters and factory at 148-166 Old Street in the City of London, designed by H. V. Lanchester and E. A. Rickards. It was demolished in the 1970s.

During the 1900 Siege of Ladysmith in the Second Boer War, a Bovril-like paste was produced from horsemeat within the garrison. Nicknamed Chevril (a portmanteau of cheval, French for horse, and Bovril) it was made by boiling down horse or mule meat to a jelly and serving it as a tea-like mixture. Bovril also produced concentrated, pemmican-like dried beef as part of the British Army emergency field ration during the war. The ration came in the form of a pocket-sized tin can that contained the beef on one half alongside a dried cocoa drink on another half. The dried beef could be eaten alone, or mixed with water to create a beef tea.

Bovril continued to function as a "war food" in World War I and was frequently mentioned in the 1930 account Not So Quiet: Stepdaughters of War by Helen Zenna Smith. It describes the drink being prepared for the casualties at Mons where "the orderlies were just beginning to make Bovril for the wounded, when the bearers and ambulance wagons were shelled as they were bringing the wounded into the hospital".

When John Lawson Johnston died, his son George Lawson Johnston inherited and took over the Bovril business. In 1929, George Lawson Johnston was made Baron Luke, of Pavenham, in the county of Bedford.

Bovril's instant beef stock was launched in 1966 and its "King of Beef" range of instant flavours for stews, casseroles and gravy in 1971. In 1971, James Goldsmith's Cavenham Foods acquired the Bovril Company but then sold most of its dairies and South American operations to finance further takeovers. The brand is now owned by the Anglo-Dutch multinational Unilever, which bought Bovril in 2001.

In 2004, Unilever removed beef ingredients from the Bovril formula, rendering it vegetarian. This was mainly due to concerns about decreasing sales, particularly from exports due to an export ban on British beef, as a result of the growing popularity of vegetarianism, religious dietary requirements, and public concerns about bovine spongiform encephalopathy. In 2006, Unilever reversed that decision and reintroduced beef ingredients to their Bovril formula once sales increased and the beef export bans were lifted. Unilever now produces Bovril using beef extract and a chicken variety using chicken extract.

In November 2020, Forest Green Rovers Football Club announced a collaboration with the makers of Bovril to create a beet-based version of Bovril to be sold at their New Lawn stadium, where meat-based products had been removed from sale some years prior.

== Licensed production ==
In South Africa, Bovril is produced by the Bokomo division of Pioneer Foods.

== Cultural significance ==
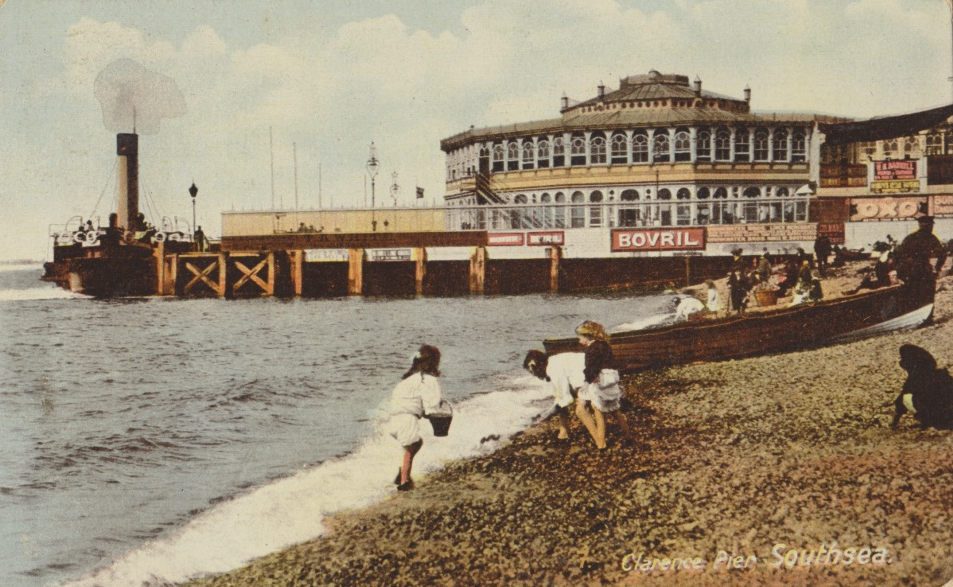
Advertisement for Bovril at Southsea, c. 1914

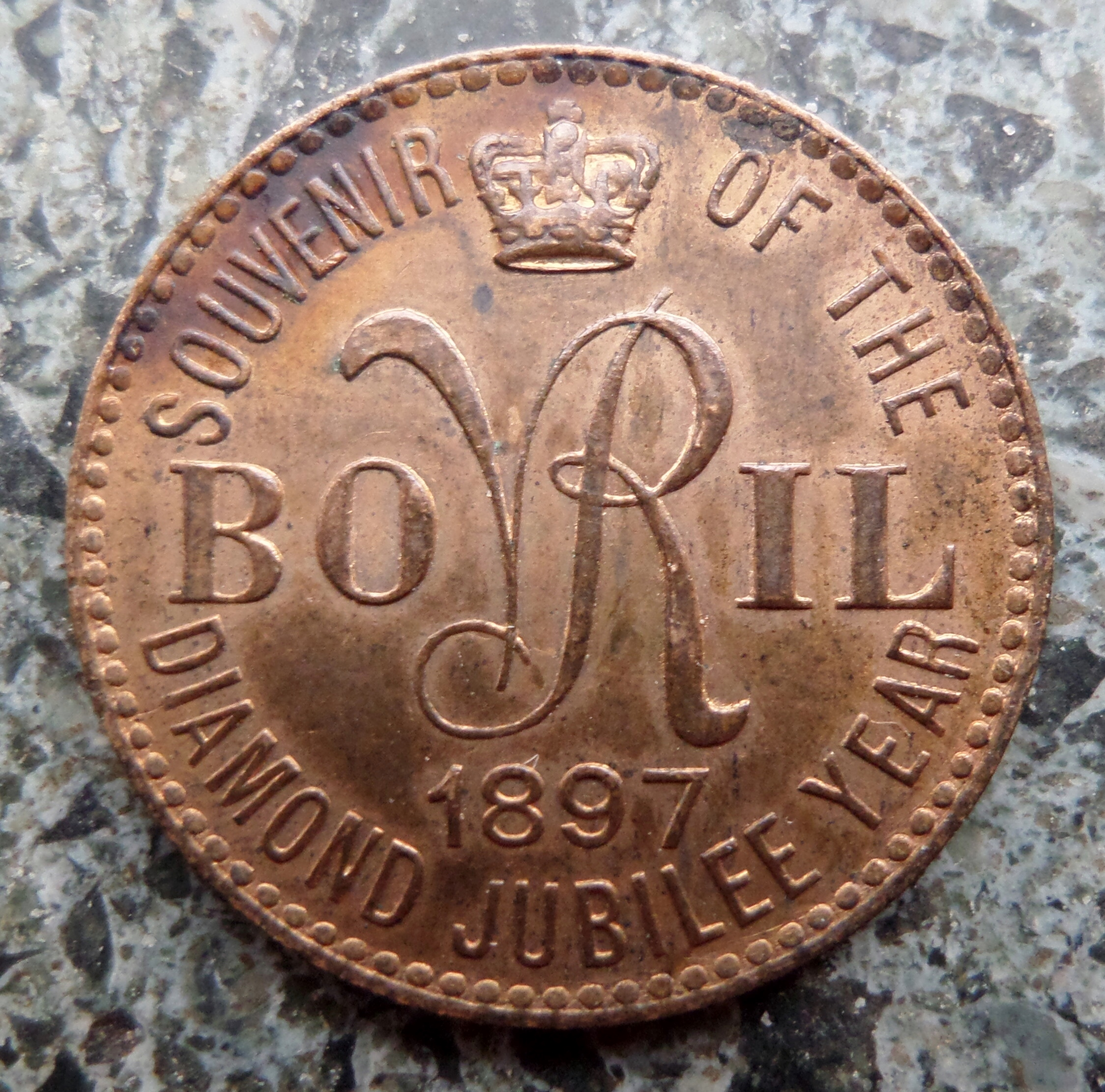
Bovril advertising token issued for the Diamond Jubilee of Queen Victoria

Bovril was promoted as a superfood in the early 20th century. Advertisements recommended people to dilute it into a tea or spread it on their morning toast. Some adverts even claimed that Bovril could protect one from influenza.

Bovril jars are commonly excavated as part of archaeological assemblages, such as at Knowles Mill in Worcestershire.

Since its invention, Bovril has become an icon of British culture. It is associated with football culture. During the winter, British football fans in stadium terraces drink it as a tea from Thermos flasks – or from disposable cups in Scotland, where thermoses are banned from football stadiums.

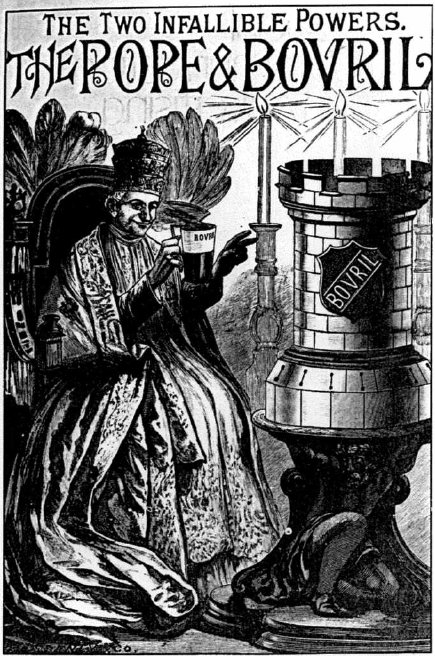
"The Two Infallible Powers: The Pope & Bovril"; poster for Bovril, c. 1900

Bovril holds the unusual distinction of having been advertised with a Pope. An advertising campaign of the early 20th century in Britain depicted Pope Leo XIII seated on his throne, bearing a mug of Bovril. The campaign slogan read: The Two Infallible Powers – The Pope & Bovril.

Bovril beef tea was the only hot drink that Ernest Shackleton's team had when they were marooned on Elephant Island during the 1914–1917 Endurance Expedition.

British mountaineer Chris Bonington appeared in TV commercials for Bovril in the 1970s and 1980s in which he recalled melting snow and ice on the first ascent of Baintha Brakk (known as "The Ogre") to make hot drinks.

== See also ==
- Bonox
- Liebig's Extract of Meat
- Portable soup
- Oxo
- Bovril, Argentina
- Bovril boats
