= St Andrew St John, 15th Baron St John of Bletso =

English nobleman and peer

The Right Honourable The Lord St John of Bletso

Baron St John of Bletso
- In office 1817 – 27 January 1874
- Preceded by: St Andrew St John
- Succeeded by: St Andrew St John

Personal details
- Born: 8 November 1811 Wimpole Street, London, England
- Died: 27 January 1874 (aged 62) Melchbourne, Bedford, Bedfordshire, England
- Resting place: Bletsoe
- Political party: Tory
- Spouse: Eleanor Hussey (m. 1838)
- Children: St Andrew St John, 16th Baron St John of Bletso; Beauchamp Mowbray St John, 17th Baron St John of Bletso; Edmund St John; Eleanor St John; Laura McCausland
- Parent(s): St Andrew St John, 14th Baron St John of Bletso; Louisa Boughton
- Relatives: Alexander Armstrong (great-great-great-grandson)

St Andrew Beauchamp St John, 15th Baron St John of Bletso (8 November 1811 – 27 January 1874) was an English peer.

== Biography ==
St John was born at Wimpole Street the eldest son of St Andrew St John, 14th Baron St John of Bletso, and his wife, Louisa Boughton, daughter of Sir Charles William Rouse-Boughton, 9th Baronet. He succeeded his father in 1817 to become the 15th Lord St John at the age of six. He was educated at Harrow School and was admitted at Trinity College, Cambridge on 10 March 1829. He lived at Melchbourne Park and politically was a Tory, unlike his father.

St John married Eleanor Hussey, daughter of Vice-Admiral Sir Richard Hussey on 12 March 1838. In addition to his sons St Andrew and Beauchamp, who succeeded successively to the barony, he had a third son, Edmund, and two daughters, Eleanor and Laura (12 June 1842 – 21 October 1919), who married Connolly McCausland of Drenagh (13 May 1828 – 25 June 1902) on 8 June 1867, and were the great-great grandparents of comedian, actor and TV presenter Alexander Armstrong.

St John died aged 62 at Melchbourne, and was buried at Bletsoe. He was succeeded in the title successively by his sons St Andrew and Beauchamp.

Peerage of England
| Preceded by St Andrew St John | Baron St John of Bletso; 1817–1874 | Succeeded by St Andrew St John |
