= Golden Grove =

Golden Grove may refer to:

== Places ==
- Golden Grove, Antigua and Barbuda, in St. John's parish
- Golden Grove, Carmarthenshire, Wales, a mansion
  - surrounded by Gelli Aur country park
- Golden Grove, Flintshire, a manor house near Llanasa, Wales.
- Golden Grove, Guyana, a settlement near Nabaclis
- Golden Grove, Jamaica, a village
- Golden Grove, South Australia, a suburb of Adelaide
- Golden Grove, New South Wales, an urban place in Sydney

== Other uses ==
- Golden Grove (ship), three ships
- Golden Grove Mine, a copper, gold, lead, silver, and zinc mine in Western Australia
- Golden Grove, a 1655 devotional work written by Jeremy Taylor while living at Gelli Aur
