= Altham =

Altham may refer to:

- Altham, Lancashire, village and a civil parish in the Hyndburn district of Lancashire, England
  - Altham (ward), an electoral ward
- Altham (car), American automobile manufactured from 1896 to 1899
- HMS Altham, British inshore minesweeper
- Altham (surname)
- Baron Altham, title in the Peerage of Ireland, held by the Annesley family
