= Althamer =

Althamer is a surname. Notable people with the surname include:

- Andreas Althamer (c. 1500 – c. 1539) German humanist
- Paweł Althamer (born 1967, Warsaw) Polish artist and creator

== See also ==
- Altham (surname)
