= Countess of Carbery =

Countess of Carbery is a title given to the wife of the Earl of Carbery. Women who have held the title include:

- Alice Vaughan, Countess of Carbery (1619-1689)
- Frances Vaughan, Countess of Carbery (c.1621-1650)
- Anne Vaughan, Countess of Carbery (1663–1690)
