= Altham (surname) =

Altham is a surname of English origin, based on the placename Altham, Lancashire. The surname emerged at a time when Altham was in the ancient parish of Whalley; Altham is now in the Burrough of Hyndburn. The first form of the surname was likely Elvetham, which was first recorded around 1150 and which persisted into the 12th and 13th centuries. The original form of the surname was based on the Old English name for the placename origin, "river meadow of the swans" hamm elfitu. Evolution of the surname included variants de Eluetham in the 13th century, de Aluetham in the 14th century, Aluetham and Alvetham in the 14th century, with the appearance of Altham in the 14th century.

Prevalence in Great Brintain was about the same in both 1811 and 2011 census data, 373 and 318 instances, respectively. Prevalence in the United States, as of 2003, had not put it in the top 70,000 family names, though Altom was thought to be a potential derivative.

== Notable people sharing this surname ==
- Sir Edward Altham Altham (1856–1943), British Army officer
- Elizabeth Altham (1620–1698), maiden name of Elizabeth Annesley, Countess of Anglesey, an English countess
- Frances Altham (1621–1650), maiden name of Frances Vaughan, Countess of Carbery, an English countess
- Harry Altham (1888–1965), English cricketer
- Sir James Altham (died 1617), English judge
- Jimmy Altham (born 1944), British philosopher
- John Altham (1589–1640), British Jesuit missionary
- Richard Altham (1924–2005), English cricketer
- Robert Altham (John Robert Carr Altham), English judge
- Roger Altham, Archdeacon of Middlesex (1717–1730)
