= Holy Living and Holy Dying =

Collective title of two books by Jeremy Taylor

Holy Living and Holy Dying is the collective title of two books of Christian devotion by the English Anglican cleric Jeremy Taylor. They were originally published as The Rules and Exercises of Holy Living in 1650 and The Rules and Exercises of Holy Dying in 1651. Holy Living is designed to instruct the reader in living a virtuous life, increasing personal piety, and avoiding temptations. Holy Dying is meant to instruct the reader in the "means and instruments" of preparing for a blessed death. Holy Dying was the "artistic climax" of a consolatory death literature tradition that had begun with Ars moriendi in the 15th century.

== Description ==
Holy Living and Holy Dying is the collective title of two books of Christian devotion by Jeremy Taylor, originally published as The Rule and Exercises of Holy Living in 1650 and The Rule and Exercises of Holy Dying in 1651. The two books represent one of the high points of English prose during the period of the early Stuarts. According to historian Nancy Lee Beaty, Holy Dying was the "artistic climax" of a consolatory death literature tradition that had begun with Ars moriendi in the 15th century. Other works in this tradition include The Waye of Dying Well and The Sick Mannes Salve.

Holy Living is designed to instruct the reader in living a virtuous life, increasing personal piety, and avoiding temptations. Holy Dying is meant to instruct the reader in the "means and instruments" of preparing for a blessed death. Each book contains discussions of theology, moral instruction, often prefaced as "The Consideration reduc'd to practise," and model prayers requesting divine assistance in achieving them.

== Morality ==
Holy Living is largely concerned with questions of practical morality, of a type that has hardly changed from the 17th century to today. The companion volume, Holy Dying, was occasioned by the death in 1650 of Frances Vaughan, Countess of Carbery, the wife of Taylor's patron and employer Richard Vaughan, 2nd Earl of Carbery. That book is half Christian instruction and half memorial sermon for Frances, with Taylor displaying his gift for poetic prose. Coupled with the 17th century cult of melancholia, the result is prose that is simultaneously stately and rapturous, "half in love with easeful death", and reads like prose poetry:

But so have I seen a Rose newly springing from the clefts of its hood, and at first it was fair as the Morning, and full with the dew of Heaven, as a Lambs fleece; but when a ruder breath had forced open its virgin modesty, and dismantled its too youthful and unripe retirements, it began to put on a darknesse, and to decline its softnesse, and the symptomes of a sickly age; it bowed the head, and broke its stalk, and at night having lost some of its leaves, and all of its beauty, it fell into the portion of weeds and outworn faces. (See also period (rhetoric)).

== Legacy ==
Taylor's work was much admired by John Wesley, the founder of Methodism, for its devotional quality; and by Samuel Taylor Coleridge, Thomas De Quincey, and Edmund Gosse for its literary qualities. John Osborne said that the book demonstrates how the English language can be used "beautifully and simply".
