= Lament of a dying man =

Anonymous medieval Polish poem

Lament of dying man (Polish: Skarga umierającego) is an anonymous medieval Polish poem dating from the year 1463. The text represents the eschatological literature popular in High Middle Ages and describes torments a sinful moribund has facing his approaching death. His sufferings are the ones ascribed by Ars moriendi to a person on his deathbed. Having confessed his sins, the moribund receives divine consolation and feels ready to call a priest, who would provide him last rites.
