= Golden Grove (ship) =

Several vessels during the Age of sail were named Golden Grove, possibly for Golden Grove, Jamaica, or Golden Grove, Carmarthenshire:

- Golden Grove (1782 ship) was launched in 1780 as Russian Trader, and renamed Golden Grove in 1782. She was a supply ship with the First Fleet transporting convicts to Botany Bay. Thereafter she sailed to the Mediterranean and the Baltic. In 1805 a privateer captured her, but the Royal Navy recaptured her. She is last listed in 1811–1813.
- Golden Grove (1786 ship) was launched at Teignmouth in 1786 as a West Indiaman, and apparently immediately sailed to the West Indies. She first entered Lloyd's Register in 1793 with Tobagonian ownership. She then became a London-based West Indiaman. After 1810 she apparently started sailing between London and Dublin. She was lost c.1821.
- Golden Grove (1793 ship), was launched at Southampton in 1783, but probably under another name. In 1794 she was a slave ship. Under new ownership she wrecked in late 1795. Her loss gave rise to case on insurance still quoted at least some 70 years later.
