= Richard Vaughan, 2nd Earl of Carbery =

Welsh soldier, peer and politician

Richard Vaughan KB PC
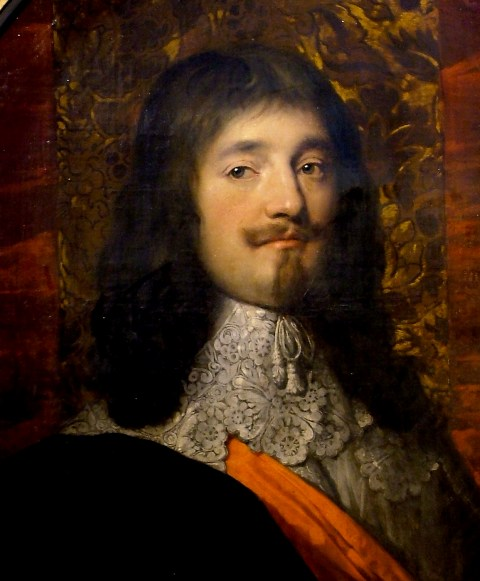

2nd Earl of Carbery
- Reign: 1634–1686
- Predecessor: John Vaughan, 1st Earl of Carbery
- Successor: John Vaughan, 3rd Earl of Carbery
- Born: c. 1600
- Died: 1686
- Buried: Llanfihangel Aberbythych
- Spouses: Bridget Lloyd; Frances Altham; Lady Alice Egerton
- Issue: Francis; John Vaughan, 3rd Earl of Carbery
- Father: John Vaughan, 1st Earl of Carbery
- Mother: Margaret Meyrick

Richard Vaughan, 2nd Earl of Carbery KB, PC (c. 1600 – 1686^{[a]}), styled The Honourable from 1621 to 1628 and then Lord Vaughan until 1634, was a Welsh soldier, peer and politician.

Born the son of a Welsh nobleman with an Irish peerage, Vaughan initially entered the House of Commons as Member of Parliament for the Welsh constituency of Carmarthenshire in 1624. He held the seat until 1629, when King Charles I decided to rule without parliament until 1640. Knighted in 1626, he appears to have had little interest in politics, and after inheriting the estates and titles of his father in 1634, he retired to the life of a country gentleman in South Wales. The outbreak of the English Civil War in 1642 disturbed his peace, and after being courted by both King and Parliament, he declared as a Royalist. He raised troops for the king and took control of the Southern Welsh counties on behalf of the Crown, for which he was rewarded with titles and responsibilities.

Carbery's successes were short-lived however. Never a natural soldier, within a year he was fighting Parliamentarian risings in his counties, and shortly after resigned his command. He saw out the wars in retirement, narrowly escaping a heavy fine from Parliament, and refusing to become involved in any further escapades. Restored to favour after the Restoration in 1660, Carbery received a number of important local positions. He became a literary patron later in his career, hosting the Anglican theologian Jeremy Taylor at his seat, Golden Grove (Gelli Aur), and the poet Samuel Butler, during his time as constable of Ludlow Castle. A scandal involving his treatment of servants forced him to relinquish many of his administrative posts, and he spent his last years in quiet retirement.

== Background ==
Richard Vaughan was the elder of the two sons of John Vaughan, 1st Earl of Carbery, and his first wife Margaret Meyrick, daughter of Sir Gelli Meyrick. In his youth he travelled abroad and went to Madrid in 1622, possibly with his father and the Prince of Wales on the occasion of the ill-fated Spanish Match.

== Early career ==
Vaughan entered the English House of Commons in 1624, sitting for Carmarthenshire, the constituency his father had previously represented, until 1629. On the coronation of King Charles I of England in 1626, he was made a Knight of the Order of the Bath (KB). Vaughan was appointed Custos Rotulorum of Carmarthenshire in 1630, Custos Rotulorum of Pembrokeshire in 1643 and Custos Rotulorum of Cardiganshire a year later, which offices he held until the English Interregnum in 1646.

== English Civil War ==
Vaughan succeeded his father as earl of Carbery in 1634 and joined the Irish House of Lords. Carbery was called to the bar by Gray's Inn in 1637 and did not sit in either the Short or Long Parliaments summoned in 1640. He maintained a low profile in politics, and at the outset of the Civil War, his loyalties were sufficiently ambiguous for him to be courted as a supporter by both King and Parliament. Parliament appointed him lord lieutenant of Carmarthenshire and Cardiganshire in February 1642 and assigned to him the task of executing the militia ordinance in those counties. Carbery instead declared for the king, and he and his uncle, Henry Vaughan, raised a regiment and marched to the support of the king at Oxford in January 1643. As a reward for his loyalty, on 4 April Charles appointed Carbery lieutenant-general of Carmarthenshire, Cardiganshire and Pembrokeshire and sent him to secure the counties for the king. This presented little difficulty in Carmarthenshire and Cardiganshire, as both were royalist leaning, but in Pembrokeshire the seaports of Tenby and Pembroke had active Parliamentarian sympathies. Carbery showed little appetite for a direct confrontation, and after securing an informal truce with the towns, settled down to await developments elsewhere.

By October 1643 Charles had negotiated a peace to end the Irish Rebellion of 1641, and was seeking to transfer his army in Ireland back to England to support his campaigns there. There was also the potential for Irish regiments to also cross to his aid. The Pembrokeshire seaports became of vital strategic importance, and Carbery was instructed to secure them for the king. This he did by rallying the Pembrokeshire gentry for the king and threatening attacks on the towns. Faced with this challenge, Tenby submitted on 30 August, and by 24 October Pembroke had done likewise. Charles rewarded Carbery for his success by creating him Baron Vaughan of Emlyn on 24 October, raising him to the English peerage and entitling him to sit in the English House of Lords. An appointment as governor of Milford Haven followed on 17 November, giving him control over Pembroke and its approaches.

Carbery's moment of victory was short-lived. The Parliamentarian forces in Pembroke rose up under John Poyer, and Carbery was forced to formulate a military response. Lacking any experience or natural aptitude as a soldier, he was limited to calling out his militia and laying siege to Pembroke, hoping to blockade the town into surrender. The Parliamentarian force resisted, at first being relieved by sea, and then launching attacks on the encircling Royalist strongholds, their forces led by Rowland Laugharne. Lacking a mobile reserve force, Carbery could do little to stop them, and soon had lost Tenby, followed by the entirety of Pembrokeshire by March 1644. Carbery was recalled to answer for the disaster, which worsened after his departure as Parliamentarian forces secured Carmarthenshire and Cardiganshire. Although he was exonerated from blame he was required to resign his commission, which was passed to Sir Charles Gerard. Carbery was assigned as Gerard's adviser, and returned to Wales in May 1644, but seems to have retired from any active role in military operations for the rest of the war.

== Later career ==
Carbery faced a heavy fine from Parliament after the war, amounting to £4,500. His former enemy Laugharne was one of those arguing against it on his behalf, stating that he could be a useful supporter of Parliament in the region, if he was conciliated. Carbery went up to Parliament to likewise plead against it and rally support. Sir John Meyrick and the Earl of Essex argued on his behalf, and on 16 February 1646 the House of Commons decided to cancel the fine, a decision formalised and completed by 9 April 1647.

Carbery largely retired into private life, refusing to support the revolt against Parliament in South Wales in April and May 1648, led by his former enemies Laugharne and Poyer, in conjunction with many of the region's Royalists. The rising was crushed and Carbery's decision spared him further molestation from the government. He and his second wife settled quietly in comfortable retirement at the family seat of Golden Grove (Gelli Aur). During this period they played host to the Anglican writer and theologian Jeremy Taylor, who wrote many of his most notable works, including The Great Exemplar and Golden Grove while staying with Carbery.

== Post-restoration ==
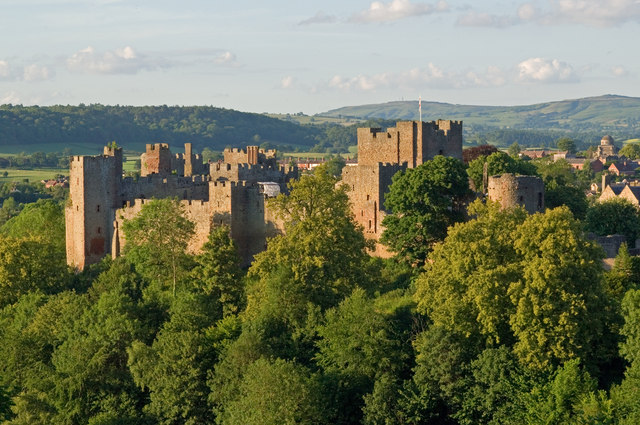
Ludlow Castle, Shropshire, seat of the Council of Wales and the Marches during Carbery's tenure as Lord President of Wales

With the Restoration in 1660, Carbery resumed his first post as custos rotulorum. He was nominated Lord President of Wales and additionally was given several Welsh lord lieutenantcies. In 1661, Carbery was sworn onto the Privy Council of England and in 1670, he became again Custos Rotulorum of Cardiganshire. Carbery was lord president and Lord Lieutenant of Glamorgan until 1672, when after charges of abuse against his servants, Henry Somerset, 1st Duke of Beaufort assumed both offices. A year later the duke succeeded Carbery also as Lord Lieutenant of Anglesey as well as Lord Lieutenant of Brecknockshire. During Carbery's tenure as president, he held the constableship of Ludlow Castle, and appointed his secretary Samuel Butler as the castle's steward. There Butler wrote the first part of Hudibras. Despite the loss of his Lieutenancies, Carbery retained both positions as custos rotulorum until his death in 1686.^{[a]} He was buried at Llanfihangel Aberbythych 12 days later.

== Family ==
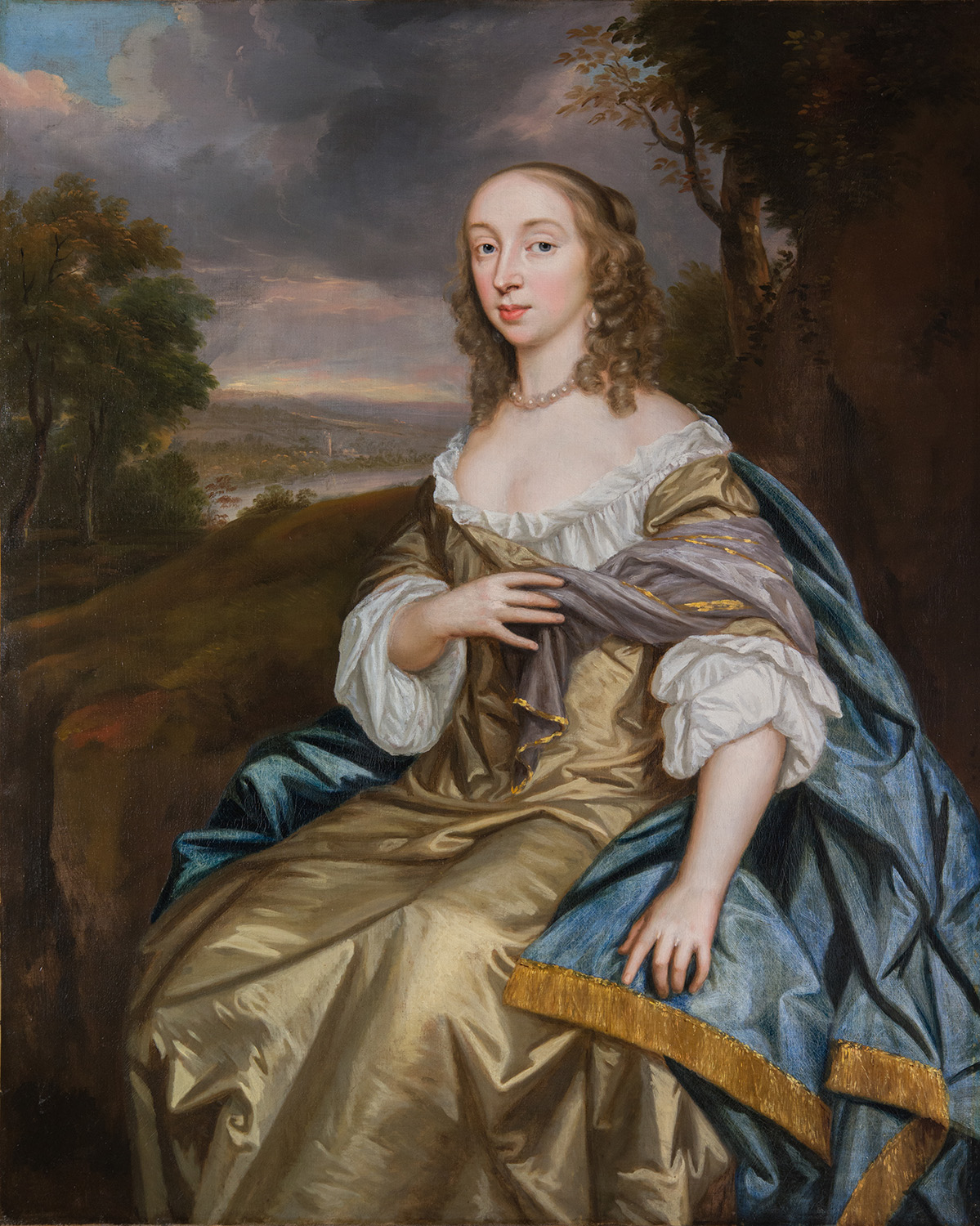
2nd wife: Frances Altham (d. 1650), thought to be by Mary Beale c. 1670 (after a now lost Peter Lely painting)

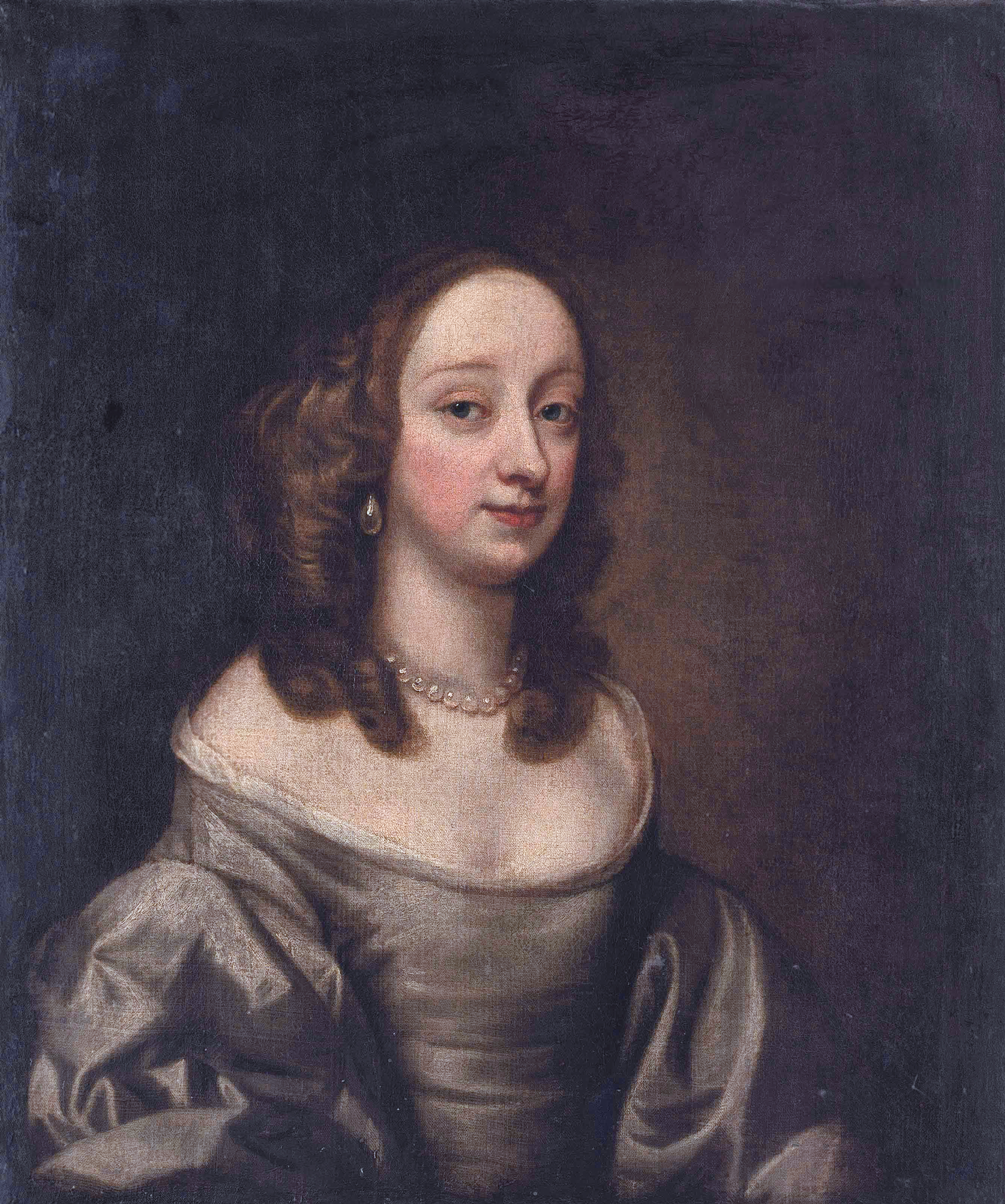
3rd wife: Lady Alice Egerton (1619–1689), circle of John Hayls

Lord Carbery married three times, firstly to Bridget Lloyd, daughter of Thomas Lloyd. After Bridget's death, he married Frances Altham, daughter of Sir James Altham, and granddaughter of the judge Sir James Altham, in Acton, London, on 8 August 1637, and they had three sons (Francis, John and Altham) and a daughter. Frances died in 1650 and Carbery married thirdly Lady Alice Egerton, youngest daughter of John Egerton, 1st Earl of Bridgewater and Frances Egerton, Countess of Bridgewater, two years later.

The earl died in 1686 and was succeeded in his titles by his second son John. His eldest son Francis was the Member of Parliament for Carmarthen when he predeceased his father in 1667. Carbery's last wife, Alice, survived her husband by three years.

== Notes ==
a. The Dictionary of National Biography and its successor, the Oxford Dictionary of National Biography, together with the Dictionary of Welsh Biography, records that Vaughan died on 3 December. The Dictionary of National Biography notes an earlier death date recorded in Narcissus Luttrell's A Brief Historical Relation of State Affairs from September 1678 to April 1714, p. 379. The History of Parliament, using Luttrell's work, records of probate, family papers in the Carmarthen Record Office, and F. Jones's article 'Vaughans of Golden Grove', Transactions of the Honourable Society of Cymmrodorion (1963), p. 128., to prefer a death date of 3 June 1686.

Parliament of England
| Preceded by Sir John Vaughan | Member of Parliament for Carmarthenshire; 1624–1629 | Parliament suspended until 1640 |
Honorary titles
| Preceded by The Earl of Northampton | Custos Rotulorum of Cardiganshire; 1630–1646 | English Interregnum |
| Preceded by The Earl of Pembroke | Custos Rotulorum of Pembrokeshire; 1643–1646 | English Interregnum |
| Preceded by Sir Henry Jones, Bt | Custos Rotulorum of Carmarthenshire; 1644–1646 | English Interregnum |
| English Interregnum | Lord President of Wales; 1660–1672 | Succeeded by The Duke of Beaufort |
| English Interregnum | Lord Lieutenant of Glamorgan; 1660–1672 | Succeeded by The Duke of Beaufort |
| English Interregnum | Lord Lieutenant of Anglesey; 1660–1673 | Succeeded by The Duke of Beaufort |
| English Interregnum | Lord Lieutenant of Brecknockshire; 1660–1673 | Succeeded by The Duke of Beaufort |
| English Interregnum | Custos Rotulorum of Carmarthenshire; 1660–1686 | Succeeded by The 3rd Earl of Carbery |
| Preceded by Lord Vaughan | Custos Rotulorum of Cardiganshire; 1670–1686 | Succeeded by The 3rd Earl of Carbery |
Peerage of Ireland
| Preceded by John Vaughan | Earl of Carbery; 1634–1686 | Succeeded by John Vaughan |
Peerage of England
| New creation | Baron Vaughan; 1643–1686 | Succeeded by John Vaughan |
