= Gelli Aur country park =

Country park in Carmarthenshire, Wales

Coordinates: 51.8596°N 4.0383°W

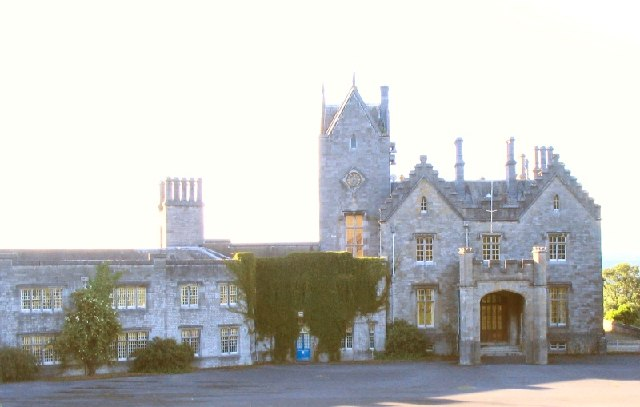
The House at Gelli Aur Country Park, viewed from the Arboretum walk, August 2005.

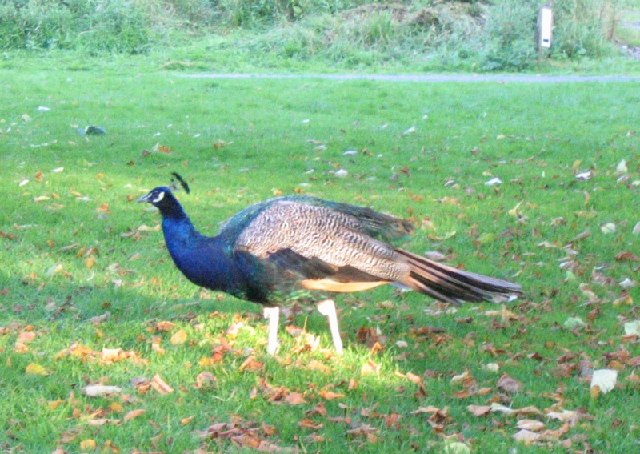
The Park.

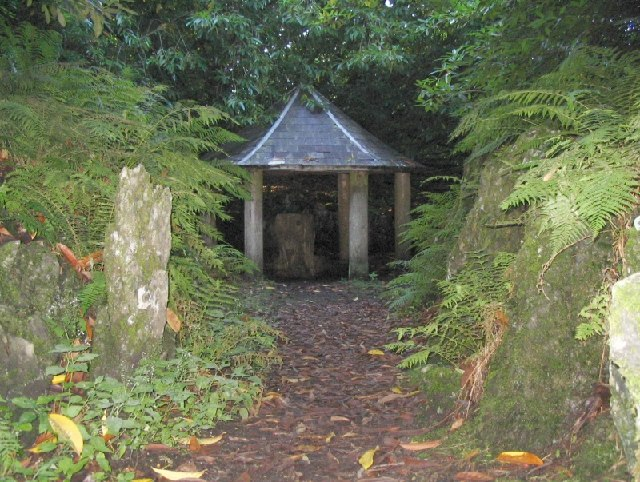
The Grotto.

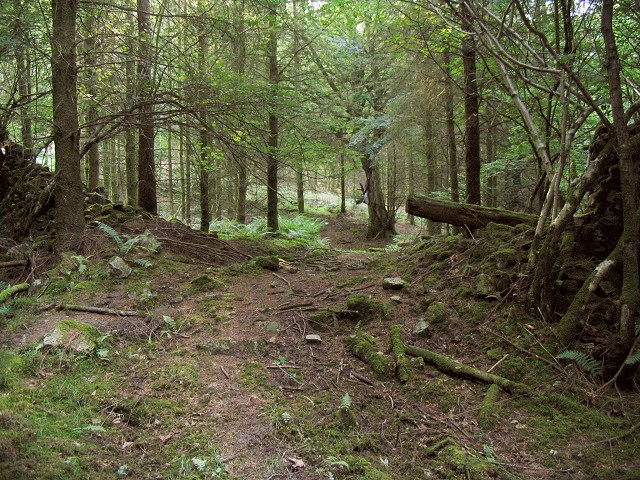
The Forest.

Gelli Aur (meaning: Golden Grove) is a country park in Carmarthenshire, Wales, with 60 acres (240,000 m^{2}) of wooded parkland surrounding Golden Grove mansion. It was once the home of the Vaughan and Cawdor families. The park featured a number of nature trails, a 20-acre (81,000 m^{2}) deer park, a 10-acre (40,000 m^{2}) Aboretum planted in the 1860s. The park was managed for many years by Carmarthenshire County Council. The park is registered (as Golden Grove) at Grade II* on the Cadw/ICOMOS Register of Parks and Gardens of Special Historic Interest in Wales.

The mansion features crow stepped gables, a battlemented portico and tall polygonal chimney stacks. The original Vaughan mansion, built between 1565 and 1570, no longer exists. In 1804 the last of the Vaughans died childless and the Gelli Aur estate passed to the Cawdor family. It was they who built the present mansion between 1827 and 1832. The building was designed by Jeffry Wyatville who had recently worked on the renovations at Windsor Castle. The mansion is now privately owned, and a long programme of restoration is underway.

Since the middle of the 20th century, the house has had a chequered history. During World War Two, it housed American airmen. In more recent times, the big house was leased to Carmarthenshire County Council, and one of the five campuses of Carmarthenshire College (Coleg Sir Gâr) was located there.

In 2015, as part of a ten-year plan to restore the estate, a grant of close to £1 million was arranged with the Welsh Government. The first stage including enabling public access to the parkland and gardens with tea-rooms, a play area, educational activities and trails. The match funding necessary for the third year phase of works did not materialise and therefore the majority of the grant could not be drawn down.
