= Henry Vaughan (Welsh politician, born by 1586) =

Welsh royalist politician

Sir Henry Vaughan the elder (by 1586 – 1660/61?) was a Welsh politician who sat in the House of Commons variously between 1621 and 1644. He was a Royalist leader during the English Civil War.

== Family and early life ==
Vaughan was the sixth son of Walter Vaughan of Golden Grove, and his first wife Mary, daughter of Griffith Rice of Newton, Llandefaisant, Carmarthenshire. His date of birth is unknown, but assuming him to have been at least 21 in 1607, when he is recorded to have been appointed a deputy-coroner, he had been born by at least 1586. He was a younger brother of John Vaughan, 1st Earl of Carbery, and William Vaughan. Henry Vaughan married, at some point between 1609 and 1610, Sage, the daughter and heiress of John Gwyn William of Derwydd, Llandybie in Carmarthenshire, and the widow of Edward Rice of Newton. Vaughan settled at his wife's estates at Derwydd.

== Member of Parliament ==
In 1620, he was High Sheriff of Carmarthenshire. In 1621 he was elected Member of Parliament for Carmarthen, and was returned again in 1624. The 1625 election was a confused affair. Vaughan was returned for the third time for Carmarthen, as witnessed by the mayor and members of the common council. But shortly afterwards another return was made out in favour of Sir Francis Annesley, the Principal Secretary of Ireland. Vaughan was one of those who witnessed Annesley's return, probably indicating that he intended to stand aside on Annesley's behalf. Vaughan's name in the Crown Office list, which had been entered after his initial return, was duly erased on receipt of Annesly's return, but Annesley's name did not replace it. This was presumably because parliament was dissolved before a final judgement could be made. Vaughan was returned without incident at the 1626 election, and again in 1628, sitting until 1629 when King Charles decided to rule without parliament.

== Military service ==
In April 1640, Vaughan was elected MP for Carmarthenshire in the Short Parliament and again in November 1640 for the Long Parliament. From November 1642, Vaughan began raising a regiment in Carmarthenshire to fight for the Royalist cause under his nephew, the Earl of Carbery. He was knighted by the King at Oxford on 14 January 1643, and was disabled from sitting in parliament on 5 February 1644. He was Sergeant-Major-General of the Royalist forces in Pembrokeshire from 1643 until he was defeated at Pill in February 1644 by the Parliamentarian leader, Rowland Laugharne. He established his headquarters at Haverfordwest, but abandoned the town in March 1644, supposedly after a stampede of cattle was mistaken for an attack by Laugharne's troops. Vaughan moved to Carmarthen, but was again forced to move on after this town fell to Parliamentarian forces a few weeks later.

== Imprisonment and later life ==
Vaughan returned to Oxford, and was captured at the Battle of Naseby on 14 June 1645, and brought before the House of Commons on 18 June. From there he was sent to the Tower of London and imprisoned there until 1 October 1647, when he was removed to the Fleet Prison. He was given nominal fines of £160 on 27 April 1644, and then £500 on 20 August 1645 by the Committee for Compounding with Delinquents, after his estate was valued at £600 a year. Vaughan was however in dire financial straits, claiming that he had debts of £3,600, and that the most valuable parts of his estate were part of his wife's inheritance. He remained in prison for some years, being excluded from pardons as part of the Newcastle propositions in 1644, and the general pardon of 13 October 1648, on account of his apparent brutal conduct during the war. Vaughan's fellow prisoner, Sir Francis Wortley, in his "Loyall Song of the Royall Feast kept by the Prisoners in the Towre" (1647), described Vaughan:

Sir Harry Vaughan looks as grave
As any beard can make him,
Those [who] came poore prisoners to see
Do for our Patriarke take him,
Old Harry is a right true blue,
As valiant as Pendraggon,
And would be loyal to his king
Had King Charles ne'er a rag on.

Vaughan was a prisoner allegedly as late as 1659, although he was reported on as a potential Royalist activist in Carmarthenshire in 1658, and had some role in the 1659 elections in Carmarthen. He made his will when living at Derwydd on 27 November 1660 and was dead before a probate inventory of his estate was made on 5 January 1661, prior to proof of his will at Carmarthen on 22 January.

Vaughan had three sons, one of whom was illegitimate, and seven daughters. His eldest son, John, predeceased him and his estates descended to his second son, Sir Henry Vaughan the younger, who was MP for Carmarthenshire for some years after the Restoration.

Parliament of England
Preceded by William Thomas	Member of Parliament for Carmarthen; 1621–1629	Parliament suspended until 1640
Vacant Parliament suspended since 1629	Member of Parliament for Carmarthenshire; 1640–1644	Sir John Lloyd, 1st Baronet
