= Custos Rotulorum of Cardiganshire =

Civic post in Cardinganshire, Wales

This is a list of people who have served as Custos Rotulorum of Cardiganshire.

- Walter Devereux, 1st Viscount Hereford 1543–1558
- John Price 1558 – aft. 1579
- George Devereux c. 1584
- Richard Price 1590 – 1592, 1594 – 1623
- Sir John Lewis bef. 1621–1623
- Sir John Lewis 1623–1626
- William Compton, 1st Earl of Northampton 1626–1630
- Richard Vaughan, 2nd Earl of Carbery 1630–1646
- Interregnum
- Francis Vaughan, Lord Vaughan 1660–1667
- Richard Vaughan, 2nd Earl of Carbery 1670–1686
- John Vaughan, 3rd Earl of Carbery 1686–1713
- Price Devereux, 9th Viscount Hereford 1714
- John Vaughan, 1st Viscount Lisburne 1714–1721
- John Vaughan, 2nd Viscount Lisburne 1721–1741
- vacant
- Thomas Johnes 1743–1780
- Wilmot Vaughan, 1st Earl of Lisburne 1780–1800

For later custodes rotulorum, see Lord Lieutenant of Cardiganshire.
