= Homo unius libri =

Latin phrase meaning "man of one book"

Homo unius libri ('(a) man of one book') is a Latin phrase attributed to Thomas Aquinas by bishop Jeremy Taylor (1613–1667), who claimed that Aquinas is reputed to have employed the phrase "hominem unius libri timeo" ('I fear the man of a single book').

The poet Robert Southey recalled the tradition in which the quotation became embedded:

When St Thomas Aquinas was asked in what manner a man might best become learned, he answered, "By reading one book"; "meaning," says Bishop Taylor, "that an understanding entertained with several objects is intent upon neither, and profits not." The homo unius libri is indeed proverbially formidable to all conversational figurantes. Like your sharp-shooter, he knows his piece perfectly, and is sure of his shot.

The phrase was in origin a dismissal of eclecticism, i.e. the "fear" is of the formidable intellectual opponent who has dedicated himself to and become a master in a single chosen discipline. In this first sense, the phrase was invoked by Methodist founder John Wesley to refer to himself, with "one book" (unius libri) taken to mean the Bible. However, the phrase today most often refers to the interpretation of expressing "fear" of an ignorant person who has "only read a single book".

== Notes ==
- Eugene H. Ehrlich, Amo Amas Amat and More: How to use Latin to Your Own Advantage and the Astonishment of Others, p. 279. "An observation attributed to Aquinas"
