= Custos Rotulorum of Carmarthenshire =

This is a list of people who have served as Custos Rotulorum of Carmarthenshire.

- Richard Devereux 1543 – bef. 1558
- Sir Thomas Jones bef. 1558 – bef. 1559
- Sir Henry Jones bef. 1562–1586
- Sir Thomas Jones 1586 – bef. 1594
- Edward Dunlee bef. 1594–1595
- Sir Thomas Jones 1595–1604
- Sir Henry Jones 1605 – bef. 1637
- Sir Henry Jones, 1st Baronet 1637–1644
- Richard Vaughan, 2nd Earl of Carbery 1644–1646
- Interregnum
- Sir John Lloyd, 1st Baronet Mar–July 1660
- Richard Vaughan, 2nd Earl of Carbery 1660–1686
- John Vaughan, 3rd Earl of Carbery 1686–1713
- Charles Paulet, 3rd Duke of Bolton 1714–1735
- Sir Nicholas Williams, 1st Baronet 1735–1745
- Thomas Williams of Edwinsford (brother of Nicolas Williams, 1st Baronet) 1746–1762
- George Rice 1762–1779

For later custodes rotulorum, see Lord Lieutenant of Carmarthenshire.
