= John Vaughan, 1st Earl of Carbery =

Welsh courtier and politician

John Vaughan, 1st Earl of Carbery (1574 or 1575 – 6 May 1634) was a Welsh courtier and politician who sat in the House of Commons in 1601 and from 1621 to 1622. He served Robert Devereux, 2nd Earl of Essex, and later Prince Charles, heir to the throne of King James I. However, his career ended when the Prince acceded to the throne in 1625, and he later estimated that serving the Prince had cost him £20,000, which went unrecompensed.

== Early life ==
Born to a Carmarthenshire family, Vaughan was the son of Walter Vaughan of Golden Grove, Llandeilo (who died 1597), and his wife Katherine, a daughter of Gruffydd ap Rhys of Dinefwr. His Vaughan grandfather, another John, was the first of the family to settle at Golden Grove and claimed descent from Bleddyn ap Cynfyn (died 1075), a Prince of Gwynedd and of Powys of the Royal House of Mathrafal. Vaughan's father married secondly Letitia, a daughter of Sir John Perrot, Lord Deputy of Ireland.

His brothers included the writer William Vaughan. and the MP Henry Vaughan

Vaughan matriculated from Jesus College, Oxford in 1592 at the age of 17. He became a member of the Inner Temple in 1596. His early career was linked with Robert Devereux, 2nd Earl of Essex – Essex described Vaughan as his "servant" in 1598 and Vaughan married the daughter of Essex's steward in Wales. He followed Essex on his expedition to Ireland in 1599 and was knighted by him. When Essex revolted against Queen Elizabeth, Vaughan's links to Essex meant that he came under suspicion for a time. He represented the constituency of Carmarthenshire in the Parliament of 1601 (and also in the 1621 Parliament), and his reputation was restored. He concentrated on his position in Carmarthenshire in the years following the accession of King James I in 1603. He was appointed High Sheriff of Carmarthenshire for 1605.

== Service with Prince Charles ==
Vaughan worked to obtain a position in the household of Prince Charles, the heir to the throne, and in 1614 asked the Earl of Somerset, who was close to the king, to use his influence. He was successful, gaining the profitable office of comptroller when Prince Charles's household was formed in 1616. He was raised to the Irish peerage as baron of Mullingar whilst Parliament was in recess in 1621, which caused questions to be raised as to whether he was thereby disqualified from sitting as a member of the House of Commons. He did not seek election to Parliament thereafter.

He accompanied Prince Charles in the misadventure of the "Spanish Match", when the prince travelled to Spain in 1623 to seek a marriage with Maria Anna of Spain, the Spanish Infanta, who would become the Holy Roman Empress. However, his fortunes took a turn for the worse. Reports were circulated that he had become a Catholic whilst in Spain, and the mission cost him (he said) between £3,000 and £4,000. Charles succeeded to the throne in 1625, and Vaughan was removed from his position as comptroller without compensation or further appointment. In 1628, he sought reimbursement for his expenses on the expedition to Spain, saying to Sir John Coke that his service with Prince Charles had cost him in all some £20,000. Though in 1628 he was created Earl of Carbery in the Irish Peerage, it is unclear whether this was intended as compensation or whether he had to pay for this advancement.

He remained at Golden Grove, the Vaughan estate in Llanfihangel Aberbythych, Carmarthenshire, Wales and died there in May 1634. He was buried in the family vault in the church of Llandeilo Fawr, Carmarthenshire. He was succeeded by his only surviving son, Richard.

== Marriages and children ==
Vaughan married Margaret, a daughter of Sir Gelly Meyrick, with whom he had issue. Vaughan's father-in-law Sir Gelly Meyrick took part in the Earl of Essex's revolt and was executed for treason on 13 March 1601. Meyrick's daughter Margaret Vaughan and his son Roland Meyrick were restored in blood and name by King James I in 1606. He married secondly to Jane (c.1563 – Nov 1643), daughter of Sir Thomas Palmer of Wingham, Kent, widow and relict of Sir William Meredith, 1st Baronet of Stainsty, county Denbigh, Wales, who by her marriage to Vaughan was styled Countess of Carbery, and who survived him.

Vaughan's surviving children by his first marriage were his eldest son Richard, and his daughter Elizabeth (d. by 1642) who married Sir Henry Salusbury, 1st Baronet.

Vaughan's sister Elinor married John Protheroe of Nantyrhebog, Powys, Wales.

Parliament of England
| Preceded by Walter Vaughan | Member of Parliament for Carmarthenshire; 1601 | Succeeded by Sir Robert Mansell |
| Preceded by Sir Robert Mansell | Member of Parliament for Carmarthenshire; 1621 | Succeeded by Richard Vaughan |
Peerage of Ireland
| New creation | Earl of Carbery; 1628–1634 | Succeeded by Richard Vaughan |
| New creation | Baron Vaughan; 1621–1634 | Succeeded by Richard Vaughan |
