= Jeremy Taylor =

English cleric (1613–1667)

The Right Reverend Jeremy Taylor
- Bishop of Down and Connor
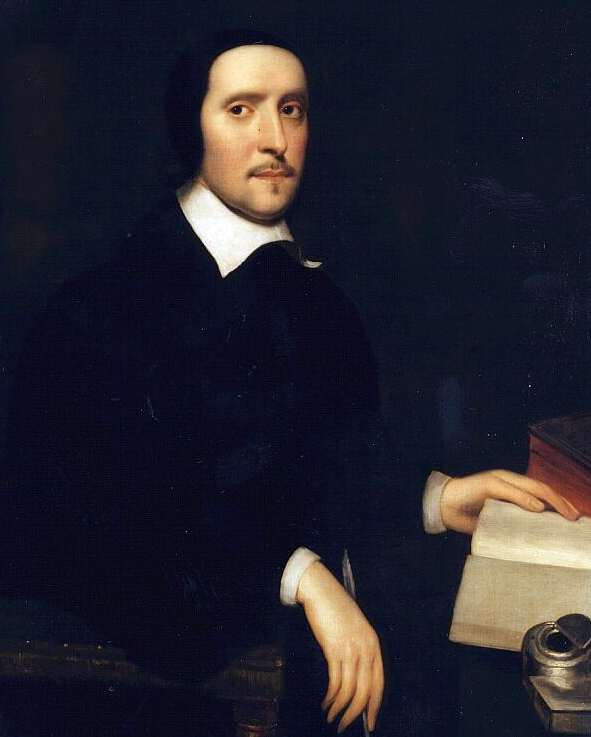
- Taylor in a posthumous portrait by Eden Upton Eddis at Gonville and Caius College, Cambridge
- Church: Church of Ireland
- Diocese: Down and Connor
- In office: 1661–1667
- Predecessor: Henry Leslie
- Successor: Roger Boyle

Orders
- Ordination: 1633
- Consecration: 27 January 1661 by John Bramhall

Personal details
- Born: before 15 August 1613 Cambridge, England
- Died: 13 August 1667 (aged 53–54) Lisburn, British Ireland
- Denomination: Anglicanism
- Education: The Perse School
- Alma mater: Gonville and Caius College, Cambridge

Sainthood
- Feast day: 13 August
- Venerated in: Anglican Communion

Jeremy Taylor (1613–1667) was an English cleric in the Church of England who achieved fame as an author during the Protectorate of Oliver Cromwell. He is sometimes known as the "Shakespeare of Divines" for his poetic style of expression, and he is frequently cited as one of the greatest prose writers in the English language.

Taylor was under the patronage of William Laud, Archbishop of Canterbury. He went on to become chaplain in ordinary to King Charles I as a result of Laud's sponsorship. This made him politically suspect when Laud was tried by Parliament and executed in January 1644/5 during the English Civil War. After the parliamentary victory over the King, he was briefly imprisoned several times.

Eventually, he was allowed to live quietly in Wales, where he became the private chaplain of the Earl of Carbery. After the Restoration, he was made Bishop of Down and Connor in Ireland. He also became Vice-Chancellor of the University of Dublin.

He is remembered in the liturgical calendars of the Church of England and other Anglican churches.

== Early life ==
Taylor was born in Cambridge, the son of a barber, Nathaniel. He was baptized, as a child, on 15 August 1613 at Holy Trinity Church, Cambridge. His father was educated and taught him grammar and mathematics. He was then educated at the Perse School, Cambridge, before joining Gonville and Caius College, Cambridge, where he gained a Bachelor of Arts degree in 1630/1631 and a Master of Arts degree in 1634.

In 1633, although still below the canonical age, he took holy orders, and accepted the invitation of Thomas Risden, a former fellow student, to supply his place for a short time as lecturer at St Paul's Cathedral.

== Career under Laud ==
Archbishop William Laud sent for Taylor to preach in his presence at Lambeth, and took the young man under his wing. Taylor did not vacate his fellowship at Cambridge before 1636, but he spent, apparently, much of his time in London, for Laud desired that his considerable talents should receive better opportunities for study and improvement than the obligations of constant preaching would permit. In November 1635 he had been nominated by Laud to a fellowship at All Souls College, Oxford, where, says Antony Wood, love and admiration still waited on him. He seems, however, to have spent little time there. He became chaplain to his patron the archbishop, and chaplain in ordinary to Charles I.

At Oxford, William Chillingworth was then busy with his magnum opus, The Religion of Protestants, and it is possible that through his discussions with Chillingworth Taylor may have been turned towards the liberal movement of his age. After two years in Oxford, he was presented, in March 1638, by William Juxon, Bishop of London, to the rectory of Uppingham in Rutland. There he settled down to the work of a country priest.

In the next year he married Phoebe Langsdale, by whom he had six children: William (d.1642), George (?), Richard (the last two died c.1656/7), Charles, Phoebe and Mary. In the autumn of the same year he was appointed to preach in St Mary's on the anniversary of the Gunpowder Plot, and apparently used the occasion to clear himself of a suspicion, which, however, haunted him through life, of a secret leaning to the Roman Catholic position. This suspicion seems to have arisen chiefly from his intimacy with Christopher Davenport, better known as Francis a Sancta Clara, a learned Franciscan friar who became chaplain to Queen Henrietta; but it may have been strengthened by his known connection with Laud, as well as by his ascetic habits. More serious consequences followed his attachment to the Royalist cause. As the author of The Sacred Order and Offices of Episcopacy or Episcopacy Asserted against the Arians and Acephali New and Old (1642), he could scarcely hope to retain his parish, which was not, however, sequestered until 1644. Taylor probably accompanied the king to Oxford. In 1643 he was presented to the rectory of Overstone, Northamptonshire, by Charles I. There he would be in close connection with his friend and patron Spencer Compton, 2nd Earl of Northampton.

== Royalist prisoner ==
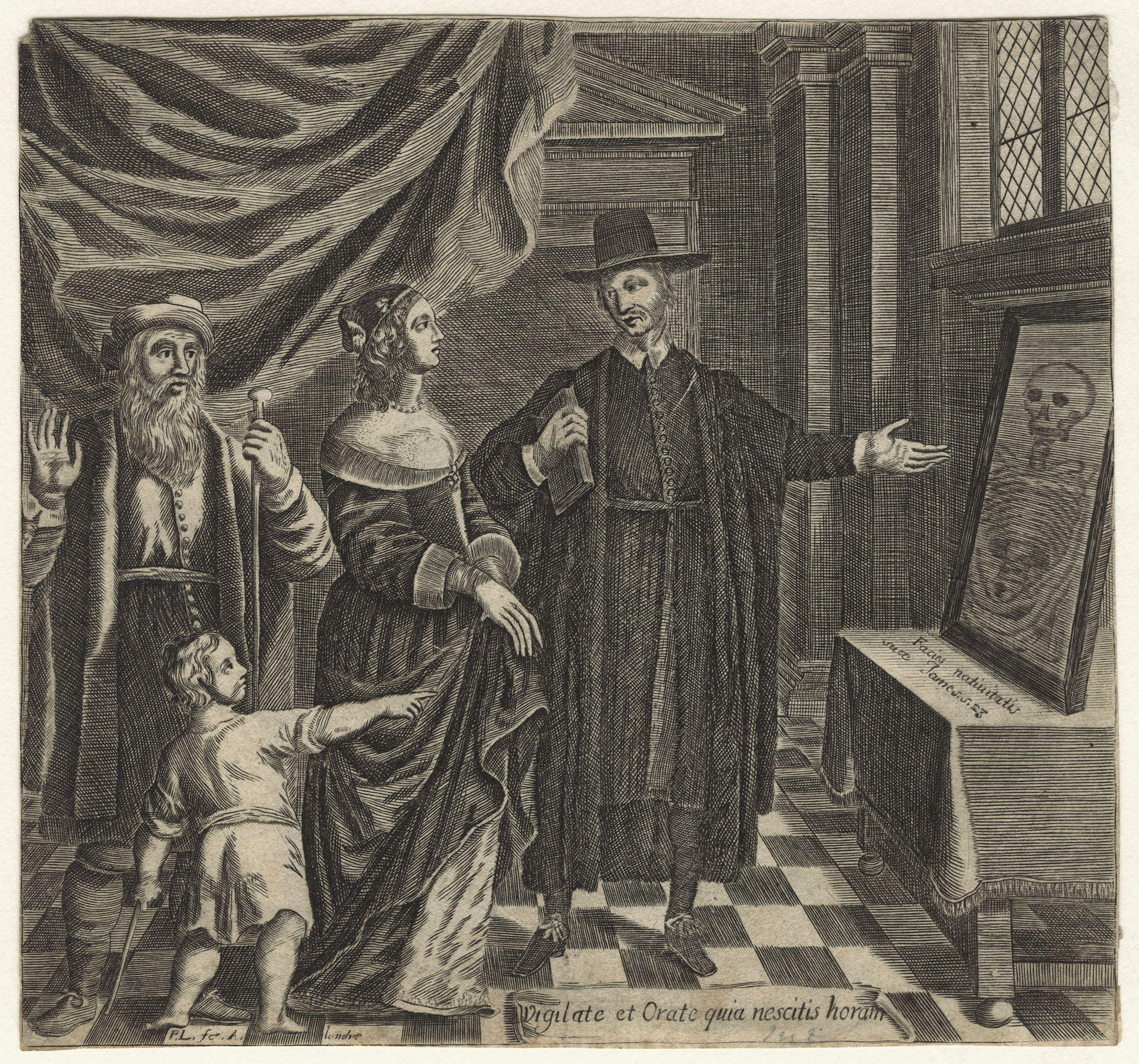
Jeremy Taylor with figures representing youth, maturity and old age by Pierre Lombart (1650)

During the next fifteen years, Taylor's movements are not easily traced. He seems to have been in London during the last weeks of Charles I in 1649, from whom he is said to have received his watch and some jewels which had ornamented the ebony case in which he kept his Bible. He had been taken prisoner with other Royalists in the siege of Cardigan Castle on 4 February 1645. In 1646 he is found in partnership with two other deprived clergymen, keeping a school at Newton Hall, in the parish of Llanfihangel Aberbythych, Carmarthenshire. Here he became private chaplain to and benefited from the hospitality of Richard Vaughan, 2nd Earl of Carbery, whose mansion, Golden Grove, is immortalised in the title of Taylor's still popular manual of devotion, and whose first wife Frances Vaughan, Countess of Carbery was a constant friend of Taylor. At Golden Grove Taylor wrote some of his most distinguished works.

Alice, the third Lady Carbery, was the original of the Lady in John Milton's Comus. Taylor's first wife had died early in 1651. His second wife was Joanna Bridges or Brydges, said to be a natural daughter of Charles I; there is no good evidence for this. She owned a good estate, though probably impoverished by Parliamentarian exactions, at Mandinam, in Carmarthenshire. Several years following their marriage, they moved to Ireland. From time to time Taylor appears in London in the company of his friend John Evelyn, in whose Diary and correspondence his name repeatedly occurs. He was imprisoned three times: in 1645 for an injudicious preface to his Golden Grove; again in Chepstow Castle, from May to October 1655, on what charge does not appear; and a third time in the Tower in 1657, because of the indiscretion of his publisher, Richard Royston, who had decorated his Collection of Offices with a print representing Christ in the attitude of prayer.

== Writings ==
The Rule and Exercises of Holy Living provided a manual of Christian practice, which has retained its place with devout readers. The scope of the work is described on the title page. It deals with the means and instruments of obtaining every virtue, and the remedies against every vice, and considerations serving to the resisting all temptations, together with prayers containing the whole Duty of a Christian. Holy Dying was perhaps even more popular. A very charming piece of work of a lighter kind was inspired by a question from his friend, Katherine Philipps ("the matchless Orinda"), asking How far is a dear and perfect friendship authorised by the principles of Christianity? In answer to this, he dedicated to Mrs Phillipps his Discourse of the Nature, Offices and Measures of Friendship (1657). His Ductor Dubitantium, or the Rule of Conscience … (1660) was intended to be the standard manual of casuistry and ethics for the Christian people. His works were translated into Welsh by Nathanael Jones.

== Bishop in Ireland at the Restoration ==
He probably left Wales in 1657, and his immediate connection with Golden Grove seems to have ceased two years earlier. In 1658, through the kind offices of his friend John Evelyn, Taylor was offered a lectureship in Lisburn, County Antrim, by Edward Conway, 2nd Viscount Conway. At first, he declined a post in which the duty was to be shared with a Presbyterian – or, as he expressed it, "where a Presbyterian and myself [shall be] like Castor and Pollux, the one up the other downe" – and to which a meagre salary was attached. He was, however, induced to take it, and found in his patron's property at Portmore, on Lough Neagh, a congenial retreat.

At the Stuart Restoration, instead of being recalled to England, as he probably expected and certainly desired, he was appointed to the see of Down and Connor, to which was shortly added the additional responsibility for overviewing the adjacent diocese of Dromore. As bishop, he commissioned in 1661 the building of a new cathedral at Dromore for the Dromore diocese. He was also made a member of the privy council of Ireland and, in 1660, Vice-Chancellor of the University of Dublin. None of these positions was a sinecure.

Of the university he wrote:

I found all things in a perfect disorder ... a heap of men and boys, but no body of a college, no one member, either fellow or scholar, having any legal title to his place, but thrust in by tyranny or chance.

Accordingly, he set himself vigorously to the task of framing and enforcing regulations for the admission and conduct of members of the university, and also of establishing lectureships. His episcopal labours were still more arduous. There were, at the date of the Restoration, about seventy Presbyterian ministers in the north of Ireland, and most of these were from the west of Scotland, with a dislike for Episcopacy which distinguished the Covenanting party. No wonder that Taylor, writing to James Butler, 1st Duke of Ormonde shortly after his consecration, should have said, "I perceive myself thrown into a place of torment". His letters perhaps somewhat exaggerate the danger in which he lived, but there is no doubt that his authority was resisted and his overtures rejected.

This was Taylor's golden opportunity to show the wise toleration he had earlier advocated, but the new bishop had nothing to offer the Presbyterian clergy but the alternative of submission to episcopal ordination and jurisdiction or deprivation. Consequently, at his first visitation, he declared thirty-six churches to be vacant; and repossession was secured on his orders. At the same time, many of the gentry were apparently won over by his undoubted sincerity and devotedness as well as by his eloquence. With the Roman Catholic element of the population he was less successful. Not knowing the English language, and firmly attached to their traditional forms of worship, they were nonetheless compelled to attend a service they considered profane, conducted in a language they could not understand.

As Reginald Heber says:

No part of the administration of Ireland by the English crown has been more extraordinary and more unfortunate than the system pursued for the introduction of the Reformed religion. At the instance of the Irish bishops Taylor undertook his last great work, the Dissuasive from Popery (in two parts, 1664 and 1667), but, as he himself seemed partly conscious, he might have more effectually gained his end by adopting the methods of Ussher and William Bedell, and inducing his clergy to acquire the Irish language.

During this period, he was married a second time to Joanna Brydges, supposedly a natural daughter of Charles I. From this marriage, two daughters were born: Mary, who went on to marry Archbishop Francis Marsh and had issue and Joanna, who married Edward Harrison, MP for Lisburn, and had issue. From his father-in-law, Marsh inherited a silver watch, said to have been a gift from Charles I; this watch remained in the family of his great-grandson, Francis Marsh, barrister-at-law.

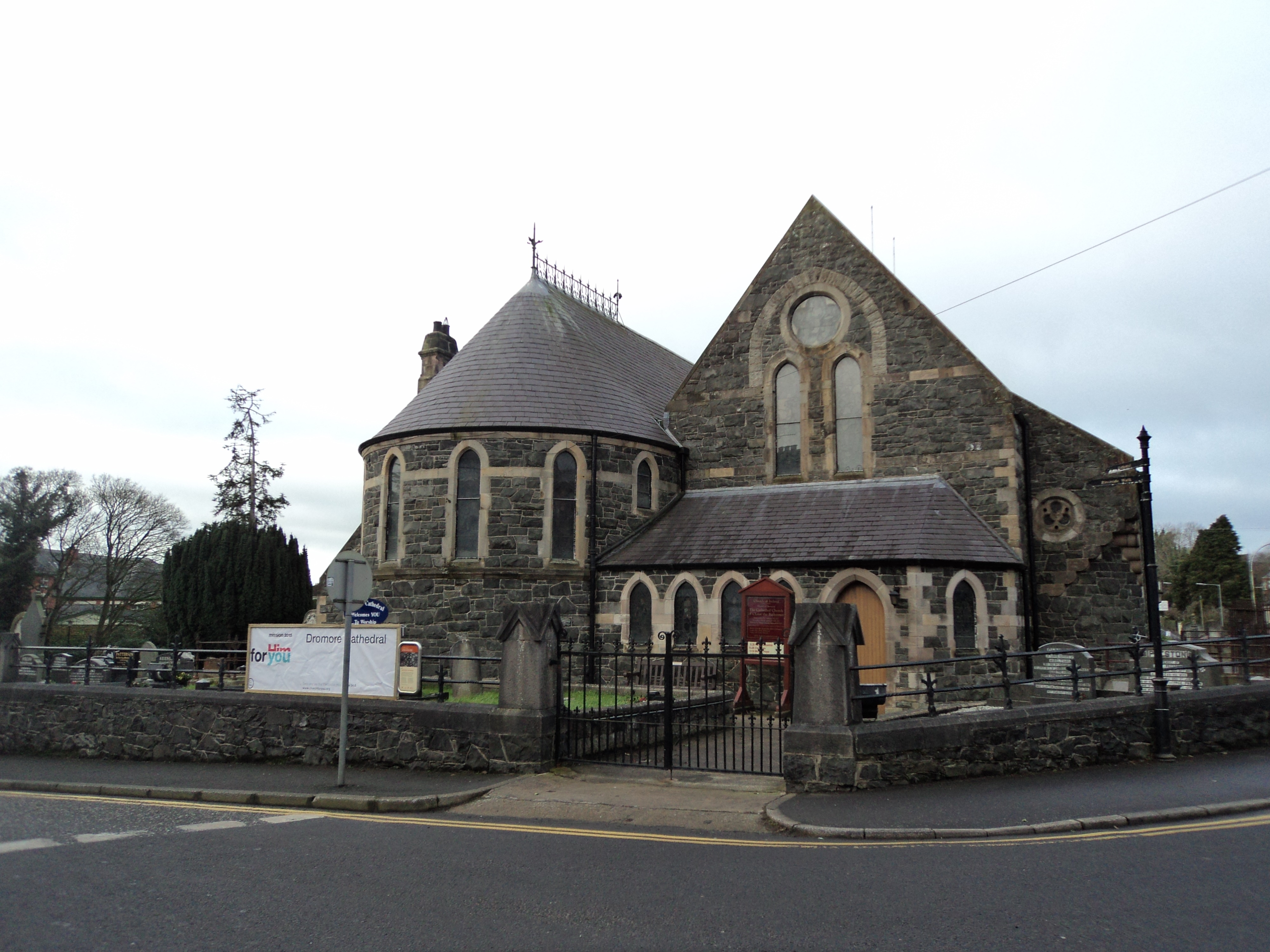
Dromore Cathedral showing the chancel built over the crypt where Taylor was buried

Taylor died at Lisburn on 13 August 1667. He was buried at Dromore Cathedral where an apsidal chancel was built in 1870 over the crypt where he was laid to rest.

Jeremy Taylor is honoured in the Church of England, the Anglican Church of Canada, Scottish Episcopal Church, Anglican Church of Australia and in the Episcopal Church of the United States on 13 August.

== Family ==
Jeremy Taylor is said to have been a lineal descendant of Rowland Taylor, but the assertion has not been proved. Through his daughter, Mary, who married Archbishop Francis Marsh, he had numerous descendants.

== Principal publications ==
- A Discourse of the Liberty of Prophesying (1646), a famous plea for toleration published decades before John Locke's Letters Concerning Toleration.
- Apology for Authorised and Set Forms of Liturgy against the Pretence of the Spirit (1649)
- Great Exemplar … a History of … Jesus Christ (1649), inspired, its author tells us, by his earlier intercourse with the earl of Northampton
- The Rule and Exercises of Holy Living (1650)
- The Rule and Exercises of Holy Dying (1651)
- Twenty-seven Sermons Preached at Golden Grove, for the Summer Half-year … (1651)
- Twenty-five Sermons Preached at Golden Grove, for the Winter Half-year … (1653)
- Clerus Domini: or, A Discourse of the Divine Institution, Necessity, Sacrednesse, and Separation of the Office Ministerial (1651)
- The Real Presence and Spirituall of Christ in the Blessed Statement Proved Against the Doctrine of Transubstantiation. (1654)
- Golden Grove; or a Manuall of Daily Prayers and Letanies … (1655)
- Unum Necessarium (1655), on the doctrine of repentance, perceived Pelagianism gave great offence to Presbyterians.
- Discourse of the Nature, Offices and Measures of Friendship (1657)
- Ductor Dubitantium, or the Rule of Conscience … (1660)
- The Worthy Communicant; or a Discourse of the Nature, Effects, and Blessings consequent to the worthy receiving of the Lords Supper … (1660)

Although Taylor is named as the author on the title page of Contemplations of the State of Man in this Life, and in that which is to Come (1684), the work is an abridgement of Vivian Mullineaux's 1672 English translation of Juan Eusebio Nieremberg's work De la diferencia entre lo temporal y lo eterno, y Crisol de Desengaños (On the Difference between the Temporal and the Eternal, and the Crucible of Deceptions, 1640), apparently compiled by Taylor.

== Secondary literature and posthumous editions ==
- Antoine, Sister Mary Salome. The Rhetoric of Jeremy Taylor's Prose: Ornament of the Sunday Sermons. PhD Dissertation. Washington, D.C.: Catholic University of America Press, 1946.
- Bonney, Henry Kaye. The Life of ... Jeremy Taylor ... Lord Bishop of Down, Connor, and Dromore. London: T. Cadell & W. Davies, 1815.
- Brown, W. J. Jeremy Taylor. London: Society for Promoting Christian Knowledge, 1925.
- Carroll, Thomas K., ed. Jeremy Taylor: Selected Works. Preface by John Booty. The Classics of Western Spirituality Series. New York City: Paulist Press, 1990.
- de Ricci Albrecht, Sister Mary Catherine. The Exemplum in the Sermons of Jeremy Taylor. M.A. dissertation. District of Columbia: Catholic University of America, 1947.
- Duyckinck, George L. The Life of Jeremy Taylor, Bishop of Down, Connor, and Dromore. New York: 1860.
- Gosse, Edmund. Jeremy Taylor. The English Men of Letters Series. London: Macmillan & Co., Ltd., 1904.
- Grosart, A.B., ed. The Poems and Verse Translations of Jeremy Taylor. Fuller Worthies’ Library. 1870.
- Gathorne-Hardy, Robert. A Bibliography of the Writings of Jeremy Taylor to 1700. Dekalb, IL: Northern Illinois University, 1971.
- Heber, Reginald, ed. The Whole Works of the Right Rev. Jeremy Taylor […], with a Life of the Author, and a Critical Examination of His Writings, in Ten Volumes. Revised and corrected by Charles Page Eden. London: Longman, Green, and Longmans, 1848.
- Herndon, S. Jeremy Taylor's Use of the Bible. PhD. dissertation. New York: New York University, 1949.
- Hughes, H. Trevor. The Piety of Jeremy Taylor. London: Macmillan, 1960.
- Huntley, Frank L. Jeremy Taylor and the Great Rebellion: A Study of His Mind and Temper in Controversy. Ann Arbor: University of Michigan Press, 1970.
- Jackson, Robert S. The Meditative Life of Christ: A Study of the Background and Structure of Jeremy Taylor's "The Great Exemplar." PhD. dissertation. Ann Arbor: U of MI, 1959.
- Peterson, Raymond A. The Theology of Jeremy Taylor: An Investigation of the Temper of Caroline Anglicanism. PhD. dissertation. New York: Union Theological Seminary, 1961.
- Stranks, Charles James. The Life and Writings of Jeremy Taylor. London: Church Historical Society, 1952.
- Streatfield, K.M. A Critical Edition of Six Occasional Sermons by Jeremy Taylor (1613–1667). PhD Dissertation. University of Edinburgh, 1988.
- Wheeldon, John. The Life of Bishop Taylor, and the Pure Spirit of his Writings, Extracted and Exhibited for General Benefit. London: George Bigg, 1793.
- Williamson, Hugh Ross. Jeremy Taylor. London: Dennis Dobson Ltd., 1952.
- Worley, G. Jeremy Taylor: A Sketch of His Life & Times, with a Popular Exposition of His Works. London: Longmans, Green, & Co., 1904.

== See also ==
- Caroline Divines
- Homo unius libri
