= Price Devereux, 9th Viscount Hereford =

English Peer

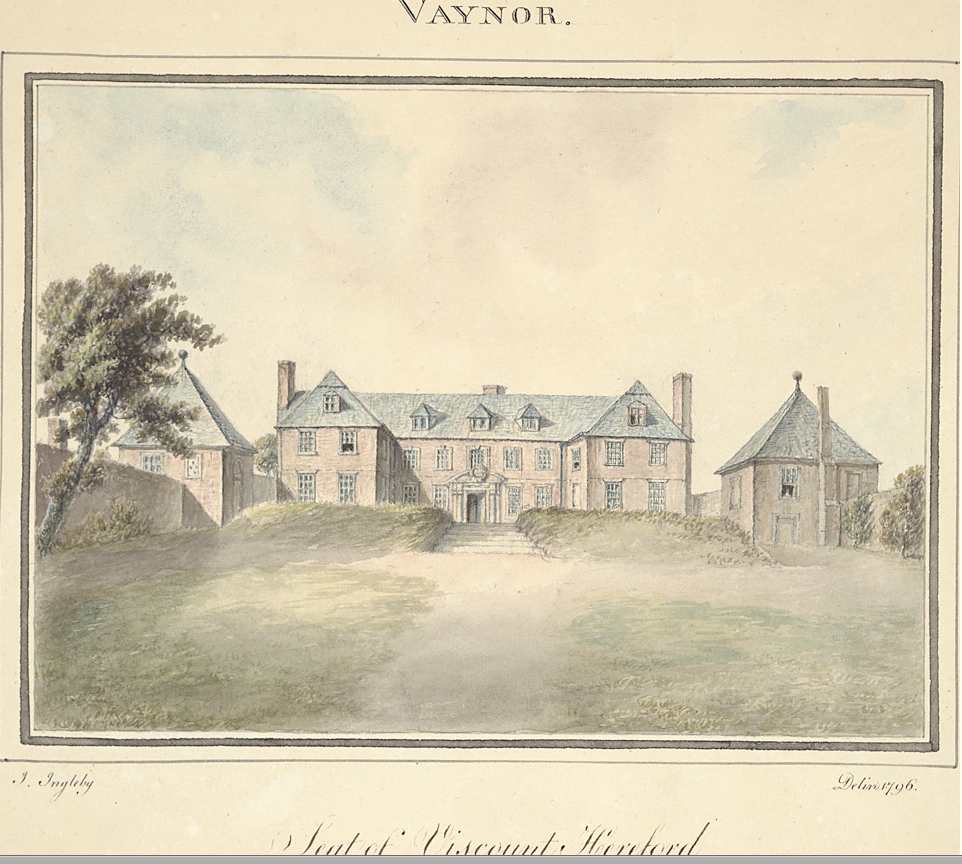
Vaynor Park, Montgomeryshire 1796

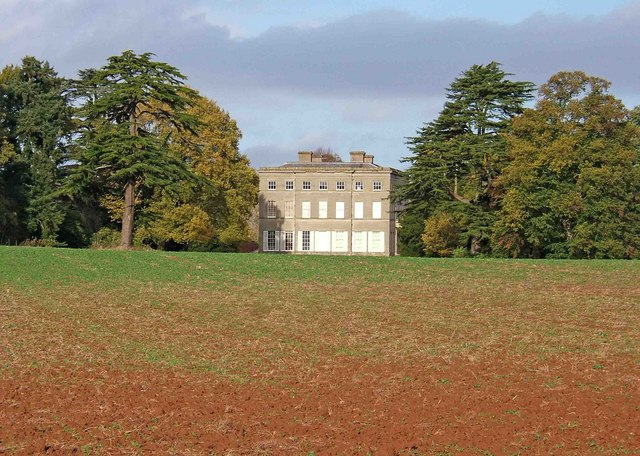
Ombersley Court, Worcestershire

Price Devereux, 9th Viscount Hereford (1664 – 3 October 1740) of Vaynor Park, Montgomeryshire and Ombersley Court, Worcestershire was a British Peer.

He was the son of Price Devereux (who died before his own father in 1666) and grandson of Sir George Devereux, younger brother of Walter Devereux, 5th Viscount Hereford (1578–1658). He succeeded to his grandfather's estate at Vaynor Park in 1682 and to the viscountcy in 1700 when Edward Devereux, 8th Viscount Hereford died without an heir.

He was Member of Parliament for Montgomery from 1691 until his succession in 1700. He was Custos Rotulorum of Montgomeryshire from 1711 to 1714.

He married in 1683 Mary, the daughter of Samuel Sandys of Ombersley Court, Worcester and was succeeded by their only son Price Devereux, 10th Viscount Hereford.

Parliament of England
Preceded by Charles Herbert	Member of Parliament for Montgomery; 1691–1700	Succeeded by John Vaughan
Honorary titles
Preceded by The Earl of Bradford	Custos Rotulorum of Montgomeryshire; 1711–1714	Succeeded by The Earl of Bradford
Preceded by The Earl of Carbery	Custos Rotulorum of Cardiganshire; 1714	Succeeded by The Viscount Lisburne
Peerage of England
Preceded by Edward Devereux	Viscount Hereford; 1700–1740	Succeeded by Price Devereux
Baronetage of England
Preceded by Edward Devereux	Baronet (of Castle Bromwich); 1700–1740	Succeeded by Price Devereux
