= John Vaughan, 3rd Earl of Carbery =

Welsh politician and colonial administrator

The Right Honourable The Earl of Carbery KB FRS
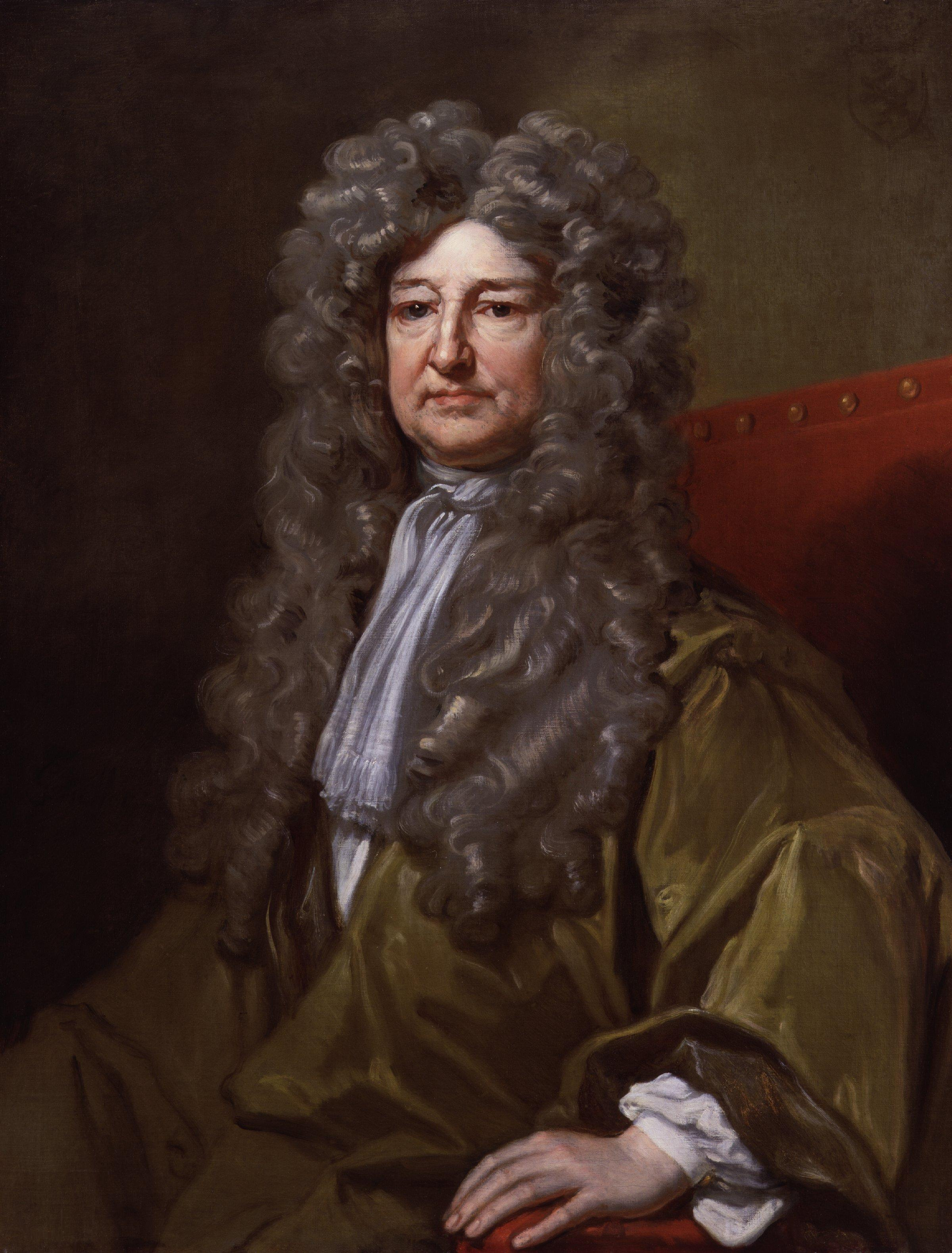

Governor of Jamaica
- In office 1675–1678
- Monarch: Charles II
- Preceded by: Sir Henry Morgan
- Succeeded by: Sir Henry Morgan

7th President of the Royal Society
- In office 1686–1689
- Preceded by: Samuel Pepys
- Succeeded by: Thomas Herbert

Personal details
- Born: 8 July 1639
- Died: 12 January 1713 (aged 73)

John Vaughan, 3rd Earl of Carbery, KB, FRS (1639 – 12 January 1713), styled Lord Vaughan from 1643 to 1686, was a Welsh politician and colonial administrator who served as the governor of Jamaica between 1675 and 1678.

== Life ==
He was the second son of Richard Vaughan, 2nd Earl of Carbery, and his second wife Frances (c.1621 – 9 October 1650), daughter of Sir John Altham of Oxhey, Watford, Hertfordshire. He inherited his title and the Carmarthenshire estate (Golden Grove) in 1686 on the death of his father. His elder brother Francis had already died.

He was invested as a Knight, Order of the Bath (KB) in April 1661. He was Member of Parliament (MP) for Carmarthen between 1661 and 1679 and again for Carmarthenshire between 1679 and 1689. He served as the governor of Jamaica from 1674 to 1678. His deputy was the celebrated privateer and fellow Welshman Sir Henry Morgan. During his tenure as governor, he unsuccessfully tried to defeat the Jamaican Maroons, who were led at the time by Juan de Serras.

He had a reputation for debauchery; Samuel Pepys described him as "the lewdest fellow of the age". Edward Hyde, 1st Earl of Clarendon, whose impeachment Vaughan strongly supported, called him a man who was "as ugly in face as in fame". As governor of Jamaica, he became notorious for corruption, and was even accused of selling his servants into slavery.

He was President of the Royal Society between 1686 and 1689, having been elected a Fellow in 1685. He was Colonel of the Regiment of Foot from 1673 to 1674 and Lord of the Admiralty from 1689 to 1690.

On his death his titles became extinct. His estates passed to a cousin, another John Vaughan (1693–1765), who rebuilt the Golden Grove mansion.

== Family ==
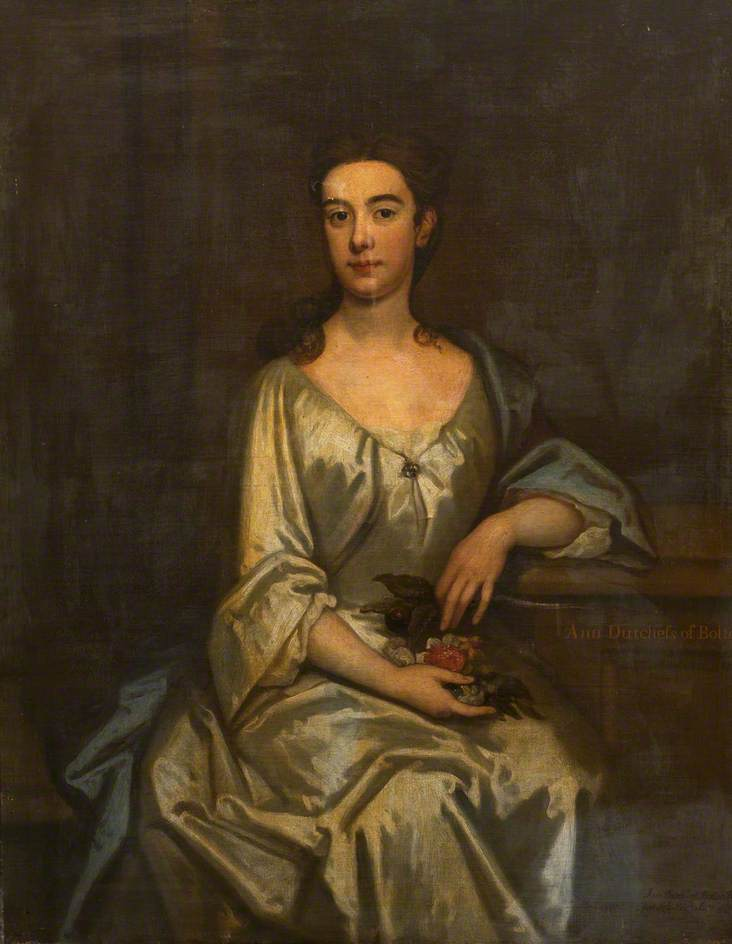
John Vaughan had two children with his second wife, Anne Savile: George and Anne (pictured).

Vaughan married twice, first to Mary Brown, daughter of George Brown of Green Castle; they had no children. He remarried on 10 October 1682 to Anne Savile, daughter of George Savile, 1st Marquess of Halifax and his first wife, Lady Dorothy Spencer. They had two children;

- George Vaughan (b. 6 October 1683, bur. 7 May 1685) died aged 2.
- Anne Vaughan (d. 20 September 1751) who in 1713 married Charles Paulet, 3rd Duke of Bolton

== See also ==
- List of presidents of the Royal Society

== Notes ==
Parliament of England
Preceded by Arthur Annesley	Member of Parliament for Carmarthen; 1661–1679	Succeeded by Altham Vaughan
Preceded by Altham Vaughan	Member of Parliament for Carmarthenshire; 1679–1689	Succeeded by Sir Rice Rudd
Honorary titles
Preceded by The Earl of Carbery	Custos Rotulorum of Cardiganshire; 1686–1713	Succeeded by The Viscount Hereford
Preceded by The Earl of Carbery	Custos Rotulorum of Carmarthenshire; 1686–1713	Succeeded by Marquess of Winchester
Preceded by Sir Edward Mansel	Vice-Admiral of South Wales; 1689–1713	Succeeded by Sir Thomas Mansel
Peerage of Ireland
Preceded by Edward Vaughan	Earl of Carbery; 1686–1713	Extinct
Professional and academic associations
Preceded by Samuel Pepys	7th President of the Royal Society; 1686–1689	Succeeded by Thomas Herbert
