= Earl of Carbery =

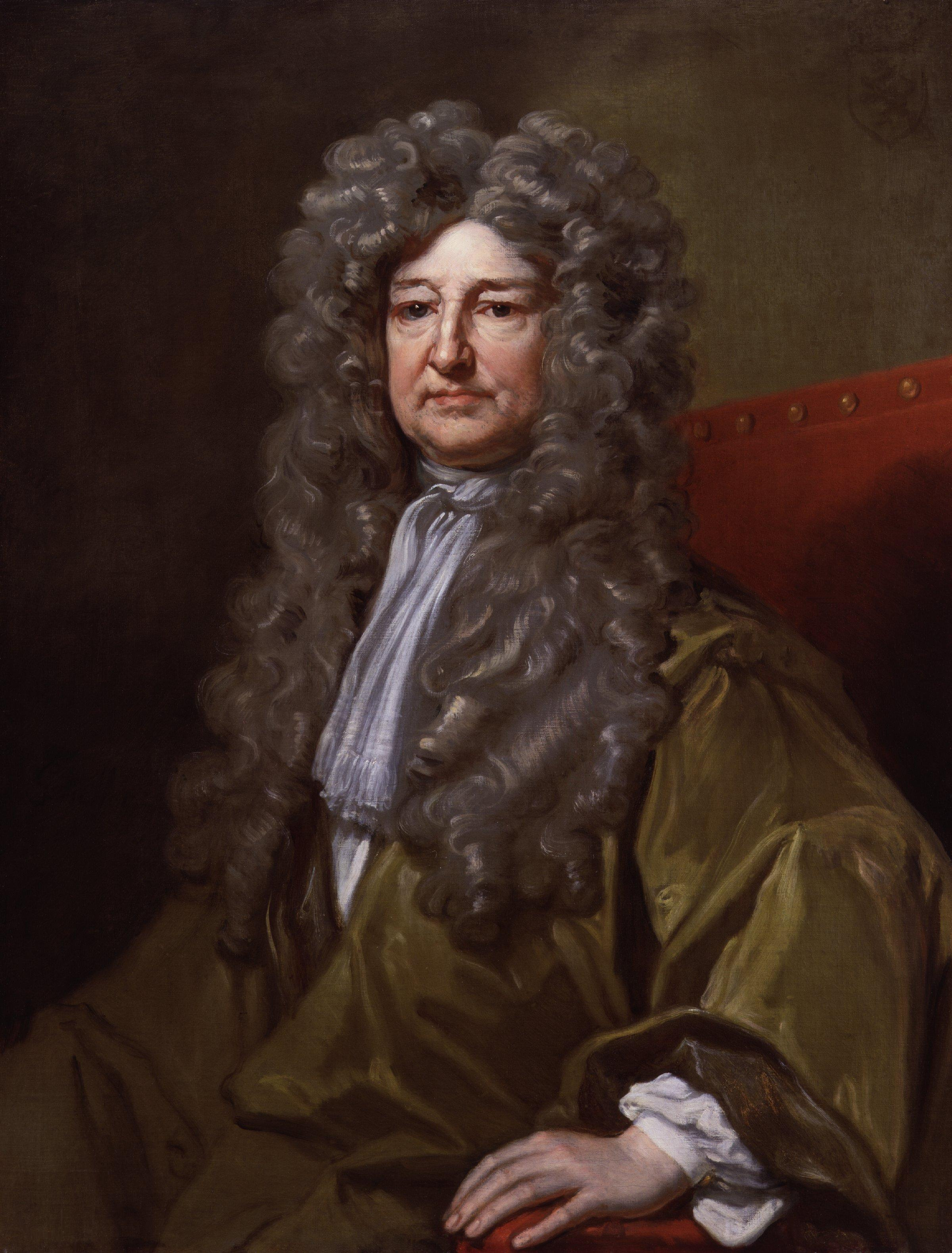
John Vaughan, 3rd Earl of Carbery.

Earl of Carbery, in the County of Cork, was a title in the Peerage of Ireland. It was created on 5 August 1628 for the Welsh courtier and politician John Vaughan, 1st Baron Vaughan. He had already been created Baron Vaughan, of Mullingar in the County of Westmeath, on 13 July 1621, also in the Peerage of Ireland. He was succeeded by his son, Richard, the second Earl. He fought as a Royalist in the English Civil War. On 25 October 1643 Charles I created him Baron Vaughan, of Emlyn in the County of Carmarthen, in the Peerage of England, which entitled him to a seat in the English House of Lords. His eldest son Francis Vaughan, Lord Vaughan sat as Member of Parliament for Carmarthen but predeceased his father. Lord Carbery was therefore succeeded by his second son, John, the third Earl. He notably served as Governor of Jamaica between 1675 and 1678 and as President of the Royal Society between 1686 and 1689. He had no surviving male issue and the titles became extinct on his death in 1713.

William Vaughan and Sir Henry Vaughan, brothers of the first Earl, both gained prominence in their own right. Sir Henry's son and namesake Sir Henry Vaughan was a Knight of the Shire for Carmarthenshire.

The family seat was Golden Grove, Carmarthenshire.

== Earls of Carbery (1628) ==
- John Vaughan, 1st Earl of Carbery (c. 1574–1634)
- Richard Vaughan, 2nd Earl of Carbery (died 1687)
  - Francis Vaughan, Lord Vaughan (before 1639–1667)
- John Vaughan, 3rd Earl of Carbery (1639–1713)
  - Hon. George Vaughan (1683–1685)
