= Altham (ward) =

- Shown within Hyndburn
- Area: 8.33 km^{2} (3.22 sq mi)
- Population: 5,437 (2011)
  - Density: 653/km^{2} (1,690/sq mi)
- District: Hyndburn
- Ceremonial county: Lancashire
- Region: North West
- Country: England
- Sovereign state: United Kingdom
- UK Parliament: Hyndburn
- Councillors: Stephen Button (Labour); Miles Parkinson (Labour)

Altham is one of the 18 electoral wards that form the Parliamentary constituency of Hyndburn, Lancashire, England. The ward returns two councillors to represent the east part of Clayton and Altham village on the Hyndburn Borough Council. As of the May 2019 Council election, Altham had an electorate of 4,088.
