= Ars moriendi =

Two 15th-century Latin texts

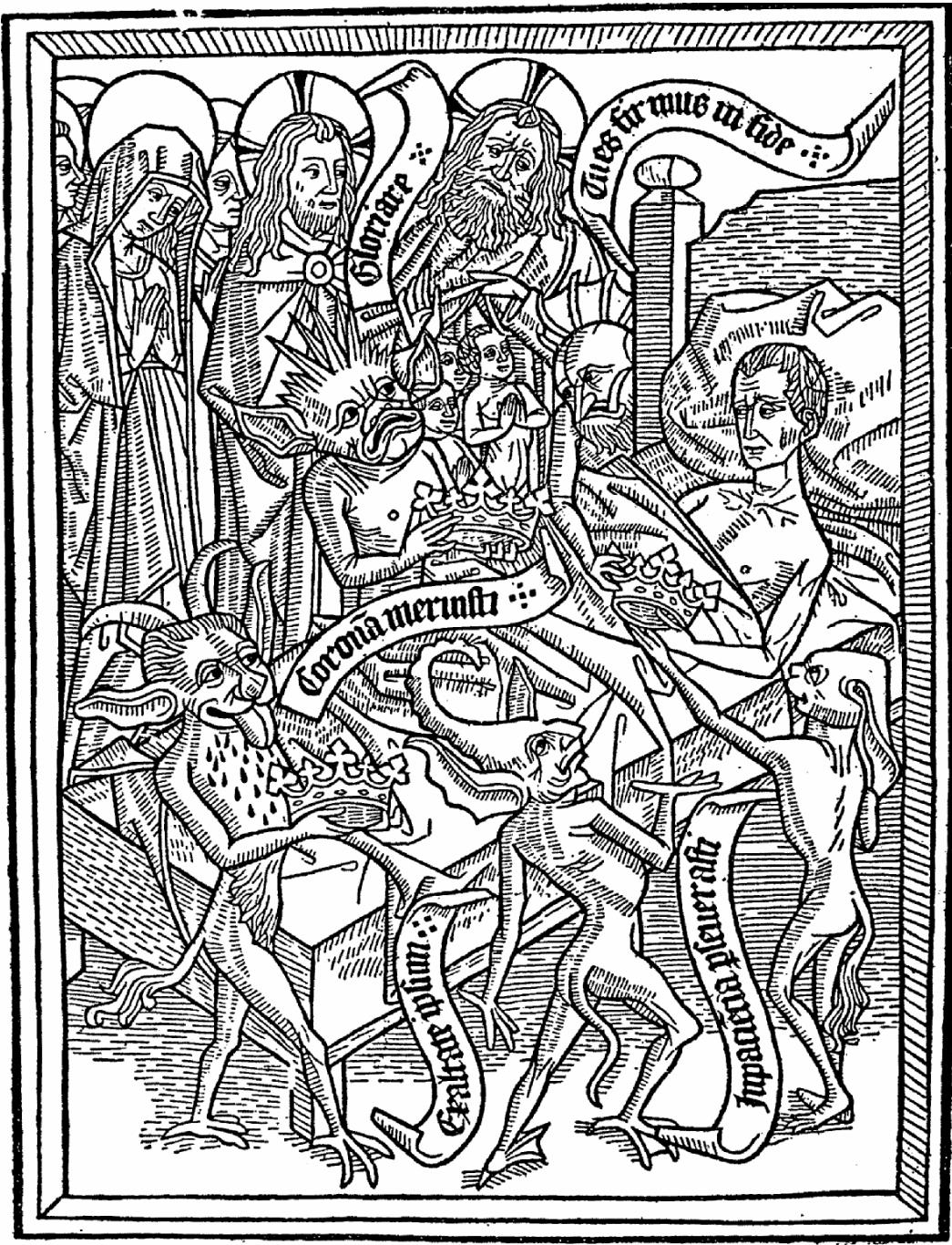
Pride of the spirit is one of the five temptations of the dying man, according to Ars moriendi. Here, demons tempt the dying man with crowns (a medieval allegory to earthly pride) under the disapproving gaze of Mary, Christ and God. Woodblock seven (4a) of eleven, Netherlands, c. 1460.

The Ars moriendi ("The Art of Dying") are two related Latin texts dating from about 1415 and 1450 which offer advice on the protocols and procedures of a good death, explaining how to "die well" according to Christian precepts of the late Middle Ages. It was written within the historical context of the macabre horrors of the Black Death 60 years earlier and consequent social upheavals of the 15th century. The earliest versions were most likely composed in southern Germany. It was very popular, translated into most West European languages, and was the first in a western literary tradition of guides to death and dying. About 50,000 copies were printed in the incunabula period before 1501 and further editions were printed after 1501. Its popularity declined as Erasmus's treatise on preparing for death (de praeparatione ad mortem, 1533) became more popular.

There was originally a "long version" and a later "short version" containing eleven woodcut pictures as instructive images which could be easily explained and memorized. These woodcut images were circulated in both print and individual engravings. They could then easily be pinned to a wall for viewing.

The authors of the two texts are unknown, but assumed to be Dominican churchmen, as they echo Jean de Gerson's publication, the Opusculum Tripartitu, containing a section named De arte Moriendi. Gerson may have been influenced by earlier references in 'compendia of faith' dating back to the thirteenth century, but the content was uniquely his own.

== Long version ==
The original "long version", called Tractatus (or Speculum) artis bene moriendi, was composed in 1415 by an anonymous Dominican friar, probably at the request of the Council of Constance (1414–1418, Germany). This was widely read and translated into most West European languages, and was very popular in England, where a tradition of consolatory death literature survived until the 17th century. Works in the English tradition include The Way of Dying Well and The Sick Mannes Salve. In 1650, Holy Living and Holy Dying became the "artistic climax" of the tradition that had begun with Ars moriendi.

Ars Moriendi was also among the first books printed with movable type and was widely circulated in nearly 100 editions before 1500, in particular in Germany. The long version survives in about 300 manuscript versions, only one illustrated.

Ars moriendi consists of six chapters:

1. The first chapter explains that dying has a good side, and serves to console the dying man that death is not something to be afraid of.
2. The second chapter outlines the five temptations that beset a dying man, and how to avoid them. These are lack of faith, despair, impatience, spiritual pride and avarice.
3. The third chapter lists the seven questions to ask a dying man, along with consolation available to him through the redemptive powers of Christ's love.
4. The fourth chapter expresses the need to imitate Christ's life.
5. The fifth chapter addresses the friends and family, outlining the general rules of behavior at the deathbed.
6. The sixth chapter includes appropriate prayers to be said for a dying man.

== Short version ==
The "short version", whose appearance shortly precedes the introduction in the 1460s of block books (books printed from carved blocks of wood, both text and images on the same block), first dates to around 1450, from the Netherlands. It is mostly an adaptation of the second chapter of the "long version", and contains eleven woodcut pictures. The first ten woodcuts are divided into 5 pairs, with each set showing a picture of the devil presenting one of the 5 temptations, and the second picture showing the proper remedy for that temptation. The last woodcut shows the dying man, presumably having successfully navigated the maze of temptations, being accepted into heaven, and the devils going back to hell in confusion.

The "short version" was as popular as the "long version", but there was no English translation, perhaps because educated English people at the time were expected to understand several European languages. There are six extant manuscripts of the short version, most not illustrated, and over twenty extant blockbook illustrated editions, using 13 different sets of blocks.

== Images ==
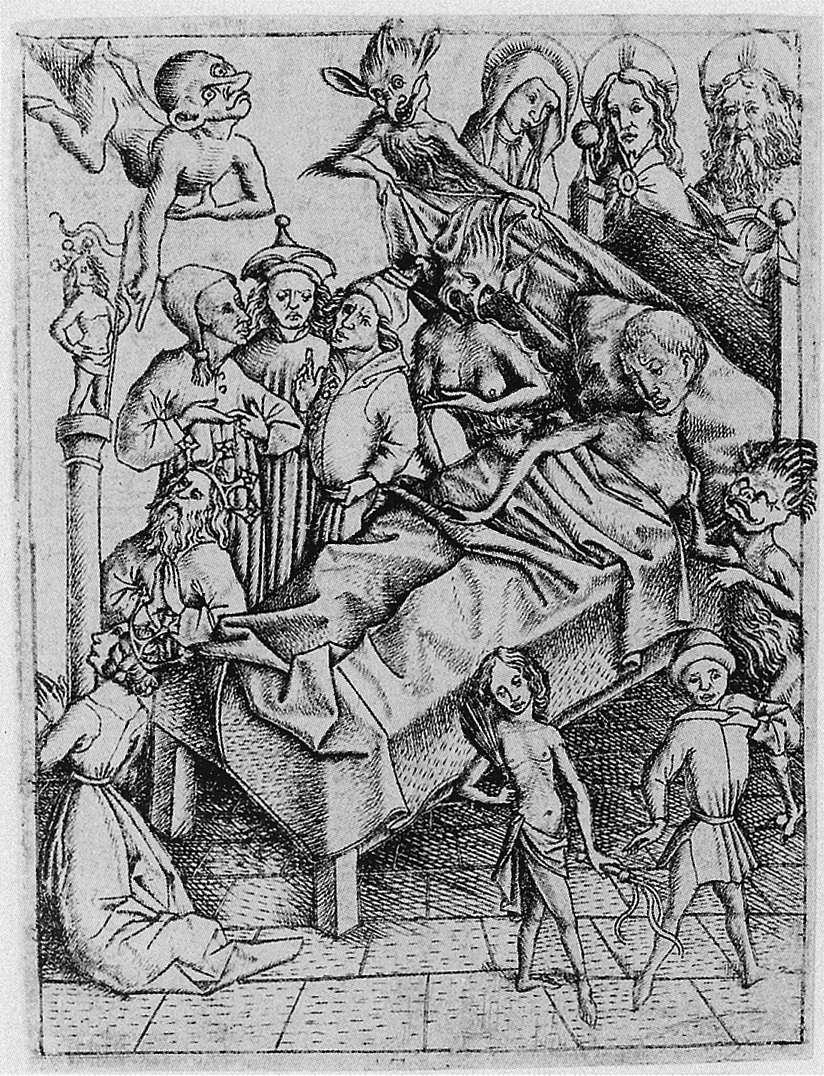
Temptation of lack of Faith; engraving by Master E. S., c. 1450

As well as the eleven different sets of blockbook woodcuts, there is a set by Master E. S. in engraving. The lengthy controversy over their respective dating and priority is now resolved by the discovery by Fritz Saxl of an earlier illuminated manuscript, of well before 1450, from whose tradition all the images in the printed versions clearly derive. Studies of the watermarks of the blockbooks by Allen Stevenson at the British Museum in the 1960s confirmed that none of them predated the 1460s, so Master E. S.' engravings are the earliest printed versions, dating from around 1450. The images remain largely the same in all media for the rest of the century.

There is the exceptional number of about seventy incunabulum editions, in a variety of languages, from Catalan to Dutch, the earliest from about 1474 from Cologne.

Allegorically the images depicted the contest between angels and demons over the fate of the dying man. In his dying agony his soul emerges from his mouth to be received by one of a band of angels. The soul was often depicted as a miniature person who would either be escorted to heaven by the angels or sent to the fires of hell or years in Purgatory. Common themes portrayed by illustrators include skeletons, the Last Judgement, corpses, and the forces of good and evil battling over souls.

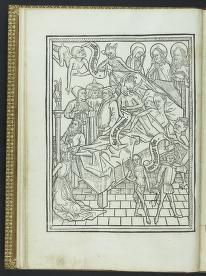
Ars moriendi.1

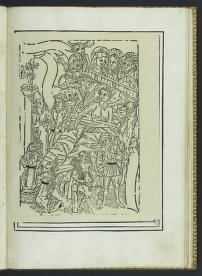
Ars moriendi.2

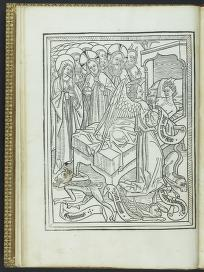
Ars moriendi.3

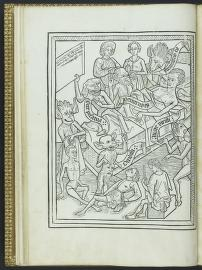
Ars moriendi.4

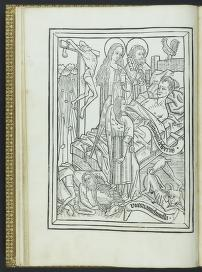
Ars moriendi.5

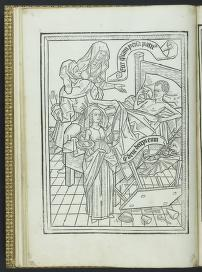
Ars moriendi.6

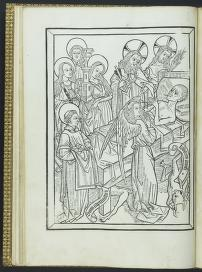
Ars moriendi.7

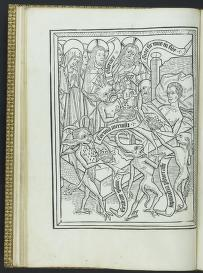
Ars moriendi.8

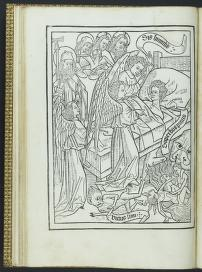
Ars moriendi.9

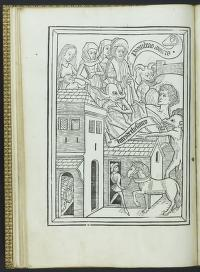
Ars moriendi.10

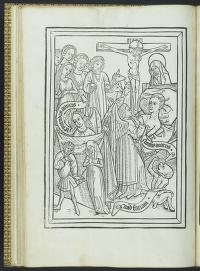
Ars moriendi.11

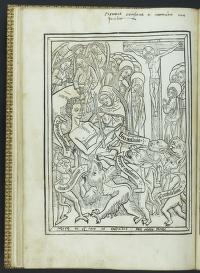
Ars moriendi.12

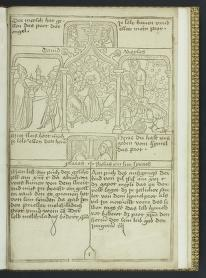
Ars moriendi.13

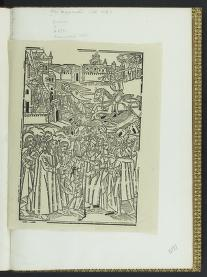
Ars moriendi.14

== Extended tradition ==
The popularity of the Ars moriendi texts developed into a broader tradition of writing on the good death. Jeremy Taylor's books Holy Living and Holy Dying, published in 1650 and 1651, exemplify that tradition. It developed in both Protestant and Catholic veins and continued in various forms through the nineteenth century.

== London ==
In England during the 15th century, the Ars Moriendi was popular among laymen. Beginning when clerical scholars formulated the Ars Moriendi into a book, The Book of the Craft of Dying, easily spread the concept of the good death throughout England. More specifically, the Book and the good death concept heavily influenced common Londoners' perceptions and understandings of death. Inspired to achieve and strive for perfection in their everyday life, 15th-century common Londoners flocked to the Book to know how one could achieve a good death. In doing so, the Londoners seemed to latch on to a specific characteristic that stuck heavily out from the previously mentioned Ars Moriendi chapters that then again composed the popular Book of the Craft of Dying.

== Legality ==
Throughout the six chapters, there is a common theme that resembles a quasi-legal sentiment shining through in good death tradition. Inspired by the Ars Moriendi and the popular, The Book of the Craft of Dying during the 15th century, Londoners and western Europe at large gravitated towards a quasi-legal relationship with death and God that ensured the rightful passing of not only one's physical belonging but, also one's spiritual soul. This gravitation can be explained when looking at certain chapters of The Book of the Craft of Dying that extremely highlight this development. The Book's instruction that one should find peace with God before dying resembles a concept of settling one's soul within the good death tradition as the discourse the author uses is very legal-sounding. Especially striking is the use of the word, "will," when describing one's relationship with God upon dying. The notion of a will in the good death tradition resembles a physical and metaphysical legal confirmation of the rightful passing of one's physical and spiritual belongings. Though the word is used more often as a synonym for power in this source, its inclusion must not be overlooked as certain phrases hint towards a quasi-contractual relationship between the dying human and the divine. For instance, the phrase "but he should take his (the dying person) death gladly and willingly… conforming and submitting his belief to God's will alone." In this instance, the mention of wills between the dying person and God resembles both a power relationship and also a contractual relationship that imagines the dying person surrendering his spirit in a legal fashion to God in effort to help quell the worries of their soul and thus, "die well… gladly and willingly." In this fashion, the dying person is essentially signing their soul and spirit over to God, thus partaking in this quasi-legal practice and understanding of death.

Also, The Book's instruction to question the dying person is striking material that resembles a quasi-legal practice and understanding of death. Continuing in the same source, a few chapters later, the author instructs the audience to ask certain questions such as, "Do you acknowledge that you have not done as well as you might have done?" and "Do you repent of that?" These questions ring of legal terminology that again help sign the soul over to God in effort to accomplish the soul's peace before death. If the person is asked and does answer these questions truthfully, then "he shall truly be saved." Though, if none were asked upon their death, then "without no doubt no man may be saved everlastingly."[3] Thus, the questioning and response of the dying person is so vital to the accomplishment of the good death that it takes on the importance of a legal matter. Therefore, in a similar vein as the explained double meaning use of the word, "will" in the earlier phrases, it seems again that Ars Moriendi and thus, The Book as well, are reaffirming and popularizing the legal-like attributes that then construct the good death tradition.

== Class distinctions ==
Though the Ars Moriendi and works that pushed the good death concept such as The Book of the Craft of Dying remained the dominant understanding of death throughout the 14th and 15th centuries in western Europe, class distinctions continued to add variety to this conclusion. Laymen and commoners in western Europe heavily understood death through the good death concept and tradition, but at the clerical and noble level of society, there were distinctions that did not totally agree with Ars Moriendi and the good death tradition. At the clerical level, the emerging rise of scholasticism inspired a review of past Christian theology and traditions touching all parts of Christian life - death, was one of these battlegrounds between scholasticism and traditional Christian thought. Here, clerical officials and students hotly debated the importance of sin in relation to one's death. For the traditionalists, one's personal sin determined their coming death, thus explaining that when striving to achieve the good death, one must be right with God. This concept is founded back to old Church law Canon 22 of Lateran IV (1215). Canon 22 states, "so that after spiritual health (through practices of the good death) has been restored to them (the dying person), the application of bodily medicine may be of greater benefit, for the cause being removed the effect will pass away." For those who embraced the scholasticism approach, one's personal sin mattered little. Rather, because of Adam and Eve's original sin, we were all destined to die thus, naturalizing death and somewhat shattered the established narrative that the good death tradition promoted. One scholar who embraced scholasticism writes of death, "On the causes of disease, that is, why people become ill, I reply, there are three [sic] reasons: the first is spiritual, that is, sin [...] The reason for all this is that the first man was created by God, was placed in terrestrial paradise in a state of innocence […] so that he [God] took care of the active and passive qualities of the elements that were in the human body lest they act against each other […] But because Adam was disobedient to God […] God permitted the elemental qualities to act against each other and consequently the body becomes ill and dies." Though this division in thought would challenge the previously established Ars Moriendi and good death tradition, the popularity of such works as The Book of the Craft of Dying indicate that this concept continued to thrive under pressure.

== See also ==
- Bardo Thodol, Tibetan Book of the Dead
- Book of the Dead (Egyptian)
- Consolatio
- Danse Macabre
- Memento mori
- Speculum Humanae Salvationis
- Vanitas
