= Altham (car) =

American automobile, made 1898–1899

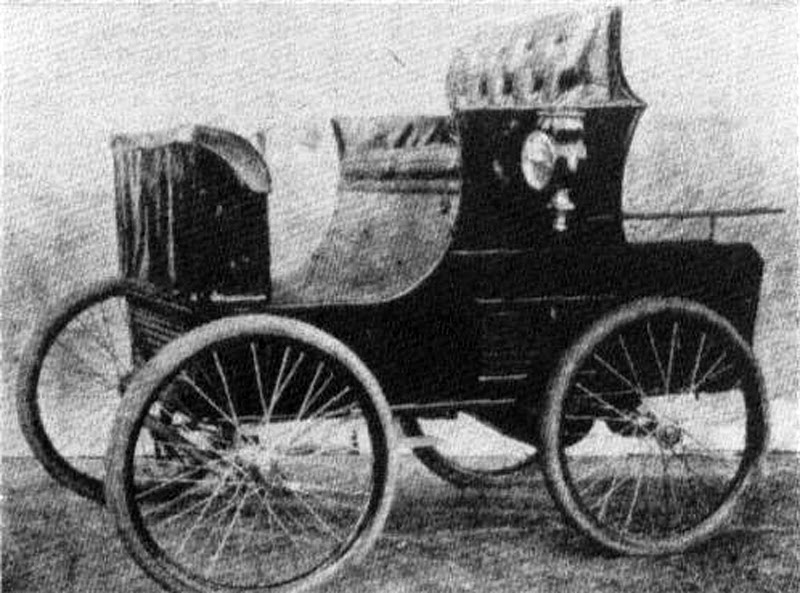
- The Altham car in 1898.

Overview
- Manufacturer: Altham International Motor Car Company
- Also called: Altham 6 HP
- Production: 1898–1899
- Assembly: Fall River, Massachusetts, United States
- Designer: George J. Altham

Body and chassis
- Class: Automobile
- Body style: Phaeton
- Layout: Rear Engine, RWD

Powertrain
- Engine: 1,500.0 cubic centimetres (91.54 cu in; 1.5000 L) Inline Twin
- Power output: 6 brake horsepower (4.5 kW; 6.1 PS) at 1,000 rpm 7 pound force-feet (9.5 N⋅m)
- Transmission: 2-speed forward, no Reverse

Dimensions
- Curb weight: 1,100 pounds (500 kg)

The Altham was an automobile manufactured from 1898 to 1899, in Fall River, Massachusetts in the United States. It was designed by George J. Altham, and manufactured by Altham International Motor Car Company, which was based in Boston, Massachusetts.

== History ==
In 1896, designer George J. Altham from Fall River, Massachusetts in the United States, following years of work, constructed a petrol engine. In August 1897, he installed it in a vehicle for testing purposes. In 1898, Altham International Motor Car Company was established, with its headquarters in Boston, Massachusetts. By October 1898, the working prototype was sufficiently developed, and the commercial production of the Altham car had begun. The manufacturing plant was located in Fall River, Massachusetts. Its production ceased in 1899, with only a few vehicles being built overall.

== Specifications ==
The Altham car had an air-cooled two-cylinder petrol engine, with 6 horsepower (4.4 kW), and 1000 revolutions per minute. The vehicle had two seats.
