= Andreas Althamer =

German humanist

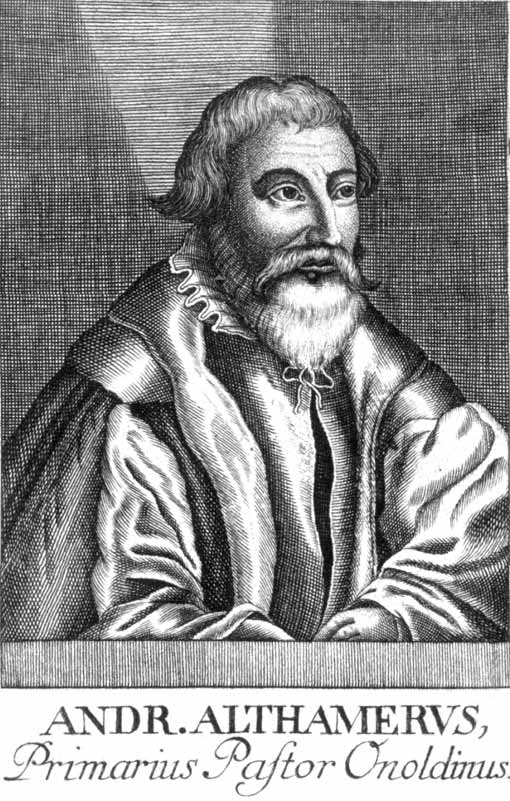
Andreas Althamer

Andreas Althamer (also Andreas Altheimer) (c. 1500 – c. 1539) was a German humanist and Lutheran reformer. He was born in Brenz. He studied at the universities of Leipzig and Tübingen. After completing his studies, he became a schoolteacher in Halle (Saale), Schwäbisch Hall and Reutlingen. In 1524, he was a priest in Schwäbisch Gmünd, where he tried to introduce the Reformation. He met with resistance from the Gmünder Council.

In 1525, in order to escape persecution due to his Lutheran leanings, he fled to the University of Wittenberg. He took a degree in theology and became a student of Martin Luther.

He was the first to write a catechism in 1528 that actually carried that title "on the cover", a year before Luther wrote his own.

As a deacon in the Sebalduskirche in Nürnberg, he took part in the Bern Disputation of 1528. In May, on the recommendation of Lazarus Spengler, he was appointed pastor to the city of Ansbach by George the Pious .

He died in Ansbach.
