= Golden Grove (1786 ship) =

History

Great Britain
- Name: Golden Grove
- Owner: Various
- Builder: Teignmouth
- Launched: 1786
- Fate: Lost c.1821

General characteristics
- Tons burthen: 204, or 240 (bm)
- Sail plan: Full-rigged ship
- Armament: 1804:2 × 6-pounder + 2 × 4-pounder guns; 1806:6 × 18-pounder carronades

Golden Grove was launched at Teighnmouth in 1786 as a West Indiaman, and apparently immediately sailed to the West Indies. She first entered Lloyd's Registry in 1793 with Tobagonian ownership. She then became a London-based West Indiaman. After 1810 she apparently started sailing between London and Dublin. In 1817 she grounded but was gotten off. She was lost c.1821.

== Career ==
Although Golden Grove was launched in 1786, she did not appear in Lloyd's Register until 1793. At that time her master was M'Leod, her owner was in Tobago, and her trade was Tobago—London.

Year	Master	Owner	Trade	Source
1794	J. M'Leod	Tobago; J. Ruddock	London—Tobago	Lloyd's Register
1795	M'Leod	Ruddock	London—Tobago	Lloyd's Register
1800	W. Butler	Oldham & Co.	London—Jamaica	Lloyd's Register
1804	C. Groves	Mills	London—Jamaica	Lloyd's Register
1805	Groves	Mills	London—Jamaica	Lloyd's Register

On 18 August, the Jamaica Fleet, 109 vessels under the escort of four vessels of the Royal Navy, left Jamaica for England, Golden Grove among them. They cleared the Gulf, but then between 21 and 23 August encountered a severe gale. Nine vessels foundered, but Golden Grove was among those "well" on the 25th.

== Later career ==
Year	Master	Owner	Trade	Source
1806	G. Place	Gardner	London transport	Register of Shipping (RS)
1809	G. Place	Gardner	London—St Vincent	RS
1809	G. Pearce	Gardner	London—San Domingo	LR
1810	G. Place; W. Scott	Gardner	London—Demerara; London—Lisbon	RS
1815	R.Condon	Gardner	Cork	LR
1820	Taylor	Gardner	London–Dublin	RS

On 21 January 1817 Golden Grove, Taylor, master, ran aground on the Sow and Pigs Sandbank, in the North Sea off the coast of Northumberland. She was on a voyage from Gothenburg, Sweden to Stockton-on-Tees, County Durham.

== Fate ==
LR for 1821 carried the annotation "Lost" by her name.
