= James Altham =

Member of the Parliament of England

Sir James Altham
- Baron Altham
- Born: City of London
- Died: Oxhey Hall Place, Hertfordshire, England
- Wife: Margaret Skinner; Mary Stapers; Helen Saunderson
- Father: James Altham
- Mother: Elizabeth Blancke
- Occupation: barrister judge member of parliament

Sir James Altham (about 1554 - 1617), of Oxhey, Hertfordshire, was an English judge, briefly a member of the Parliament of England, and (from 1607) a Baron of the Exchequer. A friend of Lord Chancellor Francis Bacon, Altham opposed Edward Coke but advanced the laws of equity behind the fastness of the Exchequer courts, so long considered almost inferior. Through advanced Jacobean royalism he helped to prosecute the King's enemies and centralise royal power of taxation. With Sir Edward Bromley, he presided at the Lancashire witch trials in 1612.

== Early life ==
James Altham was descended from Christopher Altham of Girlington, in the West Riding of Yorkshire. He was the third son (of five) of citizen and Clothworker James Altham (died 1583) of Mark Hall, Latton, in Essex, Sheriff of London in 1557–58, and sheriff of Essex in 1570, by his first wife. Alderman Altham was himself the son of Edward Altham (died 1548), a Master of the Fullers' Company, which had merged with the Shearmen in c. 1528–1530 to form the Worshipful Company of Clothworkers: Edward, although never an alderman, served a term as Sheriff of London in 1531-32 together with Richard Gresham, in the mayoralty of Sir Nicholas Lambert. Edward, who requested burial at St Martin Outwich, in Bishopsgate, left his properties in Dagenham and Barking to his son James and to the heirs of his body.

James Altham's mother was the alderman's first wife Elizabeth Blancke (married January 1548/49), daughter of Thomas Blancke of London, Haberdasher (died 1562), and sister of Sir Thomas Blanke, Lord Mayor of London in 1583. The elder Blanke had built for himself the mansion of "Abbottes Inne", on the historic site of the Abbot of Waltham's house in the London parish of St Mary-at-Hill. Elizabeth Altham died in childbirth in 1558 and received a public funeral at St Martin's church. After this alderman Altham became the fourth husband of Mary Matthew, successively the wife of one Woolley, of the citizen and Skinner Thomas Langton (died c. 1550), and of Sir Andrew Judde (died 1558).

As a consequence of this marriage, James Altham junior became the step-brother of Mary Langton, wife of Admiral Sir William Wynter. His stepmother, Dame Mary Judd, was, together with James and his brothers Thomas and Edward, the alderman's executor in March 1582/83: she lived down to 1602. The eldest brother becoming Roman Catholic, Mark Hall at Latton was inherited by the second brother Edward (died 1605), and descended to his heirs. On 16 June 1584, James Altham married his first wife Margaret Skynner at St Dunstan-in-the-East. With the death of Sir Thomas Blancke in 1588, the Blancke properties in London devolved in remainder upon Thomas Altham (then of Oxford, aged 38) or Edward Altham, subject to a lifetime occupancy for the widow Dame Margaret Blancke.

James Altham followed his elder brothers to the University of Cambridge (where they had matriculated as fellow-commoners from Clare College in 1567, before being admitted together to Lincoln's Inn in 1570). "Specially admitted" a fellow-commoner at Trinity College, Cambridge in 1571, he entered Gray's Inn in 1575 and was called to the bar in 1581. Following his marriage, he is mentioned in Croke's reports for the first time as arguing a case in the Queen's Bench in 1587. Shortly before he entered the Commons, he was made an Ancient of Gray's Inn, granting superior status over juniors at the all-important dinners. In 1589, he was elected M.P. for Bramber in Sussex. For some unknown reason there are no surviving records of Altham's activities during the sessions. All that has come down is his drafting of seven bills for the Parliament of 1601, during which Robert Cecil, 1st Earl of Salisbury passed some of the most significant social laws of the period.

== Legal career ==
=== Recommended for Recorder of London (1595) ===
In 1595, when the resignation of Thomas Fleming as Recorder of London (1594–1595) was contemplated in preparation for his appointment as Solicitor General, the Queen invited the city to propose names to be considered for his successor. The citizens, fearing that it might be intended to curtail certain of their traditional liberties, decided to propose one name only, that of James Altham, as one who might be expected to uphold their interests. Sir John Spencer, Lord Mayor (1594–1595) wrote of him in a letter to the Lord Treasurer:

"And, for mine own opinion, my good Lord, as also of many others, we have one born and dwelling among us, whom we have great experience of, and think very able to do us service in this behalfe. His name is Mr. James Altham, son of Mr. Altham, late of Essex, Esq., he is a Bencher of Gray's Inn, and one of our ordinary Sworn Counsellors of the City, well acquainted with our customes, and very well thought of for his honestie and skill in law, both throughout the whole City, and elsewhere, and being in election last time, did very narrowly miss it: in which respects, and for the good hope we have of him, myself and many others do, only for the good of the City, earnestly wish him the place, if her Majesty shall please to remove the other; nothing doubting, but that her most excellent Majesty, and your good Lordship, and my other Lords, will take very good liking of him..."

Altham, however, was passed over a second time, in favour of John Croke.

=== Serjeant-at-law (1603), Baron of the Exchequer (1607) ===
He was appointed reader at Gray's Inn in 1600, and in 1603 double reader (duplex lector): in the latter year he was made serjeant-at-law. He was one of eleven called to that degree at that time by writ of Queen Elizabeth, which on occasion of the monarch's death almost immediately afterwards was renewed by writ of James I, so that they and three others were sworn on 17 May 1603. On 1 February 1607 he was appointed one of the barons of the exchequer, in succession to Sir John Savile, and knighted.

=== Case of Proclamations (1610) ===
In 1610, a question having arisen concerning the power of the crown to impose restrictions on trade and industry by proclamation, the two chief justices, the chief baron, and Baron Altham were appointed to consider the matter. The result of their consultation was that they unanimously resolved "that the king by his proclamation cannot create any offence which was not an offence before ... That the king hath no prerogative but that which the law of the land allows him ... and lastly, that if an offence be not punishable in the Star Chamber, the prohibition of it by proclamation cannot make it punishable there."

=== Heretics (1611) ===
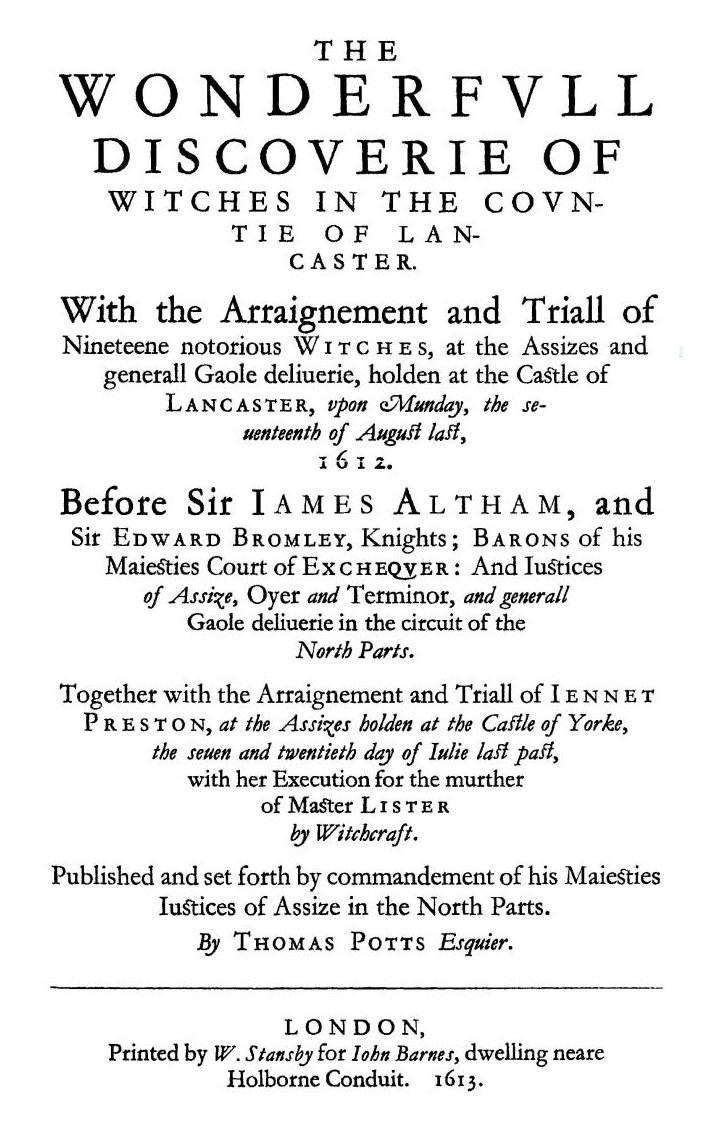
Title text of The Wonderfull Discoverie, 1613

Altham was one of the judges whose opinion was taken in 1611 by Lord Chancellor Ellesmere on the case of the heretics Bartholomew Legate and Edward Wightman, whom Archbishop Abbot wanted burned. Altham was reputed hostile to Edward Coke, who was deliberately not consulted. The two men were burned, one at Smithfield, the other at Burton-upon-Trent.

=== Lancashire witch trials (1612) ===
In 1612 Sir James Altham and Sir Edward Bromley were the presiding judges in the Lancashire witch trials, held at the Lancaster assizes in August, in which twenty men and women were tried as witches, among them the Pendle witches and the Samlesbury witches, of whom eleven were found guilty and were hanged. The judges gave orders to the clerk of the assizes, Thomas Potts, to write a full account of the proceedings, which was published in London in 1613 as The Wonderfull Discoverie of Witches in the Countie of Lancaster.

=== Power of Commendam (1616) ===
Altham's signature, together with those of the other twelve judges, is appended to the letter to the king relative to his action in the commendam case of 1616, in which the power of the crown to stay proceedings in the courts of justice in matters affecting its prerogative is denied. A serjeant-at-law, in arguing a case involving the right of the crown to grant commendams, i.e. licences to hold benefices that otherwise would be vacated, had in the performance of his duty disputed, first, the existence of any such prerogative except in cases of necessity; secondly, the possibility of any such case arising. They thereupon wrote by his attorney-general, Francis Bacon, a letter addressed to Lord Coke requiring that all proceedings in the cause should be stayed. This letter having been communicated to the judges, they assembled, and after consultation the letter already mentioned was sent to the king. The king replied by convening a council and summoning the judges to attend thereat. They attended, and, having been admonished by the king and the attorney-general, all, with the exception of Coke, fell upon their knees, acknowledged their error, and promised amendment.

== Oxhey: estate and chapel ==
The manor of Marks, in Leyton and Walthamstow (Essex), was granted to Paul Withypoll and his son Edmund in 1544. Descending in that family, it passed to Edmund's grandson Edmund, who sold it in 1601 to Sir James Altham. Sir James was in possession of the manor of Le Marke in Leyton in 1616, and also of the manor of Bohun's Hall (Boones Hall) at Tollesbury, Essex. Both descended through his son James to the co-heirs, Elizabeth and Frances.

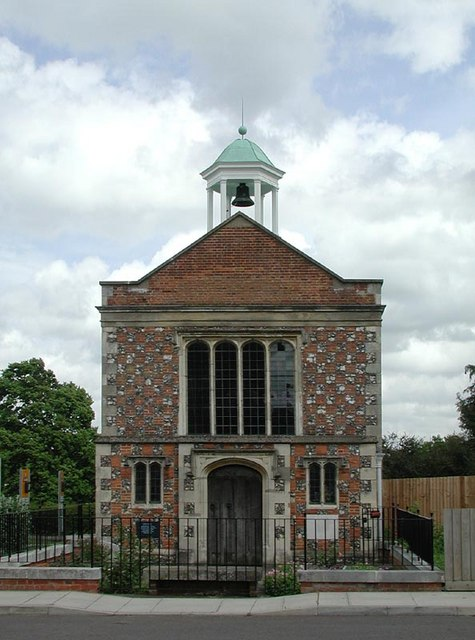
Oxhey Chapel, built by Sir James Altham in 1612 (since modified). Image: John Salmon

The estate of Oxhey, near Watford, Hertfordshire was imparked during the Middle Ages, and disparked in 1598, with licence granted to Francis Heydon to fell the timber and turn the land to tillage. In 1601 Heydon sold an estate of 500 acres to Henry Fleetwood of Gray's Inn, consisting of the capital messuage of St Cleer's in Oxhey, "and the impaled or warren ground with the Warren house or lodge called Edeswick or Oxhey Lodge, and also part of the old park called Oxhey Park, and the house called Merry Hill House or Hamonds lying near Oxhey Wood, in the tenure of William Hamond by lease of Francis Heydon". Fleetwood sold it in 1602 to Robert Bowyer and Richard Fusse of London, who conveyed it entire to James Altham, serjeant-at-law, in 1604. Altham thereupon built a very large house called St Clowes, or Cleer's, or Oxhey Place Hall, at a cost of £3000, and with its orchard and garden enclosed some five to seven acres with a brick wall. The Annesley coheirs sold the estate to John Heydon of Lincoln's Inn in 1639 (the year after the death of Dame Helen Altham), and Altham's great house was later demolished and replaced by a different great mansion.

A piece of glass with the arms of Altham, dated 1611, is or was preserved in the vestry of the church of Bushey nearby. In 1612 Altham constructed a private chapel at Oxhey, which is still standing although modified and restored at various times. It contains fine later 17th-century furnishings. A dedicatory inscription reads:

"This Chappel Was Bvilt For A Hovse Of Prayer Ao Dni 1612 By Sr Iames Altham Knight One Of Ye Barons Of Ye Escheqver. Take Heede, To Thy Foote, When Thou Entrest Into The Hovse Of God And Bee More Neere To Heare Then To Give The Sacrifice Of Fooles. - Eccles. V"

The Altham religious stance leant towards the Puritan, as is suggested by the dedication of the translation by Robert Vaux from Martin Chemnitz's Examen Concilii Tridentini to Sir James's father, "M. James Altham, Esq.; and the lady Iudde his wife", in 1582. More exactly contemporary with the chapel was Japhets first publique Perswasion into Sems Tents, by the Calvinist Thomas Taylor, published in 1612 with dedications to Sir James Altham and Sir Charles Morrison, of Watford.

=== Death and monument ===
Altham died on 21 February 1617, and the Lord Keeper, Sir Francis Bacon, in appointing his successor, characterised the late baron as "one of the gravest and most reverend of the judges of this kingdom." His will was proved on 10 March 1616/17. In making his bequests he did not follow the London custom, observing: "Although I was born free of London yet in respect I never was tradesman nor have lived as a Citizen and freeman I hope neither my wife nor any of my children will be so contentious or unkinde as to quarrell aboute any customarie division of my goodes...", and so making his own division of a considerable quantity of plate, property and goods between them.

He was buried in Oxhey Chapel, where he is commemorated by a wall monument to himself and his last wife which he prepared during his lifetime. It is a substantial composite marble monument with polychrome details: large kneeling figures of the baron and his wife are shown in attitude of prayer, both facing dexter and each within a separate arched marble frame. The baron is attired in his red robes with white linings and a black close-fitting cap (coif), while Dame Helen wears a black robe with a broad white ruff at the neck edged with gilt, her hair raised stiffly above her forehead under a black headdress. The surrounding framework and back panels are of pink variegated marble edged with white marble quoins and mouldings: a white ornamental marble transom crosses behind the arched recesses to reinforce the appearance of architectural surroundings. The internal facings of the arches are set with carved and painted rosettes.

The whole construction stands on a demi-projecting white table supported below by black marble corbels and white soffits, and from the table arise three elegant black marble pillars with gilded Corinthian capitals, one at each side and one central. These support the composite entablature above, which displays two strips of black marble sandwiched between the white mouldings. Above this is a large arching broken pediment, the mouldings richly veined, the fields inset with ochreous panels, and the broken terminals sculpted into broad foliated scrolls. On a central pedestal between them are supported the feet of a very large circular escutcheon, rising clear above the top of the monument (with finials at its top and sides), on which are painted in polychrome the shield, crest and mantling of the baron's armorial bearings. From the outer ends of the pediment arise two tall black pyramidal pinnacles. The memorial inscription, lettered in gilt incised capitals, is on a black marble stone set into the wall beneath the monument, enclosed within a rectangular frame of white marble chased with foliate scrollwork.

Dame Helen died on 21 April 1638.

A portrait dated 1617, showing a bearded gentleman aged 78, held by the National Trust at Kingston Lacy, Dorset, is suggested to be of Sir James Altham. However, as this person must have been born c. 1540, he is too old to be the third son of James Altham and Elizabeth Blancke, who married in 1548/49.

== Family ==
By his first wife, Margaret, daughter of Oliver Skinner, Altham had issue one child only, a son:

- James Altham, afterwards Sir James Altham of Oxhey, knight. This Sir James Altham married Elizabeth, daughter of Sir Richard Sutton (MP, died 1634) of London, and had issue a boy, who died in infancy, and two daughters, Elizabeth and Frances: His widow had licence to remarry in April 1623 (aged 27) to Sir John Ashfield (aged 30) at St Botolph, Aldersgate.
  - Elizabeth Altham married Arthur Annesley, second Viscount Valentia and first Earl of Anglesey, whose second son, Altham Annesley, was created in 1680 Baron Altham of Altham, with limitation in default of male issue to his younger brothers. His only son dying in infancy, the title devolved upon the younger branch of the Annesley family, who subsequently succeeded to the earldom of Anglesey. The earldom lapsed in 1771, when the English House of Lords decided against the legitimacy of the last claimant.
  - Frances Altham, the second daughter, married Richard Vaughan, 2nd Earl of Carbery. The title lapsed in 1713.

By his second wife, Mary, daughter of Richard Stapers, Esq., Altham had three children, a son and two daughters:

- Richard Altham, who died without issue
- Elizabeth Altham married first Sir Francis Astley (died 1638) of Hillmorton, Warwickshire, and Melton Constable, knight; secondly, Robert Digby, 1st Baron Digby (c. 1599–1642) (Irish peerage); and lastly, Sir Robert Bernard, 1st Baronet, serjeant-at-law. Elizabeth died 3 January 1662 and was buried at the church of Covent Garden.
- Mary Altham married Sir Francis Stydolph of Mickleham and Norbury Park, Surrey (d. 1655), and was the mother of Sir Richard Stydolph, Baronet.

By his third wife, Helen daughter of John Saunderson, merchant of London, Altham had no children. Helen was the widow of John Hyde, citizen and Grocer of London, by whom she had seven sons and ten daughters.

Robert Altham, currently a circuit judge is one of his descendants.
