= Jimmy Altham =

British philosopher (born 1944)

- Born: 1944 (age 81–82)
- Education: University of Cambridge
- Scientific career
- Workplaces: Gonville and Caius College, Cambridge

James Edward John Altham (born 1944), known as Jimmy Altham and normally cited as J. E. J. Altham, is a British philosopher and a Fellow of Gonville and Caius College, Cambridge.

== Biography ==
He obtained his BA degree in Philosophy at Cambridge followed in 1969 by a Ph.D. also in Philosophy. His dissertation was entitled 'Assertion, Command and Obligation. Philosophical Foundations of the Logic of Imperatives and Deontic Logic'.

Altham was then appointed a lecturer in the Faculty of Philosophy at Cambridge from 1972. He was a former Sidgwick lecturer in Philosophy and retired as professor in 1999. He is now an emeritus professor and Fellow at Gonville and Caius. He has published on a wide range of philosophical areas including logic, ethics and political philosophy.

== Selected publications ==
- The Logic of Plurality. London: Methuen, 1971.
- 'Rawls's Difference Principle'. Philosophy 48 (1973):75–78.
- 'Ethics of Risk'. Proceedings of the Aristotelian Society, 84 (1983), 15–29. Retrieved from https://www.jstor.org/stable/4545003
- 'Wicked promises' in I. Hacking (ed.), Exercises in Analysis. Cambridge University Press, 1985, pp. 1–21.
