= Robert Altham =

English judge

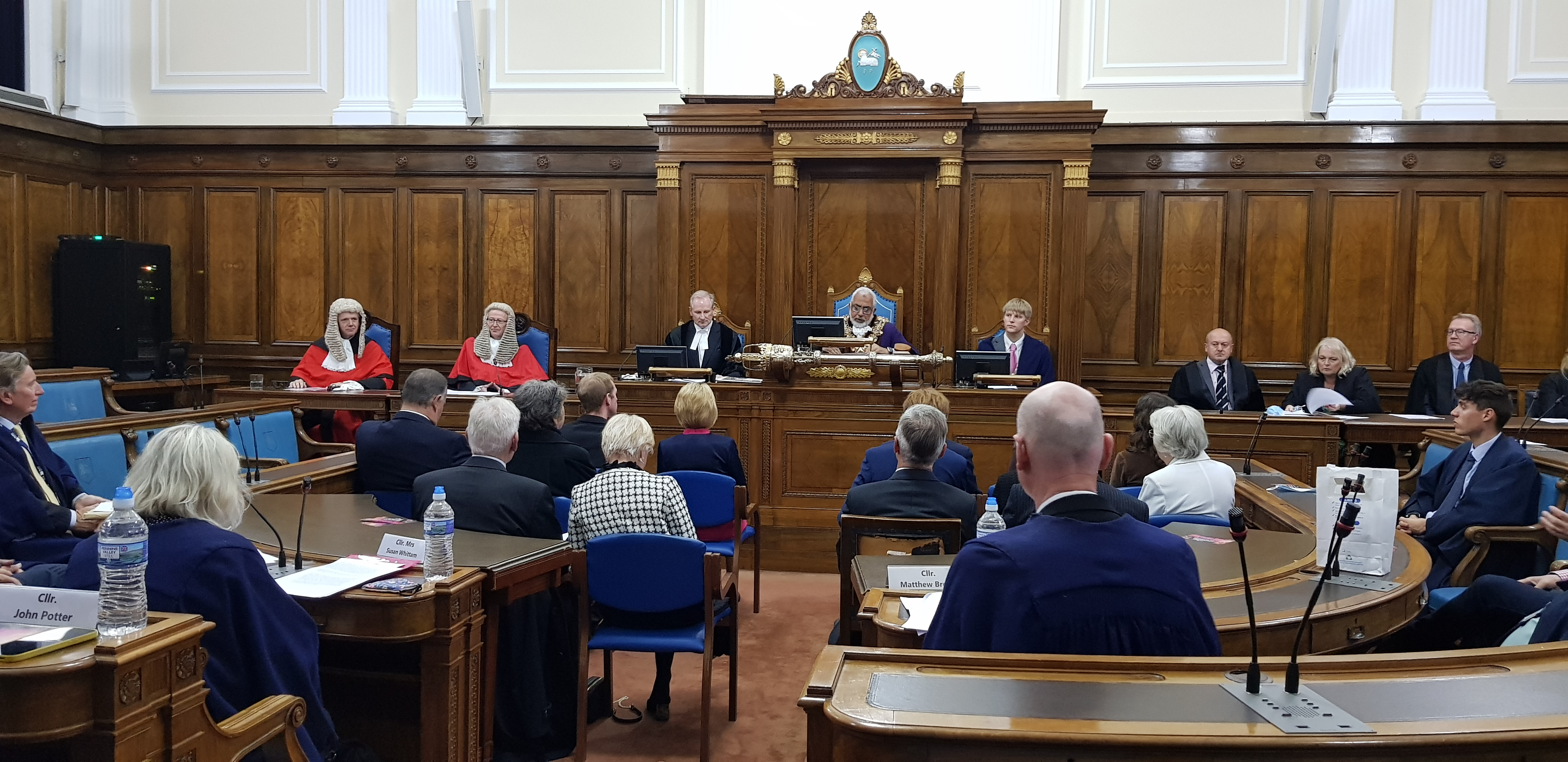
Installation of His Honour Judge Robert Altham (left) as Honorary Recorder of Preston following the retirement of His Honour Judge Mark Brown (second from Left) in Preston Council Chamber 23 September 2021.

John Robert Carr Altham, known as Robert Altham, is an English judge who became notable when he sentenced three anti-fracking protestors to prison on 26 September 2018. This was the first time environmental activists had received jail sentences for protesting in the UK since 1932 when the mass trespass of Kinder Scout was organised in the Peak District. The protesters appealed against the sentence after it came to light that Altham had family ties to the oil industry.

Altham is a circuit judge in the Crown Court in Preston Crown Court. He is a descendant of James Altham, himself a judge who presided over the Lancashire witch trials. Altham was born in Morecambe and attended Sandylands Primary School, Morecambe and Lancaster Royal Grammar School before studying Latin and Greek at University College London. He then gained his law qualifications at Birmingham University and the Inns of Court School of Law. He was called to the Bar at Gray's Inn in 1993 and went on to join the chambers of David Steer QC in Liverpool. In 2008 he became a Recorder.

Gordon Marsden, the MP for Blackpool South contacted the Attorney General, Geoffrey Cox to raise questions about Altham's handling of the 2018 fracking protest case, asking whether would "undertake an investigation into compliance with the Judicial Code of Conduct in relation to the trial".

At an appeal hearing held on 17 October Lord Burnett, Lord Chief Justice of England and Wales ruled that an "immediate custodial sentence in the case of these appellants was manifestly excessive". After saying that a community order imposing on them unpaid work would have been appropriate. However, as they had spent six weeks in prison he reduced the sentence to a conditional discharge.

Judicial Conduct Investigations Office spokesperson indicated they had received a complaint concerning Judge Robert Altham, which "will be considered in accordance with the Judicial Conduct Rules 2014". However, during the hearing Lord Burnett remarked that there was "no evidence" that the judge had any financial interest in fracking.

Judge Altham was installed as Honorary Recorder of Preston on 23 September 2021, a post dating back to 1685.
