= Henry Vaughan (Welsh politician, born 1613) =

Welsh politician (1613–1676)

Sir Henry Vaughan the younger (1613 – 26 December 1676), of Derwydd, Llandybie in Carmarthenshire, was a Welsh member of parliament.

He was the son of Sir Henry Vaughan the elder, a long-serving member of Parliament and leader of Royalist forces in Carmarthenshire during the English Civil War. Sir Henry had acquired the Derwydd estate by marriage to his wife Sage.

Henry the younger also fought on the Royalist side during the Civil War. In April 1645, he was defeated by Cromwell in a minor engagement at Bampton in the Bush, and he was captured at Tenby in 1648. After the Restoration he was knighted (in 1661), served as a justice of the peace for Carmarthenshire from 1660 to 1667 and was appointed High Sheriff of Carmarthenshire for 1661–62. He was a deputy lieutenant for the county from 1660 to 1667 and from 1674 to his death.

He was MP for Carmarthenshire from 1668 until 1676.

On his death he was buried in Llandybie church and was later succeeded at Derwydd by his nephew, Richard Vaughan.

Parliament of England
Preceded by Lord Vaughan	Member of Parliament for Carmarthenshire; 1668–1676	Succeeded by Altham Vaughan
