= Frances Vaughan, Countess of Carbery =

Frances Altham
- Countess of Carbery
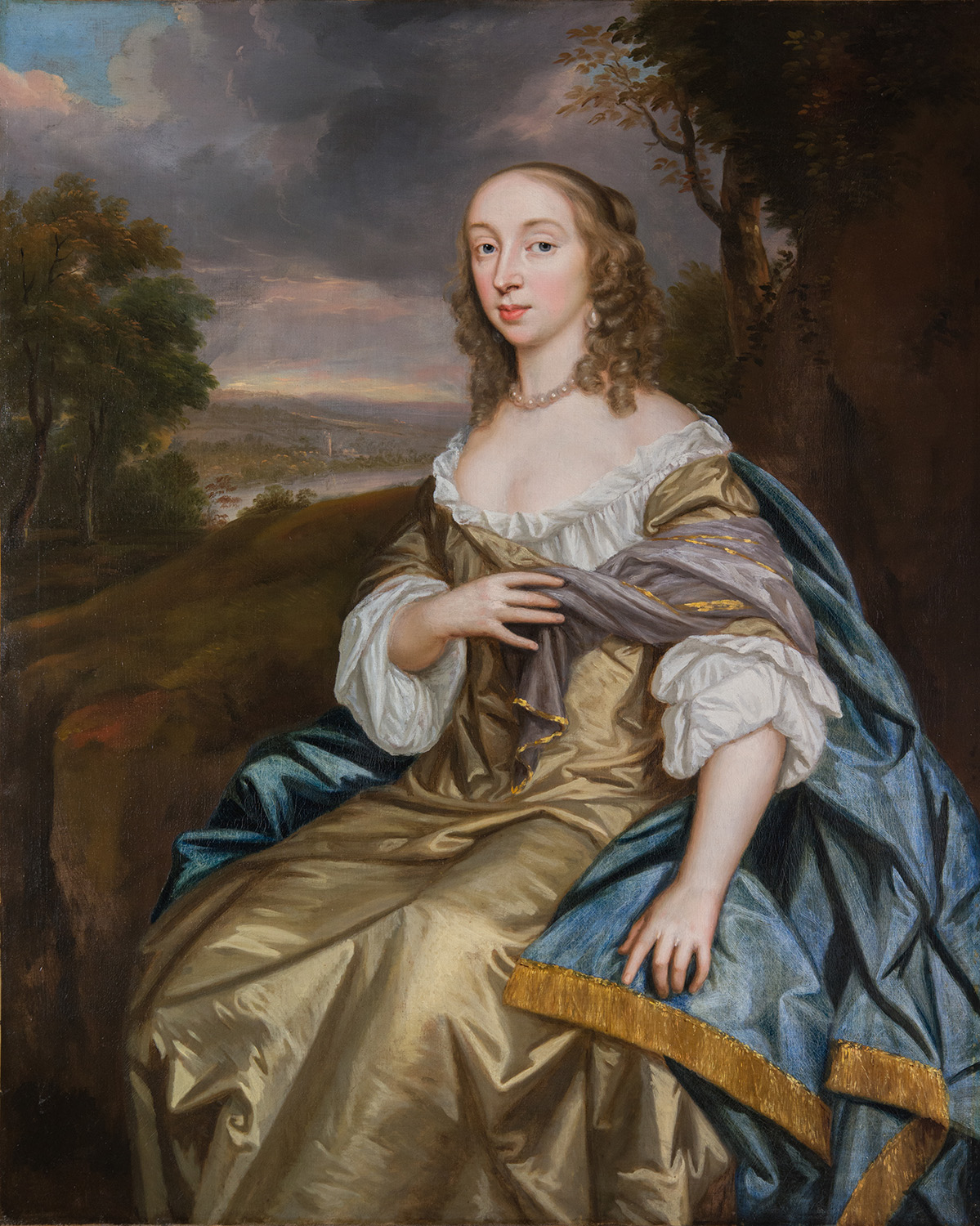
- Portrait of Frances Vaughan, thought to be a copy (c. 1670) by Mary Beale of an original painting by Sir Peter Lely (now lost)
- Born: c. 1621
- Died: 9 October 1650
- Noble family: Altham
- Spouse: Richard Vaughan, 2nd Earl of Carbery
- Issue: John Vaughan, 3rd Earl of Carbery; Francis Vaughn MP; Altham Vaughn MP
- Father: Sir James Altham of Oxhey
- Mother: Elizabeth Sutton

Frances Vaughan, Countess of Carbery (née Altham; c. 1621 – 9 October 1650) was the second wife of Richard Vaughan, 2nd Earl of Carbery. Her second son, John, became the 3rd Earl following his father's death in 1686.

Frances was one of the two daughters of Sir James Altham of Oxhey (son of the judge Sir James Altham) and his wife Elizabeth, the daughter of Sir Richard Sutton. Her sister Elizabeth married Arthur Annesley, 1st Earl of Anglesey. As co-heiresses, the Altham sisters had a considerable inheritance.

Frances and her husband had three sons, including the 3rd Earl. The other two were Francis, who became MP for Carmarthen in 1661 and died in 1667, some years before his father. Their third son, Altham (c.1642-1682), succeeded his father and brothers as MP for Carmarthen in 1679.

The Anglican writer Jeremy Taylor spent some time with the Earl and Countess at their Carmarthenshire residence, Gelli Aur (Golden Grove). Taylor dedicated the third volume of his work The Great Exemplar (1649) to Frances, and the sermon he gave at her funeral was published. Taylor said of the late countess that "she did not love her fortune for making her noble; but thought it would be a dishonour to her if she did not continue a nobleness and excellency of virtue..."
