= Golden Grove, Carmarthenshire =

Mansion and estate in Wales

Golden Grove
- Gelli Aur (Welsh)
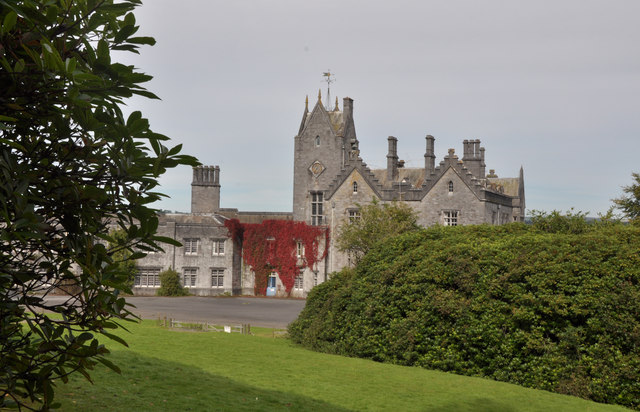
- Golden Grove in August 2005

- Location within Carmarthenshire
- 51°52′N 4°02′W
- Location: Llanfihangel Aberbythych
- OS grid reference: SN597198

History
- Built: 1834

Site notes
- Area: Carmarthenshire
- Architect: Jeffry Wyatville
- Owner: Golden Grove Trust

Listed Building – Grade II*
- Official name: Golden Grove Mansion
- Designated: 8 July 1966
- Reference no.: 10926

Golden Grove (Welsh: Gelli Aur) is a mansion and estate in the Welsh county of Carmarthenshire, located 4 miles (6 km) southwest of Llandeilo.

== History ==
There have been three mansions on the estate. The first was built in 1560 by the Vaughan family, which was later ennobled as Earls of Carbery. This was destroyed by fire and replaced in 1754 by a Neoclassical box of fine quality, with a long Doric-columned portico.

In 1804, the estate was bequeathed by John Vaughan, the last of the Golden Grove Vaughans, to his Oxford friend John Frederick Campbell, Lord Cawdor of Castlemartin, later 1st Earl Cawdor. He demolished the existing building and built the current house, designed by the leading architect Sir Jeffry Wyatville, 700 yards (640 m) to the south-west above the original (begun 1827, completed 1834).

Wyatville was simultaneously occupied in the extensive remodelling of Windsor Castle for King George IV, and subsequently King William lV, as well as the building of a remarkably similar property, Lilleshall Hall in Shropshire, for Cawdor's cousin, George Leveson-Gower, nephew of the Duke of Sutherland. Correspondence exists between the two families relating to the huge costs of construction of both Golden Grove and Lilleshall, and the problems in bringing them to completion created by Wyatville's preoccupation with the complexities and demands of his new schemes for the king.

Golden Grove remained in Cawdor family occupation until 1935. During the Second World War, it was occupied by the United States Army Air Forces. Subsequently, Carmarthenshire County Council used it as offices, and Coleg Sir Gâr operated it as an agricultural college until 2003.

Plans were made to convert the building to a hotel, to flats, and to a convalescent home, but the building remained unused and deteriorating until 2011, when the council sold the house and park to the Golden Grove Trust, formed to make the house a destination for art and cultural activities and restore the park. In 2015, it received a grant of almost £1 million from the Welsh Government.

== House, gardens and country park ==
The house has Scottish Baronial features in a Tudor or Elizabethan architectural style, although it is a late Regency, Georgian house and not a Victorian house. It is constructed of Llangyndeyrn limestone, traditionally called 'black marble'. Its national importance is recognised by its Grade II* listing. The gardens immediate on the house include an arboretum, laid out in the 1860s, and a deer park, both Grade II listed.

== In popular culture ==
The 2017 BBC television series Decline and Fall, based on the Evelyn Waugh novel, was filmed at Golden Grove, and in 2018 the house and park were primary filming locations for the film Six Minutes to Midnight.
