= Baron Altham =

Title in the Peerage of Ireland

Baron Altham, of Altham in the County of Cork, was a title in the Peerage of Ireland. It was created in 1681 for the Honourable Altham Annesley, younger son of Arthur Annesley, 1st Earl of Anglesey and Elizabeth Altham, daughter and co-heiress of Sir James Altham (see Viscount Valentia for earlier history of the Annesley family). The title was created with remainder to heirs male and in default thereof to his younger brothers and their male issue. In 1689 he was attainted by the Irish Parliament of James II and his estates were sequestered. However, after the deposition of James II he was restored and allowed to take his seat in the Irish House of Lords in 1695. He was succeeded by his son James, the second Baron, who died as an infant shortly after his father. The late Baron was succeeded according to the special remainder by his uncle Richard Annesley, the third Baron. He was a clergyman and served as Dean of Exeter. He was succeeded by his son, Arthur, the fourth Baron, whose son and rightful heir James Annesley was overlooked for the succession by his uncle, Richard Anglesey, the fifth Baron Altham and later sixth Earl of Anglesey. For further history of the legal battle that followed and the descent of the title, see Viscount Valentia.

== Barons Altham (1681) ==
- Altham Annesley, 1st Baron Altham (d. 1699)
- James George Annesley, 2nd Baron Altham (d. 1700)
- Richard Annesley, 3rd Baron Altham (1655–1701)
- Arthur Annesley, 4th Baron Altham (1689–1727)
- Richard Annesley, 6th Earl of Anglesey, 5th Baron Altham (1694–1761)
- Arthur Annesley, 1st Earl of Mountnorris, 6th Baron Altham (1744–1816)
- George Annesley, 2nd Earl of Mountnorris, 7th Baron Altham (1769–1844)

== Family tree ==
Annesley Family tree including the Earls of Anglesey, Earls Annesley, Earls of Mountnorris, Viscounts Glerawly , Viscounts Valentia and related titles

Viscount Valentia (1st creation), 1621	Baronet Annesley of Mountnorris, 1620; Baron Mountnorris, 1628; Viscount Valentia (2nd creation) as a reversionary grant, 1621 and then inherited, 1642
Henry Power d. 1642; 1st Viscount Valentia	Francis Annesley c. 1585 – 1660; 1st Viscount Valentia, etc.
Viscountcy Valentia (1st creation) passed to Francis Annesley
Earl of Anglesey (2nd creation) and Baron Annesley, 1661
Arthur Annesley; 1614–1686; 1st Earl of Anglesey, etc., 2nd Viscount Valentia, etc. m. Elizabeth Altham; 1620–1698	Francis Annesley b. 1628
Baron Altham, 1681
James Annesley c. 1645 – 1690; 2nd Earl of Anglesey, etc., 3rd Viscount Valentia, etc. m. Elizabeth Manners d. 1700	Frances Annesley d. 1705	Altham Annesley d. 1699; 1st Baron Altham	Richard Annesley d. 1701; 3rd Baron Altham	Francis Annesley; 1663–1750
Succession claims dubious	Baron Annesley, 1758; Viscount Glerawly, 1766
James Annesley; 1674–1702; 3rd Earl of Anglesey, etc., 4th Viscount Valentia, etc. m. Catherine Darnley c. 1681 – 1743	John Annesley; 1676–1710; 4th Earl of Anglesey, etc., 5th Viscount Valentia, etc. m. Henrietta Stanley; 1687–1714	Arthur Annesley c. 1678 – 1737; 5th Earl of Anglesey, etc., 6th Viscount Valentia, etc.	Mary Thompson d. 1719	James Annesley d. 1700; 2nd Baron Altham	Arthur Annesley; 1689–1727; 4th Baron Altham	Richard Annesley c. 1693 – 1761; 6th Earl of Anglesey, etc., 7th Viscount Valentia, etc., 5th Baron Altham m. Juliana Donovan d. 1777	Francis Annesley; 1701–1740	Martin Annesley; 1701–1749	William Annesley; 1710–1770; 1st Viscount Glerawly, etc.
Earldom of Anglesey deemed extinct, 1761
Earl of Mountnorris, 1793	Earl Annesley, 1789
Arthur Henry Annesley	James Annesley; 1715–1760	Dorothea Du Bois; 1728–1774	Arthur Annesley; 1744–1816; 1st Earl of Mountnorris, 8th Viscount Valentia, etc., 6th Baron Altham	Arthur Annesley; 1733–1773	Francis Annesley; 1740–1802; 1st Earl Annesley, 2nd Viscount Glerawly, etc.	Richard Annesley; 1745–1824; 2nd Earl Annesley, 3rd Viscount Glerawly, etc.
Arthur Henry Annesley; 1769–1845	George Annesley; 1770–1844; 2nd Earl of Mountnorris, 9th Viscount Valentia, etc., 7th Baron Altham	Arthur Annesley; 1760–1841	William Annesley; 1772–1838; 3rd Earl Annesley, 4th Viscount Glerawly,etc.	Robert Annesley; 1773–1825
Arthur Annesley; 1803–1883	Arthur Annesley; 1785–1863; 10th Viscount of Valentia, etc.	James Annesley; 1799–1859
Arthur Annesley; 1809–1844	William Richard Annesley; 1830–1874; 4th Earl Annesley, 5th Viscount Glerawly, etc.	Hugh Annesley; 1831–1908; 5th Earl Annesley, 6th Viscount Glerawly, etc.	William Octavius Beresford Annesley; 1838–1875	Arthur Adolphus Annesley; 1833–1887
Baron Annesley of Bletchington, 1917
Henry Arthur Annesley; 1841–1924	George Annesley; 1853–1931	Arthur Annesley; 1843–1927; 11th Viscount of Valentia, etc., 1st Baron Annesley of Bletchington	Walter Annesley; 1861–1934; 7th Earl Annesley, 8th Viscount Glerawly, etc.	Arthur Albert Annesley; 1867–1947
William Monckton Annesley; 1875–1951; 13th Viscount of Valentia, etc.	Francis Dighton Annesley; 1888–1983; 14th Viscount of Valentia, etc.	Caryl Annesley; 1883–1949; 12th Viscount of Valentia, etc., 2nd Baron Annesley of Bletchington	Francis Annesley; 1884–1914; 6th Earl Annesley, 7th Viscount Glerawly, etc.	Beresford Annesley; 1894–1957; 8th Earl Annesley, 9th Viscount Glerawly, etc.	Robert Annesley; 1900–1979; 9th Earl Annesley, 10th Viscount Glerawly, etc.
Barony Annesley of Bletchington extinct, 1949
Richard John Dighton Annesley; 1929–2005; 15th Viscount of Valentia, etc.	Patrick Annesley; 1924–2001; 10th Earl Annesley, 11th Viscount Glerawly, etc.	Philip Annesley; 1927–2011; 11th Earl Annesley, 12th Viscount Glerawly, etc.	Michael Annesley b. 1933; 12th Earl Annesley, 13th Viscount Glerawly, etc.
Francis William Dighton Annesley b. 1959; 16th Viscount of Valentia, etc.	Peter John Annesley b. 1969	Michael Stephen Annesley b. 1957 styled Viscount Glerawly
Heir presumptive to the viscountcy of Valentia	Heir apparent to the Annesley earldom

== See also ==
- Earl of Anglesey
- Viscount Valentia
- Earl Annesley
