= Earl of Anglesey =

Defunct title in the Peerage of England

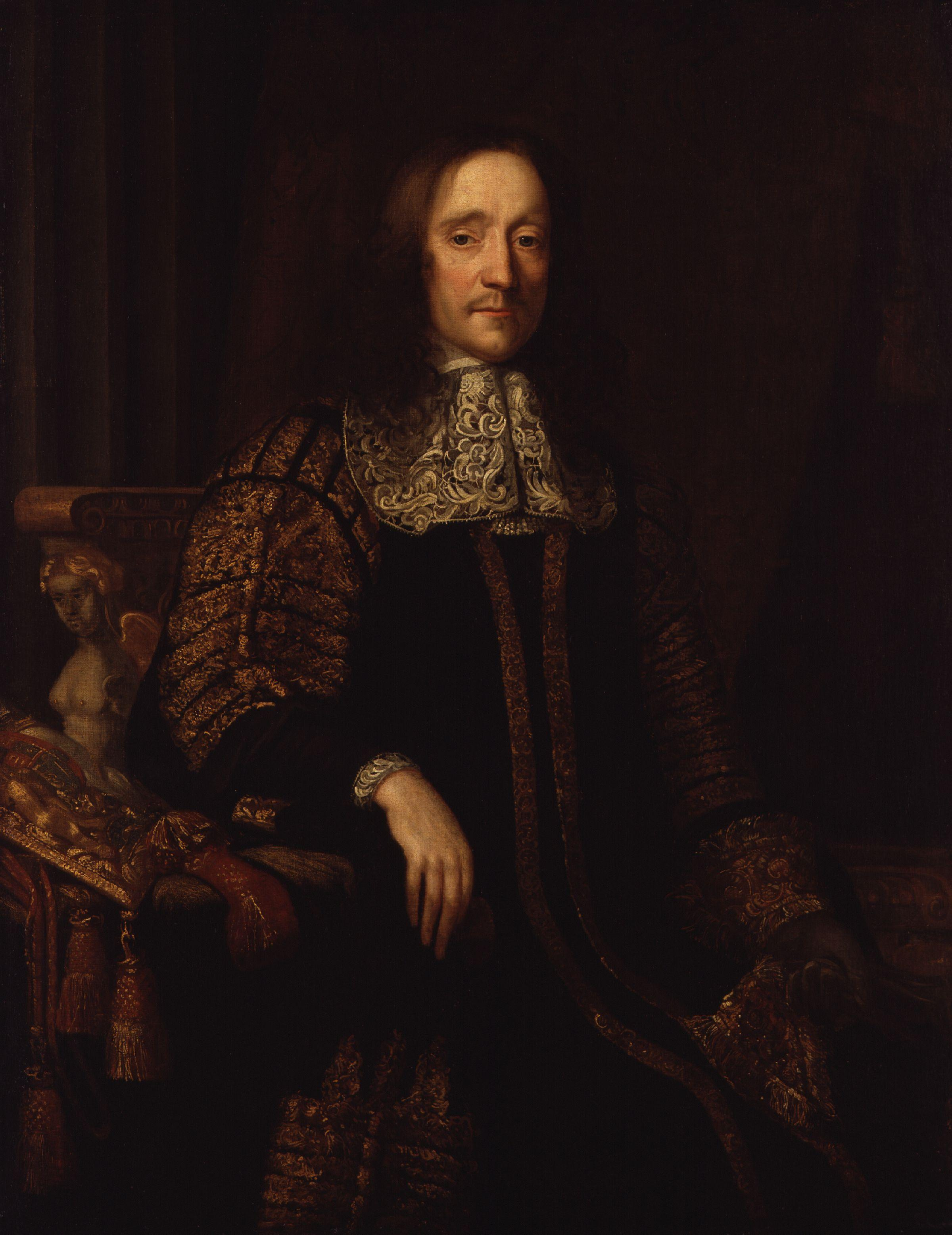
Arthur Annesley, 2nd Viscount Valentia was created Earl of Anglesey in 1661.

Earl of Anglesey was a title in the Peerage of England during the 17th and 18th centuries.

== History ==
The first creation came in 1623 when Christopher Villiers was created Earl of Anglesey, in Wales, as well as Baron Villiers. He was the elder brother of George Villiers, 1st Duke of Buckingham and the younger brother of John Villiers, 1st Viscount Purbeck. However, the Earldom and Barony became extinct on the death of his son, the second Earl, in 1661, who in 1644 had married Mary Bayning, the young widow of his cousin William Villiers, 2nd Viscount Grandison, becoming the step-father of her only child, Barbara Villiers.

The second creation came in 1661 when Arthur Annesley, 2nd Viscount Valentia, was created Earl of Anglesey, in Wales, and Baron Annesley, of Newport Pagnel in the County of Buckinghamshire. The titles were deemed extinct in 1761.

The wife of the Earl was normally given the title of Countess.

== Earls of Anglesey ==
Annesley arms

=== First creation (1623) ===
- Christopher Villiers, 1st Earl of Anglesey (d. 1630)
- Charles Villiers, 2nd Earl of Anglesey (d. 1661)

=== Second creation (1661) ===
- Arthur Annesley, 1st Earl of Anglesey (1614–1686)
- James Annesley, 2nd Earl of Anglesey (1645–1690)
- James Annesley, 3rd Earl of Anglesey (1670–1702)
- John Annesley, 4th Earl of Anglesey (died 1710)
- Arthur Annesley, 5th Earl of Anglesey (1678–1737)
- Richard Annesley, 6th Earl of Anglesey (1690–1761)

All but the last of these, and various other family members, are believed to be buried in the crypt of St Peter's Old Parish Church, Farnborough, Hampshire.

== Family tree ==
Annesley Family tree including the Earls of Anglesey, Earls Annesley, Earls of Mountnorris, Viscounts Glerawly , Viscounts Valentia and related titles

Viscount Valentia (1st creation), 1621	Baronet Annesley of Mountnorris, 1620; Baron Mountnorris, 1628; Viscount Valentia (2nd creation) as a reversionary grant, 1621 and then inherited, 1642
Henry Power d. 1642; 1st Viscount Valentia	Francis Annesley c. 1585 – 1660; 1st Viscount Valentia, etc.
Viscountcy Valentia (1st creation) passed to Francis Annesley
Earl of Anglesey (2nd creation) and Baron Annesley, 1661
Arthur Annesley; 1614–1686; 1st Earl of Anglesey, etc., 2nd Viscount Valentia, etc. m. Elizabeth Altham; 1620–1698	Francis Annesley b. 1628
Baron Altham, 1681
James Annesley c. 1645 – 1690; 2nd Earl of Anglesey, etc., 3rd Viscount Valentia, etc. m. Elizabeth Manners d. 1700	Frances Annesley d. 1705	Altham Annesley d. 1699; 1st Baron Altham	Richard Annesley d. 1701; 3rd Baron Altham	Francis Annesley; 1663–1750
Succession claims dubious	Baron Annesley, 1758; Viscount Glerawly, 1766
James Annesley; 1674–1702; 3rd Earl of Anglesey, etc., 4th Viscount Valentia, etc. m. Catherine Darnley c. 1681 – 1743	John Annesley; 1676–1710; 4th Earl of Anglesey, etc., 5th Viscount Valentia, etc. m. Henrietta Stanley; 1687–1714	Arthur Annesley c. 1678 – 1737; 5th Earl of Anglesey, etc., 6th Viscount Valentia, etc.	Mary Thompson d. 1719	James Annesley d. 1700; 2nd Baron Altham	Arthur Annesley; 1689–1727; 4th Baron Altham	Richard Annesley c. 1693 – 1761; 6th Earl of Anglesey, etc., 7th Viscount Valentia, etc., 5th Baron Altham m. Juliana Donovan d. 1777	Francis Annesley; 1701–1740	Martin Annesley; 1701–1749	William Annesley; 1710–1770; 1st Viscount Glerawly, etc.
Earldom of Anglesey deemed extinct, 1761
Earl of Mountnorris, 1793	Earl Annesley, 1789
Arthur Henry Annesley	James Annesley; 1715–1760	Dorothea Du Bois; 1728–1774	Arthur Annesley; 1744–1816; 1st Earl of Mountnorris, 8th Viscount Valentia, etc., 6th Baron Altham	Arthur Annesley; 1733–1773	Francis Annesley; 1740–1802; 1st Earl Annesley, 2nd Viscount Glerawly, etc.	Richard Annesley; 1745–1824; 2nd Earl Annesley, 3rd Viscount Glerawly, etc.
Arthur Henry Annesley; 1769–1845	George Annesley; 1770–1844; 2nd Earl of Mountnorris, 9th Viscount Valentia, etc., 7th Baron Altham	Arthur Annesley; 1760–1841	William Annesley; 1772–1838; 3rd Earl Annesley, 4th Viscount Glerawly,etc.	Robert Annesley; 1773–1825
Arthur Annesley; 1803–1883	Arthur Annesley; 1785–1863; 10th Viscount of Valentia, etc.	James Annesley; 1799–1859
Arthur Annesley; 1809–1844	William Richard Annesley; 1830–1874; 4th Earl Annesley, 5th Viscount Glerawly, etc.	Hugh Annesley; 1831–1908; 5th Earl Annesley, 6th Viscount Glerawly, etc.	William Octavius Beresford Annesley; 1838–1875	Arthur Adolphus Annesley; 1833–1887
Baron Annesley of Bletchington, 1917
Henry Arthur Annesley; 1841–1924	George Annesley; 1853–1931	Arthur Annesley; 1843–1927; 11th Viscount of Valentia, etc., 1st Baron Annesley of Bletchington	Walter Annesley; 1861–1934; 7th Earl Annesley, 8th Viscount Glerawly, etc.	Arthur Albert Annesley; 1867–1947
William Monckton Annesley; 1875–1951; 13th Viscount of Valentia, etc.	Francis Dighton Annesley; 1888–1983; 14th Viscount of Valentia, etc.	Caryl Annesley; 1883–1949; 12th Viscount of Valentia, etc., 2nd Baron Annesley of Bletchington	Francis Annesley; 1884–1914; 6th Earl Annesley, 7th Viscount Glerawly, etc.	Beresford Annesley; 1894–1957; 8th Earl Annesley, 9th Viscount Glerawly, etc.	Robert Annesley; 1900–1979; 9th Earl Annesley, 10th Viscount Glerawly, etc.
Barony Annesley of Bletchington extinct, 1949
Richard John Dighton Annesley; 1929–2005; 15th Viscount of Valentia, etc.	Patrick Annesley; 1924–2001; 10th Earl Annesley, 11th Viscount Glerawly, etc.	Philip Annesley; 1927–2011; 11th Earl Annesley, 12th Viscount Glerawly, etc.	Michael Annesley b. 1933; 12th Earl Annesley, 13th Viscount Glerawly, etc.
Francis William Dighton Annesley b. 1959; 16th Viscount of Valentia, etc.	Peter John Annesley b. 1969	Michael Stephen Annesley b. 1957 styled Viscount Glerawly
Heir presumptive to the viscountcy of Valentia	Heir apparent to the Annesley earldom

== See also ==
- Duke of Buckingham
