= Earl Annesley =

Title in the peerage of Ireland

Earldom of Annesley
- Arms: Paly of six Argent and Azure, over all a Bend Gules. Crest: A Moor's Head couped at the shoulders in profile proper, wreathed about the temples Argent and Azure. Supporters: Dexter: a Roman Knight in armour Or, short sleeves and apron Azure, face arms and legs bare, the latter sandalled Or, on his head a Helmet (or Cap) Gold, on top thereof three Feathers Argent and Azure, in his exterior hand an Antique Shield proper. Sinister: A Moorish Prince in armour Or, short sleeves and apron Azure, face neck arms and legs proper, on the latter Boots Gold, behind him a Sheaf of Arrows proper, fastened by a Pink Ribbon, wreathed about the temples Argent and Azure, in his exterior hand a Bow proper.
- Creation date: 17 August 1789
- Created by: King George III
- Peerage: Peerage of Ireland
- First holder: Francis Annesley 2nd Viscount Glerawly
- Present holder: Michael Annesley, 12th Earl Annesley
- Heir apparent: Michael Annesley, Viscount Glerawly
- Remainder to: the 1st Earl's heirs male of the body lawfully begotten, with special remainder, failing male heirs of his body, to his brother, Hon Richard Annesley, in like manner.
- Subsidiary titles: Viscount Glerawly; Baron Annesley
- Status: Extant
- Former seat: Castlewellan Moorish Tower
- Motto: VIRTUTIS AMORE (By love of virtue)

Earl Annesley, of Castlewellan in the County of Down, is a title in the Peerage of Ireland. It was created on 17 August 1789 for Francis Annesley, 2nd Viscount Glerawly, with special remainder to his younger brother the Honourable Richard Annesley. He had previously represented Downpatrick in the Irish House of Commons. The titles of Baron Annesley, of Castlewellan in the County of Down, and Viscount Glerawly, in the County of Fermanagh, were created in the Peerage of Ireland on 20 September 1758 and 14 November 1766 respectively for his father William Annesley, who sat as Member of the Irish Parliament for Midleton. Annesley was the sixth son of the Honourable Francis Annesley, fourth son of Francis Annesley, 1st Viscount Valentia.

The first Earl Annesley had several illegitimate children but no legitimate issue. He was succeeded (in the earldom according to the special remainder) by his younger brother, the second Earl. He had earlier represented seven different constituencies in the Irish Parliament and served as a Commissioner of Customs for Ireland. His eldest son, the third Earl, sat in the British House of Commons as the representative for Downpatrick. On his death the titles passed to his eldest son, the fourth Earl. He sat as Conservative Member of Parliament for Great Grimsby and was an Irish representative peer in the House of Lords from 1857 to 1874.

He never married and was succeeded by his younger brother, the fifth Earl. He was a soldier and also represented County Cavan in Parliament as a Conservative. Between 1877 and 1908 he sat in the House of Lords as an Irish Representative Peer. His line of the family failed on the death of his only son, the sixth Earl, who was killed during the First World War. During his life in 1884 the Earl had a property named the 'Moorish tower' constructed, only for it to become ruin before a century later. The late Earl was succeeded by his first cousin, the seventh Earl. He was the son of the Hon. William Octavius Beresford Annesley, sixth son of the third Earl. This line of the family failed in 1957 on the death of his son, the eighth Earl. He was succeeded by his third cousin once removed, the ninth Earl. He was the great-great-grandson of the Hon. Robert Annesley, second son of the second Earl. As of 2014 the titles are held by the ninth Earl's third son, the twelfth Earl, who succeeded his elder brother in 2011.

== Viscounts Glerawly (1766) ==
- William Annesley, 1st Viscount Glerawly (c. 1710–1770)
- Francis Charles Annesley, 2nd Viscount Glerawly (1740–1802) (created Earl Annesley in 1789)

== Earls Annesley (1789) ==
- Francis Charles Annesley, 1st Earl Annesley (1740–1802)
- Richard Annesley, 2nd Earl Annesley (1745–1824)
- William Richard Annesley, 3rd Earl Annesley (1772–1838)
- William Richard Annesley, 4th Earl Annesley (1830–1874)
- Hugh Annesley, 5th Earl Annesley (1831–1908)
- Francis Annesley, 6th Earl Annesley (1884–1914)
- Walter Beresford Annesley, 7th Earl Annesley (1861–1934)
- Beresford Cecil Bingham Annesley, 8th Earl Annesley (1894–1957)
- Robert Annesley, 9th Earl Annesley (1900–1979)
- Patrick Annesley, 10th Earl Annesley (1924–2001)
- Philip Harrison Annesley, 11th Earl Annesley (1927–2011)
- Michael Robert Annesley, 12th Earl Annesley (born 1933)

== Present peer ==
Michael Robert Annesley, 12th Earl Annesley (born 4 December 1933), is the third son of the 9th Earl and his wife Nora Harrison. He was educated at Strode's Grammar School, Egham, Surrey. In 1949 he joined the Royal Air Force as an airman and in 1968 was a warrant officer. On 23 June 1956 he married Audrey Mary Goodwright, daughter of Ernest Stanley Goodwright. In 1997 he became a Fellow of the International Association of Book-Keepers. In 1999 his address was 16 Coltash Road, Furnace Green, Crawley, West Sussex. On 11 March 2011 he succeeded his brother as Earl Annesley, Viscount Glerawly, and Baron Annesley, all in the peerage of Ireland. He has three children:

- Michael Stephen Annesley, Viscount Glerawly (born 1957), heir apparent
- Lady Sheila Marie Annesley (born 1961)
- Robert Francis Annesley (born 1962)

== Family tree and Line of succession ==
Annesley Family tree including the Earls of Anglesey, Earls Annesley, Earls of Mountnorris, Viscounts Glerawly , Viscounts Valentia and related titles

Viscount Valentia (1st creation), 1621 | Baronet Annesley of Mountnorris, 1620; Baron Mountnorris, 1628; Viscount Valentia (2nd creation) as a reversionary grant, 1621 and then inherited, 1642
Henry Power d. 1642; 1st Viscount Valentia | Power and Annesley were distantly related | Francis Annesley c. 1585 – 1660; 1st Viscount Valentia, etc.
Viscountcy Valentia (1st creation) passed to Francis Annesley
Earl of Anglesey (2nd creation) and Baron Annesley, 1661
Arthur Annesley; 1614–1686; 1st Earl of Anglesey, etc., 2nd Viscount Valentia, etc. m. Elizabeth Altham; 1620–1698 | Francis Annesley b. 1628
Baron Altham, 1681
James Annesley c. 1645 – 1690; 2nd Earl of Anglesey, etc., 3rd Viscount Valentia, etc. m. Elizabeth Manners d. 1700 | Frances Annesley d. 1705 | Altham Annesley d. 1699; 1st Baron Altham | Richard Annesley d. 1701; 3rd Baron Altham | Francis Annesley; 1663–1750
Succession claims dubious | Baron Annesley, 1758; Viscount Glerawly, 1766
James Annesley; 1674–1702; 3rd Earl of Anglesey, etc., 4th Viscount Valentia, etc. m. Catherine Darnley c. 1681 – 1743 | John Annesley; 1676–1710; 4th Earl of Anglesey, etc., 5th Viscount Valentia, etc. m. Henrietta Stanley; 1687–1714 | Arthur Annesley c. 1678 – 1737; 5th Earl of Anglesey, etc., 6th Viscount Valentia, etc. | Mary Thompson d. 1719 | James Annesley d. 1700; 2nd Baron Altham | Arthur Annesley; 1689–1727; 4th Baron Altham | Richard Annesley c. 1693 – 1761; 6th Earl of Anglesey, etc., 7th Viscount Valentia, etc., 5th Baron Altham m. Juliana Donovan d. 1777 | Francis Annesley; 1701–1740 | Martin Annesley; 1701–1749 | William Annesley; 1710–1770; 1st Viscount Glerawly, etc.
Earldom of Anglesey deemed extinct, 1761
Earl of Mountnorris, 1793 | Earl Annesley, 1789
Arthur Henry Annesley | James Annesley; 1715–1760 | Dorothea Du Bois; 1728–1774 | Arthur Annesley; 1744–1816; 1st Earl of Mountnorris, 8th Viscount Valentia, etc., 6th Baron Altham | Arthur Annesley; 1733–1773 | Francis Annesley; 1740–1802; 1st Earl Annesley, 2nd Viscount Glerawly, etc. | Richard Annesley; 1745–1824; 2nd Earl Annesley, 3rd Viscount Glerawly, etc.
Arthur Henry Annesley; 1769–1845 | George Annesley; 1770–1844; 2nd Earl of Mountnorris, 9th Viscount Valentia, etc., 7th Baron Altham | Arthur Annesley; 1760–1841 | William Annesley; 1772–1838; 3rd Earl Annesley, 4th Viscount Glerawly,etc. | Robert Annesley; 1773–1825
Earldom of Mountnorris and barony Altham extinct, 1844
Arthur Annesley; 1803–1883 | Arthur Annesley; 1785–1863; 10th Viscount of Valentia, etc. | James Annesley; 1799–1859
Arthur Annesley; 1809–1844 | William Richard Annesley; 1830–1874; 4th Earl Annesley, 5th Viscount Glerawly, etc. | Hugh Annesley; 1831–1908; 5th Earl Annesley, 6th Viscount Glerawly, etc. | William Octavius Beresford Annesley; 1838–1875 | Arthur Adolphus Annesley; 1833–1887
Baron Annesley of Bletchington, 1917
Henry Arthur Annesley; 1841–1924 | George Annesley; 1853–1931 | Arthur Annesley; 1843–1927; 11th Viscount of Valentia, etc., 1st Baron Annesley of Bletchington | Walter Annesley; 1861–1934; 7th Earl Annesley, 8th Viscount Glerawly, etc. | Arthur Albert Annesley; 1867–1947
William Monckton Annesley; 1875–1951; 13th Viscount of Valentia, etc. | Francis Dighton Annesley; 1888–1983; 14th Viscount of Valentia, etc. | Caryl Annesley; 1883–1949; 12th Viscount of Valentia, etc., 2nd Baron Annesley of Bletchington | Francis Annesley; 1884–1914; 6th Earl Annesley, 7th Viscount Glerawly, etc. | Beresford Annesley; 1894–1957; 8th Earl Annesley, 9th Viscount Glerawly, etc. | Robert Annesley; 1900–1979; 9th Earl Annesley, 10th Viscount Glerawly, etc.
Barony Annesley of Bletchington extinct, 1949
Richard John Dighton Annesley; 1929–2005; 15th Viscount of Valentia, etc. | Patrick Annesley; 1924–2001; 10th Earl Annesley, 11th Viscount Glerawly, etc. | Philip Annesley; 1927–2011; 11th Earl Annesley, 12th Viscount Glerawly, etc. | Michael Annesley b. 1933; 12th Earl Annesley, 13th Viscount Glerawly, etc.
Francis William Dighton Annesley b. 1959; 16th Viscount of Valentia, etc. | Peter John Annesley b. 1969 | Michael Stephen Annesley b. 1957 styled Viscount Glerawly
Heir presumptive to the viscountcy of Valentia | Heir apparent to the Annesley earldom

Line of succession
- Richard Annesley, 2nd Earl Annesley (1745–1824)
  - William Annesley, 3rd Earl Annesley (1772–1838)
    - William Annesley, 4th Earl Annesley (1830–1874)
    - Hugh Annesley, 5th Earl Annesley (1831–1908)
      - Francis Annesley, 6th Earl Annesley (1884–1914)
    - Hon. William Octavius Beresford Annesley (1838–1875)
      - Walter Annesley, 7th Earl Annesley (1861–1934)
        - Beresford Annesley, 8th Earl Annesley (1894–1957)
  - Hon. Robert Annesley (1773–1825)
    - James Annesley (1799–1859)
      - Arthur Adolphus Annesley (1833–1887)
        - Arthur Albert O'Donel Valentia Annesley (1867–1947)
          - Robert Annesley, 9th Earl Annesley (1900–1979)
            - Patrick Annesley, 10th Earl Annesley (1924–2001)
            - Philip Annesley, 11th Earl Annesley (1927–2011)
            - Michael Annesley, 12th Earl Annesley (b. 1933)
              - (1). Michael Stephen Annesley, Viscount Glerawly (b. 1957)
                - (2). Michael David Annesley (b. 1984)
                  - (3). Kenzie Michael Annesley (b. 2014)
              - (4). Robert Francis Annesley (b. 1962)
  - Hon. Arthur Grove Annesley (1774–1849)
    - Richard Grove Annesley (1815–1892)
      - Richard Arthur Grove Annesley (1879–1966)
        - Richard Francis Michael Grove Annesley (1908–1979)
          - male issue and descendants in remainder
  - Francis Charles Annesley (1775–1832)
    - William Henry Annesley (1830–1875)
      - William Robert Ewart Annesley (1872–1914)
        - William Alan Cecil Annesley (1907–1976)
          - desc.

== See also ==
- Viscount Valentia
