= Viscount Valentia =

Title in the peerage of Ireland

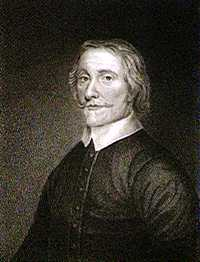
Francis Annesley, 1st Viscount Valentia

Viscount Valentia is a title in the Peerage of Ireland. It has been created twice. The first creation came in 1621 for Henry Power. A year later, his kinsman Sir Francis Annesley, 1st Baronet, was given a "reversionary grant" of the viscountcy, which stated that on Power's death Annesley would be created Viscount Valentia. Annesley, a member of an influential Anglo-Irish family which descended from Newport Pagnell in the County of Buckinghamshire, was a favourite of James I, who granted him land in Ireland, notably the fort of Mountnorris in County Armagh. He was knighted in 1616, created a baronet, of Newport Pagnell in the County of Buckingham, in the Baronetage of Ireland in 1620 and Baron Mountnorris, of Mountnorris in the County of Armagh, in 1628.

In 1642, on the death of Power, he became Viscount Valentia according to the reversionary grant given in 1622. Valentia's fourth son Hon. Francis Annesley was the grandfather of William, 1st Viscount Glerawly (3rd son of his father), from whom the Earls Annesley descend. Valentia's eldest son and successor, Arthur, the second Viscount, was created Baron Annesley, of Newport Pagnel in the County of Buckingham, and Earl of Anglesey, in Wales, in the Peerage of England, in 1661. Anglesey's younger son Altham Annesley was created Baron Altham in the Peerage of Ireland on 14 February 1681.

On the death of the fifth Earl of Anglesey in 1737, the line of the eldest son of the first Earl failed. He was succeeded by his kinsman Richard Annesley, 5th Baron Altham (only surviving son of Richard, 3rd Baron Altham, 3rd son of the first Earl), who became the sixth Earl and seventh Viscount Valentia. However, after his assumption of the Earldom an extraordinary legal battle developed. A Mr James Annesley claimed the earldom and its subsidiary titles as the son of Arthur Annesley, fourth Baron Altham. He alleged that in 1728 he had been removed to an obscure school and that his death had subsequently been announced by his uncle, Richard, the sixth Earl of Anglesey. James was later to have been sold to an American planter as a slave by his uncle. He subsequently escaped to Jamaica and in September 1740 he made his way back to England.

On 11 November 1743, he took action against his uncle to eject him as Baron Altham and to retain his property. Richard's defence was that James was not the legitimate son of Mary, second wife of the fourth Baron Altham, but actually the illegitimate son of a Joan Landy. The verdict was in James' favour, with his uncle being convicted of claiming he was dead and selling him into slavery so that he could take up the title and estates. James' estates were returned to him but he never took up his titles before his death in 1760 and his uncle continued to be recognised as Earl until he died in 1761.

In 1761, on the death of the sixth Earl, the story took a new twist. His son and heir, Arthur, assumed the titles as the "seventh Earl of Anglesey". However, Arthur's legitimacy was disputed, and on 22 April 1771, the British House of Lords decided that his claim to the English titles of Baron Annesley and Earl of Anglesey were invalid and that they had become extinct upon his father's death. However, his claims to the baronetcy of Newport-Pagnell, the baronies of Mountnorris and Altham and the viscountcy of Valentia were twice confirmed by the Irish House of Lords. In 1793 he was compensated when he was created Earl of Mountnorris in the Peerage of Ireland. On the death of his son, the 2nd Earl, the earldom and barony of Altham became extinct, while he was succeeded in the baronetcy, barony of Mountnorris and viscountcy of Valentia by his distant relative, Arthur Annesley, who became the 10th Viscount Valentia. He was fifth in descent from the Honourable Francis Annesley, fourth son of the 1st Viscount, his great-grandfather Francis Annesley having been the elder brother of the first Viscount Glerawly referred to above.

The 11th Viscount, was created Baron Annesley of Bletchington, in the County of Oxford, in the Peerage of the United Kingdom on 7 May 1917. However, this title became extinct on the death of his son, the 12th Viscount, in 1949. The Irish titles were inherited by his distant relative Reverend William Monckton Annesley, who became the 13th Viscount Valentia. He was also a descendant of Hon. Francis Annesley, fourth son of the first Viscount. He was succeeded by his cousin Francis Dighton Annesley, who established his claim to the titles in 1959 and became the 14th Viscount Valentia. He was the son of George Dighton Annesley, uncle of the 13th Viscount.

On the 14th Viscount's death in 1983 the titles passed to his son, Richard John Dighton Annesley. He was a Captain in the British Army, then farmed in Zimbabwe and returned to Britain in the early 1980s. As 2014 the titles are held by his son, the 16th Viscount, who succeeded in 2005. Lord Valentia is also the Premier Baronet of Ireland.

The present Viscount has not successfully proven his succession to the baronetcy and is therefore not on the Official Roll of the Baronetage, with the baronetcy considered dormant since 2005, as of 31 December 2013.

== Viscount Valentia, first creation (1621) ==
- Henry Power, 1st Viscount Valentia (died 1642)

== Viscount Valentia, second creation (1622; took effect 1642) ==
- Francis Annesley, 1st Viscount Valentia (1583–1660)
- Arthur Annesley, 2nd Viscount Valentia (1614–1686) (created Earl of Anglesey in 1661)

=== Earl of Anglesey (1661) ===
- Arthur Annesley, 1st Earl of Anglesey (1614–1686)
- James Annesley, 2nd Earl of Anglesey (1645–1690)
- James Annesley, 3rd Earl of Anglesey (1674–1702)
- John Annesley, 4th Earl of Anglesey (1676–1710)
- Arthur Annesley, 5th Earl of Anglesey (d. 1737)
- Richard Annesley, 6th Earl of Anglesey (1690–1761)

=== Viscount Valentia, second creation (1622; reverted) ===
- Arthur Annesley, 8th Viscount Valentia (1744–1816) (created Earl of Mountnorris in 1793)

=== Earl of Mountnorris (1793) ===
- Arthur Annesley, 1st Earl of Mountnorris (1744–1816)
- George Annesley, 2nd Earl of Mountnorris (1770–1844)

=== Viscounts Valentia, second creation (1622; reverted) ===
- Arthur Annesley, 10th Viscount Valentia (1785–1863)
- Arthur Annesley, 11th Viscount Valentia (1843–1927)
- Caryl Arthur Annesley, 12th Viscount Valentia (1883–1949)
- William Monckton Annesley, 13th Viscount Valentia (1875–1951)
- Francis Dighton Annesley, 14th Viscount Valentia (1888–1983)
- Richard John Dighton Annesley, 15th Viscount Valentia (1929–2005)
- Francis William Dighton Annesley, 16th Viscount Valentia (born 1959)

The heir presumptive is the present holder's brother, the Hon. Peter John Annesley (born 1967).
The heir presumptive's heir apparent is his son, William Lester Dighton Annesley (born 1999).

== Family tree ==
Annesley Family tree including the Earls of Anglesey, Earls Annesley, Earls of Mountnorris, Viscounts Glerawly , Viscounts Valentia and related titles

Viscount Valentia (1st creation), 1621	Baronet Annesley of Mountnorris, 1620; Baron Mountnorris, 1628; Viscount Valentia (2nd creation) as a reversionary grant, 1621 and then inherited, 1642
Henry Power d. 1642; 1st Viscount Valentia	Francis Annesley c. 1585 – 1660; 1st Viscount Valentia, etc.
Viscountcy Valentia (1st creation) passed to Francis Annesley
Earl of Anglesey (2nd creation) and Baron Annesley, 1661
Arthur Annesley; 1614–1686; 1st Earl of Anglesey, etc., 2nd Viscount Valentia, etc. m. Elizabeth Altham; 1620–1698	Francis Annesley b. 1628
Baron Altham, 1681
James Annesley c. 1645 – 1690; 2nd Earl of Anglesey, etc., 3rd Viscount Valentia, etc. m. Elizabeth Manners d. 1700	Frances Annesley d. 1705	Altham Annesley d. 1699; 1st Baron Altham	Richard Annesley d. 1701; 3rd Baron Altham	Francis Annesley; 1663–1750
Succession claims dubious	Baron Annesley, 1758; Viscount Glerawly, 1766
James Annesley; 1674–1702; 3rd Earl of Anglesey, etc., 4th Viscount Valentia, etc. m. Catherine Darnley c. 1681 – 1743	John Annesley; 1676–1710; 4th Earl of Anglesey, etc., 5th Viscount Valentia, etc. m. Henrietta Stanley; 1687–1714	Arthur Annesley c. 1678 – 1737; 5th Earl of Anglesey, etc., 6th Viscount Valentia, etc.	Mary Thompson d. 1719	James Annesley d. 1700; 2nd Baron Altham	Arthur Annesley; 1689–1727; 4th Baron Altham	Richard Annesley c. 1693 – 1761; 6th Earl of Anglesey, etc., 7th Viscount Valentia, etc., 5th Baron Altham m. Juliana Donovan d. 1777	Francis Annesley; 1701–1740	Martin Annesley; 1701–1749	William Annesley; 1710–1770; 1st Viscount Glerawly, etc.
Earldom of Anglesey deemed extinct, 1761
Earl of Mountnorris, 1793	Earl Annesley, 1789
Arthur Henry Annesley	James Annesley; 1715–1760	Dorothea Du Bois; 1728–1774	Arthur Annesley; 1744–1816; 1st Earl of Mountnorris, 8th Viscount Valentia, etc., 6th Baron Altham	Arthur Annesley; 1733–1773	Francis Annesley; 1740–1802; 1st Earl Annesley, 2nd Viscount Glerawly, etc.	Richard Annesley; 1745–1824; 2nd Earl Annesley, 3rd Viscount Glerawly, etc.
Arthur Henry Annesley; 1769–1845	George Annesley; 1770–1844; 2nd Earl of Mountnorris, 9th Viscount Valentia, etc., 7th Baron Altham	Arthur Annesley; 1760–1841	William Annesley; 1772–1838; 3rd Earl Annesley, 4th Viscount Glerawly,etc.	Robert Annesley; 1773–1825
Arthur Annesley; 1803–1883	Arthur Annesley; 1785–1863; 10th Viscount of Valentia, etc.	James Annesley; 1799–1859
Arthur Annesley; 1809–1844	William Richard Annesley; 1830–1874; 4th Earl Annesley, 5th Viscount Glerawly, etc.	Hugh Annesley; 1831–1908; 5th Earl Annesley, 6th Viscount Glerawly, etc.	William Octavius Beresford Annesley; 1838–1875	Arthur Adolphus Annesley; 1833–1887
Baron Annesley of Bletchington, 1917
Henry Arthur Annesley; 1841–1924	George Annesley; 1853–1931	Arthur Annesley; 1843–1927; 11th Viscount of Valentia, etc., 1st Baron Annesley of Bletchington	Walter Annesley; 1861–1934; 7th Earl Annesley, 8th Viscount Glerawly, etc.	Arthur Albert Annesley; 1867–1947
William Monckton Annesley; 1875–1951; 13th Viscount of Valentia, etc.	Francis Dighton Annesley; 1888–1983; 14th Viscount of Valentia, etc.	Caryl Annesley; 1883–1949; 12th Viscount of Valentia, etc., 2nd Baron Annesley of Bletchington	Francis Annesley; 1884–1914; 6th Earl Annesley, 7th Viscount Glerawly, etc.	Beresford Annesley; 1894–1957; 8th Earl Annesley, 9th Viscount Glerawly, etc.	Robert Annesley; 1900–1979; 9th Earl Annesley, 10th Viscount Glerawly, etc.
Barony Annesley of Bletchington extinct, 1949
Richard John Dighton Annesley; 1929–2005; 15th Viscount of Valentia, etc.	Patrick Annesley; 1924–2001; 10th Earl Annesley, 11th Viscount Glerawly, etc.	Philip Annesley; 1927–2011; 11th Earl Annesley, 12th Viscount Glerawly, etc.	Michael Annesley b. 1933; 12th Earl Annesley, 13th Viscount Glerawly, etc.
Francis William Dighton Annesley b. 1959; 16th Viscount of Valentia, etc.	Peter John Annesley b. 1969	Michael Stephen Annesley b. 1957 styled Viscount Glerawly
Heir presumptive to the viscountcy of Valentia	Heir apparent to the Annesley earldom

== See also ==
- Baron Altham
- Earl of Anglesey
- Earl Annesley
- Donald McCarthy, 1st Earl of Clancare (d.1601), whose son Teige was styled "Lord Valentia"

== Sources ==
- Kidd, Charles (1903). Debrett's peerage, baronetage, knightage, and companionage. London: London: Dean & son, limited. p. 861. Archived from the original on 7 November 2021. "John Debrett"
- Kidd, Charles, Williamson, David (eds). Debrett's Peerage and Baronetage (1990 edition). New York: St Martin's Press, 1990.
