= Arthur Annesley, 1st Earl of Anglesey =

Anglo-Irish royalist statesman (1614–1686)

The Right Honourable The Earl of Anglesey PC
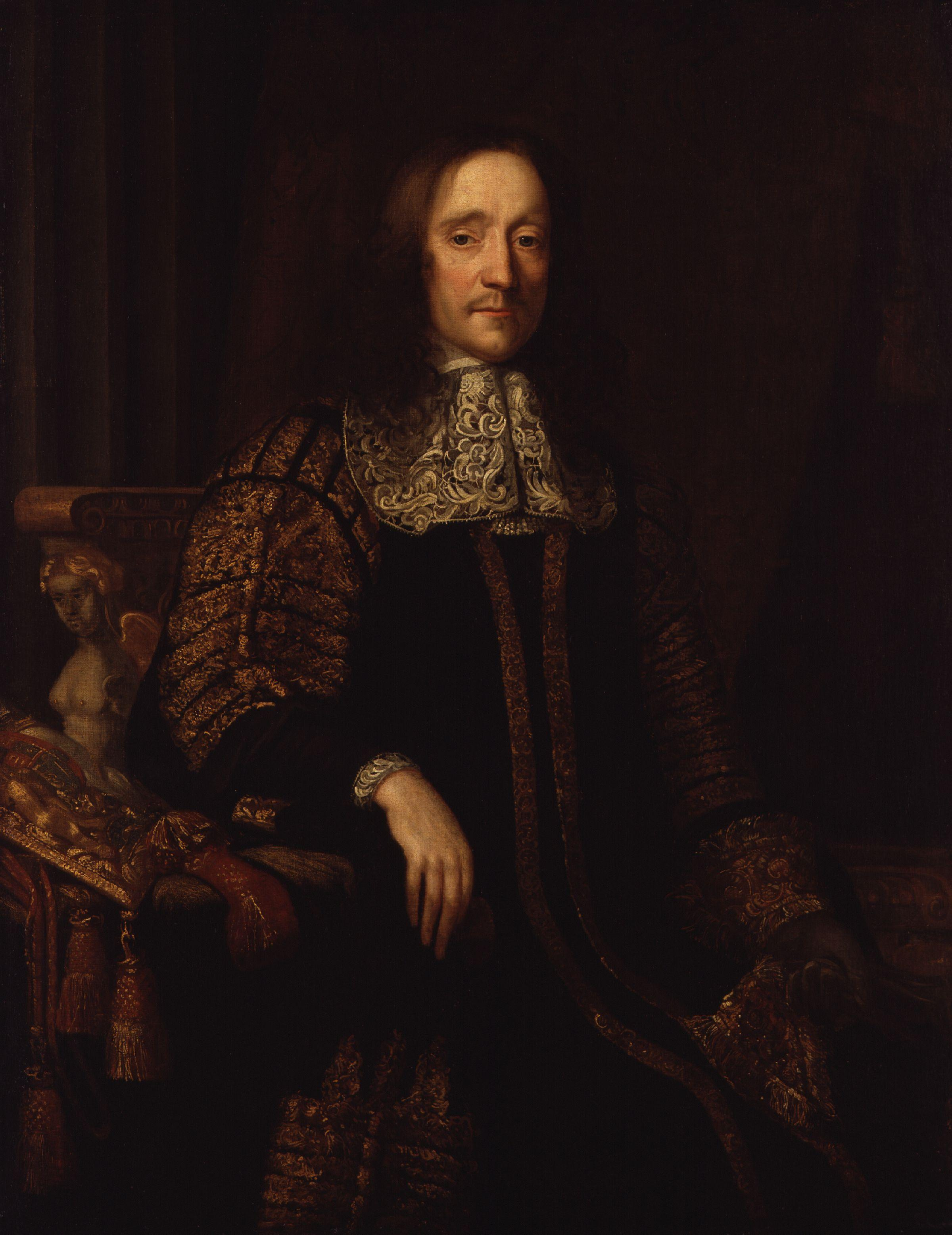
- Lord Anglesey, by John Michael Wright

Lord Privy Seal
- In office April 1673 – 9 August 1682
- Preceded by: John Robartes, Lord Robartes
- Succeeded by: George Savile, Marquess of Halifax

Treasurer of the Navy
- In office 28 June 1667 – 11 November 1668
- Preceded by: Sir George Carteret
- Succeeded by: Sir Thomas Osborne and Sir Thomas de Littleton

President of the Council of State
- In office 23 February 1660 – 28 May 1660
- Preceded by: Bulstrode Whitelocke
- Succeeded by: position abolished (Council of State dissolved)

Personal details
- Born: 10 July 1614 Dublin, Kingdom of Ireland
- Died: 6 April 1686 (aged 71) London, Kingdom of England
- Resting place: Farnborough, Hampshire, England
- Education: Magdalen College, Oxford
- Occupation: Anglo-Irish royalist statesman

Arthur Annesley, 1st Earl of Anglesey, PC (10 July 1614 – 6 April 1686) was an Anglo-Irish royalist statesman. After short periods as President of the Council of State and Treasurer of the Navy, he served as Lord Privy Seal between 1673 and 1682 for Charles II. He succeeded his father as 2nd Viscount Valentia in 1660, and he was created Earl of Anglesey in 1661.

== Early life ==
Annesley was born in Dublin, Ireland, to Francis Annesley, 1st Viscount Valentia, and his first wife Dorothy, daughter of Sir John Philipps, Bt, of Picton Castle. He was educated at Magdalen College, Oxford, from which he graduated in 1634 as a Bachelor of Arts; that year, he was admitted into Lincoln's Inn. Having made the grand tour he returned to Ireland; and being employed by Parliament on a mission to the Duke of Ormonde, now reduced to the last extremities, he succeeded in concluding a treaty with him on 19 June 1647, thus securing the country from complete subjection to the rebels. In April 1647 he was returned for Radnorshire to the House of Commons.

He supported the parliamentarians against the republican or army party, and may have been one of the members excluded in Pride's Purge during 1648, though some sources claim he wasn't. As a moderate and a presbyterian, he was highly sceptical of the army's decisions towards the end of the war. He did support Oliver Cromwell however, though at this time Cromwell wasn't as powerful as he would later become as Lord Protector, as the New Model Army was under the command of Lord Fairfax. His loyalty to Cromwell may have allowed him to retain his seat in parliament after the events of 1648. He sat in Richard Cromwell's parliament as Member of Parliament for Dublin City, and endeavoured to take his seat in the restored Rump Parliament of 1659. He was made President of the Council of State in February 1660, and in the Convention Parliament sat for Carmarthen. The anarchy of the last months of The Protectorate converted him to royalism, and he showed great activity in bringing about the English Restoration. He used his influence in moderating measures of revenge and violence, and while sitting in judgement on the regicides was on the side of leniency. He was sworn of the Privy Council on 1 June and in November he succeeded his father as Viscount Valentia in the Irish peerage. On 20 April 1661, he was created Baron Annesley, of Newport Pagnell in Buckinghamshire and Earl of Anglesey in the Peerage of England.

Anglesey supported the king's administration in parliament, but opposed strongly the unjust measure which, on the abolition of the Court of Wards and Liveries, placed the extra burden of taxation thus rendered necessary on the Excise. His services in the administration of Ireland were especially valuable. He filled the office of Vice-Treasurer from 1660 till 1667, served on the committee for carrying out the declaration for the settlement of Ireland and on the committee for Irish affairs, while later, in 1671 and 1672, he was a leading member of various commissions appointed to investigate the working of the Acts of Settlement. In February 1661 he had obtained a captaincy of horse, and in 1667 he exchanged his post of Vice-Treasurer of Ireland with Sir George Carteret for that of Treasurer of the Navy.

He was elected as a Bailiff to the board of the Bedford Level Corporation in 1664 and again in 1679, a position he then held until his death.

== Later years ==
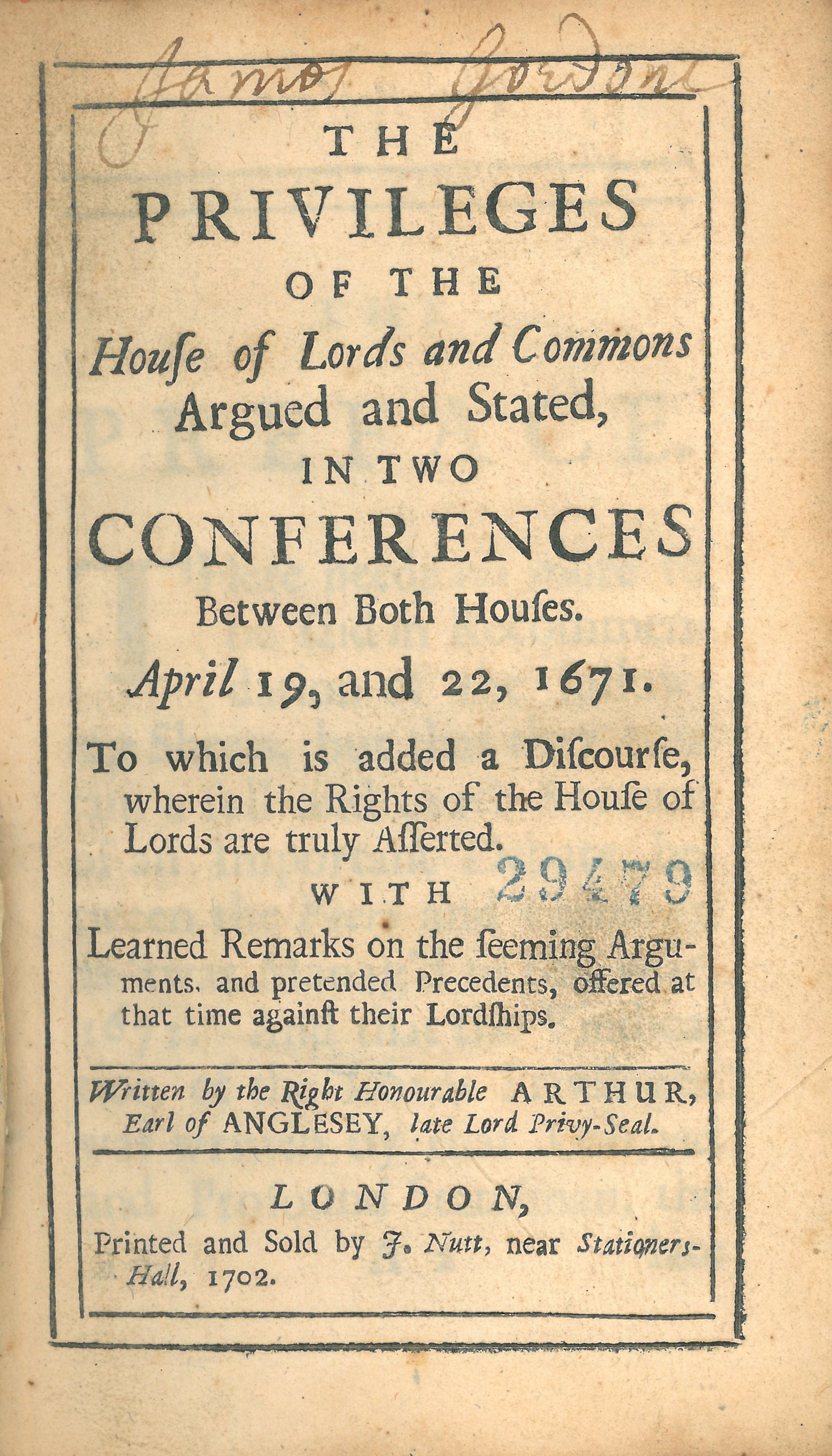
The title page of Anglesey's pamphlet The Privileges of the House of Lords and Commons (1702).

His public career was marked by great independence and fidelity to principle. On 24 July 1663, he alone signed a protest against the Act for the Encouragement of Trade, on the plea that owing to the free export of coin and bullion allowed by the act, and to the importation of foreign commodities being greater than the export of home goods, "it must necessarily follow ... that our silver will also be carried away into foreign parts and all trade fail for want of money." He especially disapproved of another clause in the same bill forbidding the importation of Irish cattle into England, a mischievous measure promoted by the Duke of Buckingham, and he opposed again the bill brought in with that object in January 1667, though without success. This same year his naval accounts were subjected to an examination in consequence of his indignant refusal to take part in the attack upon Ormonde; and he was suspended from his office in 1668, no charge, however, against him being substantiated. He took a prominent part in the dispute in 1671 between the two Houses concerning the right of the Lords to amend money bills, and wrote a learned pamphlet on the question entitled The Privileges of the House of Lords and Commons (1702), in which the right of the Lords was asserted. In April 1673, he was appointed Lord Privy Seal, and was disappointed at not obtaining the Great Seal the same year on the removal of Lord Shaftesbury.

In the bitter religious controversies of the time, Anglesey showed great moderation and toleration. In 1674 he is mentioned as endeavouring to prevent the justices from putting into force the laws against the Roman Catholics and Nonconformists. In the panic of the "Popish Plot" in 1678 he exhibited a saner judgment than most of his contemporaries and conspicuous courage. On 6 December he protested with three other peers against the measure sent up from the Commons enforcing the disarming of all convicted recusants and taking bail from them to keep the peace; he was the only peer to dissent from the motion declaring the existence of an Irish plot; and though believing in the guilt and voting for the death of Lord Stafford, he interceded, according to his own account, with the king for him as well as for the barrister Richard Langhorne and Oliver Plunkett, Roman Catholic Archbishop of Armagh and Primate of All Ireland.

His independent attitude drew upon him an attack by the notorious informer Dangerfield, and in the Commons by the Attorney General, Sir William Jones, who accused him of endeavouring to stifle the evidence against the Romanists. In March 1679 he protested against the second reading of the bill for disabling the Earl of Danby.

In 1681, Anglesey wrote A Letter from a Person of Honour in the Country, as a rejoinder to the Earl of Castlehaven, who had published memoirs on the Irish rebellion defending the action of the Irish and the Roman Catholics. In so doing Anglesey was held by Ormonde to have censured his conduct and that of Charles I in concluding the "Cessation", and the duke brought the matter before the council. Anglesey was by now disillusioned about the efficacy of the council, complaining bitterly that Councillors were kept in ignorance of what passed between the King and the Secretaries of State. In 1682 he wrote The Account of Arthur, Earl of Anglesey ... of the true state of Your Majesty's Government and Kingdom, which was addressed to the king in a tone of censure and remonstrance, but appears not to have been printed till 1694. In consequence he was dismissed on 9 August 1682, from the office of Lord Privy Seal.

In 1683, Anglesey appeared at the Old Bailey as a witness in defence of Lord Russell, and in June 1685 he protested alone against the revision of Lord Stafford's attainder. He divided his time between his estate at Blechingdon in Oxfordshire, and his house on Drury Lane in London, where he died in 1686 from quinsy, closing a career marked by great ability, statesmanship and business capacity, and by conspicuous courage and independence of judgement. He amassed a large fortune in Ireland, in which country he had been allotted lands by Cromwell. At his death, his library of books was believed to be the largest English library not in ecclesiastical hands. He was buried at Farnborough, Hampshire.

The unfavourable character drawn of him by Burnet is certainly unjust and not supported by any evidence. Pepys, a far more trustworthy judge, speaks of him invariably in terms of respect and approval as a "grave, serious man," and commends his appointment as treasurer of the navy as that of "a very notable man and understanding and will do things regular and understand them himself". That being so, his appearance was also said to be strange, even alarming: "his face long and emaciated, his complexion between purple and green."

On a more intellectual point, he was a learned and cultivated man and collected a celebrated library, which was dispersed at his death. His books were sold at auction in London beginning on 26 October 1686. The sale was interrupted by the overseer of the press, Sir Roger L’Estrange, to withdraw controversial materials which included the removal of works by John Milton. Many of his books have now been identified, however, including a heavily annotated copy of the Latin translation of Margaret Cavendish's Life of William Cavendish.

== Works ==
- A True Account of the Whole Proceedings betwixt ... the Duke of Ormond and ... the Earl of Anglesey (1682)
- A Letter of Remarks upon Jovian (1683)
- The King's Right of Indulgence in Matters Spiritual ... asserted (1688)
- Truth Unveiled, to which is added a short Treatise on ... Transubstantiation (1676)
- The Obligation resulting from the Oath of Supremacy (1688)
- England's Confusion (1659)
- Reflections on a Discourse concerning Transubstantiation

Memoirs of Lord Anglesey were published by Sir P. Pett in 1693, but contain little biographical information and were repudiated as a mere imposture by Sir John Thompson, his son-in-law, in his preface to Lord Anglesey's State of the Government in 1694. The author however of the preface to The Rights of the Lords asserted (1702), while blaming their publication as "scattered and unfinished papers," admits their genuineness.

== Marriage and legacy ==
Anglesey married Elizabeth, daughter and co-heiress of Sir James Altham of Oxey, Hertfordshire, a baron of the Exchequer, and his first wife Margaret Skinner. They had seven sons and six daughters, including:

- James (1645–1690), who succeeded as 2nd Earl of Anglesey, married (in 1669) Elizabeth, daughter of John Manners, 8th Earl of Rutland and Frances Montagu;
- Altham, created Baron Altham;
- Richard (died 1701), served as Dean of Exeter and succeeded as 3rd Baron Altham, married Dorothy, daughter of John Davey, of Ruxford, Devon;
- Arthur;
- Charles, who married Margaret Eyre and had issue;
- Dorothy, married Richard Power, 1st Earl of Tyrone (1630–1690) in 1654;
- Elizabeth, married Alexander MacDonnell, 3rd Earl of Antrim (1615–1699);
- Frances (died 1704/5), married firstly Francis Windham, of Felbrigg, Norfolk, and secondly (in 1668) John Thompson, 1st Baron Haversham;
- Philippa (died 1714/5), married firstly Charles Mohun, 3rd Baron Mohun (their son was the duellist Charles, 4th Baron Mohun), and secondly William Coward, of Wells, Somerset; and
- Anne, married Sir Francis Wingate J.P. of Harlington Grange, Harlington. The latter arrested John Bunyan and committed him to prison. Bunyan was held overnight at Harlington Grange.

James's sons succeeded as the 3rd, 4th and 5th earls. Richard's second son, Richard (died 1761), succeeded his cousin as the 6th earl, and left a son Arthur (1744–1816), whose legitimacy was doubted and his father's English titles were declared extinct. He was summoned to the Irish House of Peers as Viscount Valentia, but was denied his writ to the parliament of Great Britain by a majority of one vote. He was created Earl of Mountnorris in 1793 in the Peerage of Ireland. All the male descendants of the 1st Earl of Anglesey became extinct in the person of George, 2nd Earl of Mountnorris, in 1844, when the titles of Viscount Valentia and Baron Mountnorris passed to his cousin Arthur (1785–1863), who thus became 10th Viscount Valentia, being descended from the 1st Viscount Valentia the father of the 1st Earl of Anglesey in the Annesley family. The 1st viscount was also the ancestor of the Earls Annesley in the Irish peerage.

Anglesea Street in southside Dublin is named for him; he owned an estate in the area.

== Notes ==
Parliament of England
Vacant Title last held by Charles Price	Member of Parliament for Radnorshire; 1647–1648	Vacant Title next held by George Gwynne; Henry Williams
Preceded by Richard Tighe	Member of Parliament for Dublin City; 1659–1660	Succeeded by Sir William Davys; William Smith (in the restored Parliament of Ireland)
Vacant Title last held by David Morgan	Member of Parliament for Carmarthen; 1660–1661	Succeeded by Lord Vaughan
Political offices
Preceded by Sir George Carteret	Treasurer of the Navy; 1667–1668	Succeeded by Sir Thomas Osborne; Sir Thomas Littleton
Preceded by The Lord Robartes	Lord Privy Seal; 1673–1682	Succeeded by The Marquess of Halifax
Peerage of England
New creation	Earl of Anglesey; 2nd creation 1661–1686	Succeeded by James Annesley
Peerage of Ireland
Preceded by Francis Annesley	Viscount Valentia; 2nd creation 1660–1686	Succeeded by James Annesley
