= Elizabeth Annesley, Countess of Anglesey (died 1700) =

Elizabeth Annesley, Countess of Anglesey (née Lady Elizabeth Manners; died 7 December 1700) was an English noblewoman. She was the wife of James Annesley, 2nd Earl of Anglesey, and the mother of the 3rd, 4th, and 5th Earls.

Elizabeth was a daughter of John Manners, 8th Earl of Rutland, and his wife, the former Frances Montagu. Her sisters, Margaret, Frances and Dorothy, all became countesses, while another, Anne, became a Viscountess.

Elizabeth Manners married the future Earl of Anglesey on 17 September 1669 (or 1666), and they had four children:

- Lady Elizabeth Annesley (died 1725), who married Robert Gayer and had one daughter
- James Annesley, 3rd Earl of Anglesey (1674-1702), who married Lady Catherine Darnley; they had one daughter and were legally separated in 1701
- John Annesley, 4th Earl of Anglesey (1676-1710), who married Henrietta Stanley, 4th Baroness Strange, and had one daughter
- Arthur Annesley, 5th Earl of Anglesey (c.1677-1737), who married Hon. Mary Thompson and had no children.

James Annesley inherited his father's earldom on 6 April 1686. He died four years later, at which point Elizabeth became Dowager Countess. The earl having died intestate, she was granted the administration of his estate in England and Ireland, with an estimated value of £4,000 per annum.

The countess was buried on 10 December 1700 at St. James's, Westminster.
