= Francis Annesley =

Francis Annesley may refer to:

- Francis Annesley (1663–1750), British member of parliament for Preston and Westbury
- Francis Annesley (1734–1812), English member of parliament for Reading
- Francis Annesley, 1st Viscount Valentia (1585–1660), English statesman during the colonisation of Ireland
- Francis Annesley, 1st Earl Annesley (1740–1802), Anglo-Irish politician and peer
- Francis Annesley, 6th Earl Annesley (1884–1914), Anglo-Irish peer, Royal Navy officer and pioneer aviator
