= Richard Annesley, 6th Earl of Anglesey =

Irish peer

The Right Honourable The Earl of Anglesey

Personal details
- Born: Richard Annesley c. 1693
- Died: 14 February 1761 Camolin Park, County Wexford, Ireland
- Occupation: Irish peer

Richard Annesley, 6th Earl of Anglesey (c. 1693 – 14 February 1761), known as The Lord Altham between 1727 and 1737, was an Irish peer and governor of Wexford. He is known for the doubts surrounding his claim to the barony of Altham, for the questionable legitimacy of his marriages and therefore of his son's claim to his titles, and for his arranging the kidnapping of his nephew, a rival claimant to his titles and estates. This incident is believed to have influenced part of the novel Kidnapped by Robert Louis Stevenson.

== Background ==
Annesley was the second son of Richard Annesley, 3rd Baron Altham, sometime prebendary of Westminster, and Dean of Exeter, by Dorothy, daughter of John Davy. Baptised in 1693 in Exeter, he was for a short time an ensign in the army, but quit the service in 1715. He succeeded his elder brother Arthur Annesley, 4th Baron Altham, as 5th Baron Altham (a title in the Peerage of Ireland) in 1727, and was thus able to take a seat in the Irish House of Lords. In 1737 he also succeeded his cousin Arthur Annesley, 5th Earl of Anglesey, as 7th Baron Mountnorris and 7th Viscount Valentia (titles in the Peerage of Ireland) and as 6th Baron Annesley and 6th Earl of Anglesey (titles in the Peerage of England).

== Claim to the Altham barony by James Annesley ==
In or about 1742 there appeared in England one James Annesley, who claimed to be the legitimate son of Arthur, the late 4th Baron Altham, and consequently a nephew of Anglesey. As a young teenager, Annesley was kidnapped, shipped to the American plantations and ended up on a Mennonite Farm in present-day Lancaster County, and sold as an indentured servant in 1728, apparently on the orders of his uncle. He escaped slavery, and in 1743 he was assaulted, for which offences Anglesey was convicted in 1744. Annesley's claim to the titles reached the courts in 1743 who found in his favour, but Anglesey immediately lodged an appeal. Anglesey's defence was that Annesley was not the legitimate son of Mary, but actually the illegitimate son of Joan Landy. Ironically, the final verdict went in James's Annesley favour and his estates were returned to him, but he did not obtain his titles before he died at the age of 44 in 1760. Anglesey continued in the enjoyment of his estates and his titles until his death at Camolin Park in County Wexford on 14 February 1761.

== Marriages and children ==
In Devon in 1715, he married Ann Prust (1694–1741), daughter of Captain John Prust, of Monckton, near Bideford, Devon, but he appears to have deserted her almost immediately. Also in 1715, it is reported he married in Ireland Ann Simpson (c. 1700–1765), daughter of Dublin clothier John Simpson. He and Prust had seemingly separated by 1719, after which he appears to have lived with Simpson in Ireland, whom he forced to quit his house in 1740 or 1741. In 1741, Simpson took proceedings against him in the ecclesiastical court on the grounds of cruelty and adultery, with a view to obtaining permanent alimony; he set up by way of defence that he was lawfully married to Prust at the time when he was alleged to have gone through the ceremony of marriage with Simpson, and she appears to have gained nothing by her suit. Simpson died in 1765, leaving three daughters:

- Dorothea (1728–1774), writer and poet, married M. Du Bois, a French musician, in 1752 and had issue;
- Caroline; and
- Elizabeth.

Prust died without issue and was buried in August 1741 as Countess of Anglesey. In September, he married in private Juliana (a second, public ceremony took place in 1752) and they had four children:

- Arthur (1744–1816), succeeded to his father's Irish titles as 8th Viscount Valentia and was later created Earl of Mountnorris, married and had issue;
- Richarda, married Robert Phaire, of Temple Shannon;
- Juliana, married Sir Frederick Flood, 1st Baronet, of Newton Ormonde; and
- Catherine, married John O'Toole.

Juliana was first rumoured to be the daughter of Richard Donovan, a merchant in Wexford, and this later evolved into the accusation she was the daughter of an alehouse-keeper in Camolin. However Juliana was actually of noble lineage, being the daughter of Richard Donovan (newly of Camolin), of the junior sept of Ballymore of the ancient O'Donovans of Clan Loughlin, from the distant Barony of Carbery. She was the great-great-great granddaughter of Donel Oge na Cartan O'Donovan, the 1st Lord of Clan Loughlin to hold his territories from the Crown, from 1616 (see surrender and regrant). A near cousin from the senior line was Jeremiah O'Donovan (MP Baltimore), and to her very own sept later belonged Edward Westby Donovan, Commander of British Troops in Hong Kong.

Additionally, his children included Ann, daughter of Mrs Mary Glover of Newport Pagnell, and Richard, son of Mrs Anne Salkeld (daughter of William Salkeld). Richard claimed Anglesey and Salkeld married in 1742, however, this would have been bigamous assuming Anglesey's 1741 marriage to Juliana.

== Succession ==
Upon Anglesey's death in 1761, two memorials were presented to the Earl of Halifax, the Lord-Lieutenant of Ireland: one by Juliana, on behalf of her infant son Arthur, and the other by Sir John Annesley, a distant cousin who claimed Arthur was illegitimate. Both memorials were referred to the attorney-general and solicitor-general for consideration, who in 1765 reported to the lords-justices in favour of the claim of Arthur, who accordingly, on coming of age, took his seat in the Irish House of Lords.

He was not, however, so successful in the proceedings which he took to make good his claim to the English earldom. In 1766, being then of age, he presented a petition to the king, praying to be summoned to parliament as Earl of Anglesey and Baron of Newport-Pagnell. The petition was considered by the committee of privileges in 1770–1. It was opposed by Lord Mulgrave, who claimed to be interested in the result by virtue of the will of James, 3rd Earl of Anglesey, the grandfather of the claimant. Alexander Wedderburn, who became solicitor-general during the progress of the inquiry, and Mr. Dunning, appeared for the claimant; Mr. Serjeant Leigh and Mr. Mansfield for Lord Mulgrave.

The issue came to depend entirely on whether a certain marriage certificate, bearing the date 1741, was genuine or not. Juliana swore that she had been secretly married to Anglesey in 1741, and produced the certificate in evidence. On the other hand, Mulgrave's witnesses swore that the certificate had been made out at the date of the marriage in 1752, and purposely antedated. The witnesses to the alleged marriage being all dead, the case for the claimant broke down, and the committee reported that he had no right to the titles, honours, and dignities claimed by him. The earldom and other titles in the English peerage accordingly became extinct in 1761. Anglesey by his will had entailed his estates upon the issue of his son Arthur, whose right to the Irish titles was reinvestigated on the petition of John Annesley of Ballysax, Esq., but was confirmed. Arthur was created Earl of Mountnorris in 1793. This title has, however, since become extinct, with the present Viscount Valentia being the lineal descendant of the sixth son of the first viscount.

== Notes ==
Peerage of England
Preceded by Arthur Annesley	Earl of Anglesey; 1737–1761	Extinct
Peerage of Ireland
Preceded by Arthur Annesley	Viscount Valentia; 1737–1761	Succeeded by Arthur Annesley
Preceded by Arthur Annesley	Baron Altham; 1727–1761	Succeeded by Arthur Annesley
