= Arthur Annesley, 10th Viscount Valentia =

Irish peer

Shield of arms of The Viscount Valentia

Arthur Annesley, 10th Viscount Valentia (30 November 1785 – 30 December 1863) was an English-born land-owner, an Irish peer and the Premier Baronet of Ireland.

== Family ==
Arthur Annesley was born on 30 November 1785, the eldest son of Arthur Annesley, MP for Oxford between 1790 and 1796, and his wife, Catherine Hardy, a daughter of Admiral Sir Charles Hardy. He was a male-line, paternal descendant of the first Viscount Valentia.

He married, on 12 August 1808, Eleanor O'Brien, the daughter of Henry O'Brien (later Stafford-O'Brien) of Blatherwycke park, Northamptonshire and his wife Margaret Flenary. Together, they had thirteen children, four sons and nine daughters:

- Arthur Annesley (1809–1844). He married, in 1836, Flora-Mary Macdonald, daughter of Lieutenant-Colonel James Macdonald, and had issue, two daughters and one son:
  - Mary Annesley (1836–1879), who married, on 24 February 1855, Captain Walter Chidiock Nangle, and had issue.
  - Flora Annesley (born 1841), who married, on 23 June 1863, Colonel Francis Lyon, and had issue.
  - Lieutenant Arthur Annesley, eleventh Viscount Annesley KCVO CB JP (1843–1927), who inherited the title from his grandfather, and who served as High Sheriff of Oxfordshire in 1874, as MP for Oxford from 1895 to 1917, and Comptroller of the Household from 1898 to 1905.
- Temple Arthur Francis Annesley (1813–1838).
- Charles Arthur James George Annesley (born 1820).
- Captain Algernon Sydney Arthur Annesley (born 1829), became Colonel of the Oxfordshire Militia, and married, on 11 October 1864, Helen Sydney Richards, a daughter of Griffiths Richards QC., and had issue
- Ellen Arthur Frances Annesley (died 1811), a twin with her sister,
- Catherine Arthur Letitia Annesley (died 1811).
- Elearnor Arthur Catherine Annesley.
- Frances Arthur Charlotte Annesley, who married, on 17 October 1853, Captain William Linskill of Tynemouth Lodge, Northumberland, and had issue.
- Matilda Arthur Marina Annesley, who married, on 10 July 1845, John Kent Egerton Holmes, and had issue.
- Eva Arthur Henry Medora Annesley, who married, on 12 January 1853, Sir Henry Robinson. They were the parents of Henry Robinson, first Baronet,KCB, sometime Vice-President of the Local Government Board of Ireland, and had issue., great-grandchildren included stained glass artist Evie Hone.
- Nea Arthur Ada Rose d'Amour Annesley, who married, on 24 April 1846, Hercules George Robert Robinson, first Baron Rosmead, GCMG, a Governor of Hong Kong, and had issue.
- Augusta Arthur Constantia Annesley.
- Altisidora Arthur Victoria Annesley.

== Titles ==
On the death of the ninth Viscount Valentia, who had no immediate relatives, Annesley, being a very distant cousin, assumed the peerage, which had been created in 1642, without attempting to establish this right in the House of Lords. Cokayne points out that he was "probably correct" in assuming the peerage. He also assumed the title of Baron Mountnorris, another Irish peerage, which was also held by the ninth Viscount, and was the Premier Baronet of Ireland, inheriting also the Annesley Baronetcy, of Newport Pagnell.

== Ancestry ==
Ancestors of Arthur Annesley, 10th Viscount Valentia

4. Arthur Annesley
2. Arthur Annesley
5. Elizabeth Baldwyn
1. Arthur Annesley, 10th Viscount Valentia
6. Admiral Sir Charles Hardy
3. Catherine Hardy
7. Catherine Stanyan

== Later life ==
Lord Valentia died on 30 December 1863 at Bletchingdon park, aged 78. His wife had predeceased him, having died on 10 June 1843.

Peerage of Ireland
Preceded by George Annesley	Viscount Valentia; 1844–1863	Succeeded by Arthur Annesley
