= Elizabeth Annesley, Countess of Anglesey =

Elizabeth Annesley, Countess of Anglesey (9 January 1620 – January 1698) was the wife of Arthur Annesley, 1st Earl of Anglesey. They were married on 24 April 1638 in London. At the time of their marriage, her husband's style was The Hon. Arthur Annesley. In 1660 he inherited his father's title of Viscount Valentia, making Elizabeth a viscountess, and in the following year he was created Earl of Anglesey, making her a countess.

Elizabeth was the daughter and co-heiress of Sir James Altham of Oxhey, Hertfordshire (son of James Altham), and his wife Elizabeth Sutton. The countess's sister, Frances, married Richard Vaughan, 2nd Earl of Carbery.

Elizabeth and her husband had seven sons and six daughters, including:

- James (1645–1690), who succeeded his father to become the 2nd Earl of Anglesey and married (in 1669) Elizabeth, daughter of John Manners, 8th Earl of Rutland and Frances Montagu
- Altham, who was created Baron Altham in 1681
- Richard (1655–1701), who served as Dean of Exeter, succeeded as 3rd Baron Altham, and married Dorothy, daughter of John Davey, of Ruxford, Devon
- Arthur
- Charles
- Dorothy, who married Richard Power, 1st Earl of Tyrone (1630–1690) in 1654
- Elizabeth (died 1672), who married Alexander MacDonnell, 3rd Earl of Antrim (1615–1699)
- Frances (1648-1704/5), married first Francis Windham, of Felbrigg, Norfolk, and second (in 1668) John Thompson, 1st Baron Haversham
- Philippa (died 1714/5), married first Charles Mohun, 3rd Baron Mohun of Okehampton, and second William Coward, of Wells, Somerset
- Anne, who married Sir Francis Wingate J.P. of Harlington Grange, Harlington

The countess died some time in January 1697/8, and was buried at St Anne's Church, Soho.
