= William Annesley, 1st Viscount Glerawly =

Irish politician and noble

The Right Honourable The Viscount Glerawly

Member of Parliament for Midleton
- In office 1741–1759 Serving with Eaton Stannard, James Hamilton, James St John Jeffereyes
- Preceded by: Richard Bettesworth; Eaton Stannard
- Succeeded by: Francis Andrews; James St John Jeffereyes

Personal details
- Born: 1710
- Died: 2 September 1770 (aged 59–60) Clontarf, Dublin
- Spouse: Lady Anne Beresford (1738–1770)
- Relations: Joseph Martin (grandfather)
- Children: Catherine Gore, Countess of Arran; Francis Annesley, 1st Earl Annesley; Hon. Marcus Annesley; Richard Annesley, 2nd Earl Annesley; Hon. William Annesley
- Parent(s): Francis Annesley; Elizabeth Martin

William Annesley, 1st Viscount Glerawly (1710 – 2 September 1770) was an Irish politician and noble.

== Early life ==
Annesley was born in 1710. He was the sixth of seven sons, and two daughters, born to Elizabeth (née Martin) Annesley and Francis Annesley, MP.

His maternal grandfather was London merchant Sir Joseph Martin. His paternal grandparents were the former Deborah Jones (a daughter of Henry Jones, Bishop of Meath) and Hon. Francis Annesley (the eldest son, by his second wife, of Francis Annesley, 1st Viscount Valentia, and thus his descendants are in the remainder to the title Viscount Valentia).

== Career ==
In 1738, he was a barrister at Dublin. Though not heir male, Annesley succeeded his father in the estate of Castlewellan upon his death in 1750.

Annesley sat as Member of Parliament (MP) in the Irish House of Commons for Midleton between 1741 and 1758. He served as High Sheriff of Down in 1750. In 1758 he was raised to the Peerage of Ireland as Baron Annesley, and assumed his seat in the Irish House of Lords. He was further honoured when he was made Viscount Glerawly in 1766.

== Personal life ==
On 16 August 1738, Lord Glerawly married Lady Anne Beresford, a daughter of Marcus Beresford, 1st Earl of Tyrone and the former Lady Catherine Power (only daughter of James Power, 3rd Earl of Tyrone). Among her siblings were George Beresford, 1st Marquess of Waterford, John Beresford, and William Beresford, 1st Baron Decies. Together, they were the parents of five children:

- Hon. Catherine Annesley (1739–1770), who married Arthur Gore, 2nd Earl of Arran, in 1760.
- Francis Charles Annesley, 1st Earl Annesley (1740–1802), who married Mary Grove, daughter of Robert Grove, in 1766.
- Hon. Marcus Annesley (1743–1780), a Major.
- Richard Annesley, 2nd Earl Annesley (1745–1824), who married Anne Lambert, daughter of Robert Lambert, in 1771.
- Hon. William Annesley (1747–1817), the Dean of Down who married Jane Digby.

Lord Glerawly died on 2 September 1770 at Clontarf, Dublin. He was succeeded in the viscountcy by his eldest son Francis, who was created Earl Annesley in 1789 with special remainder to his brother, Richard.

Parliament of Ireland
| Preceded by Richard Bettesworth; Eaton Stannard | Member of Parliament for Midleton; 1741–1759; With: Eaton Stannard 1741–1755; James Hamilton 1755–1758; James St John Jeffereyes 1758–1759 | Succeeded by Francis Andrews; James St John Jeffereyes |
Peerage of Ireland
| New creation | Viscount Glerawly; 1766–1770 | Succeeded by Francis Annesley |
| New creation | Baron Annesley; 1758–1770 | Succeeded by Francis Annesley |
