= James Annesley =

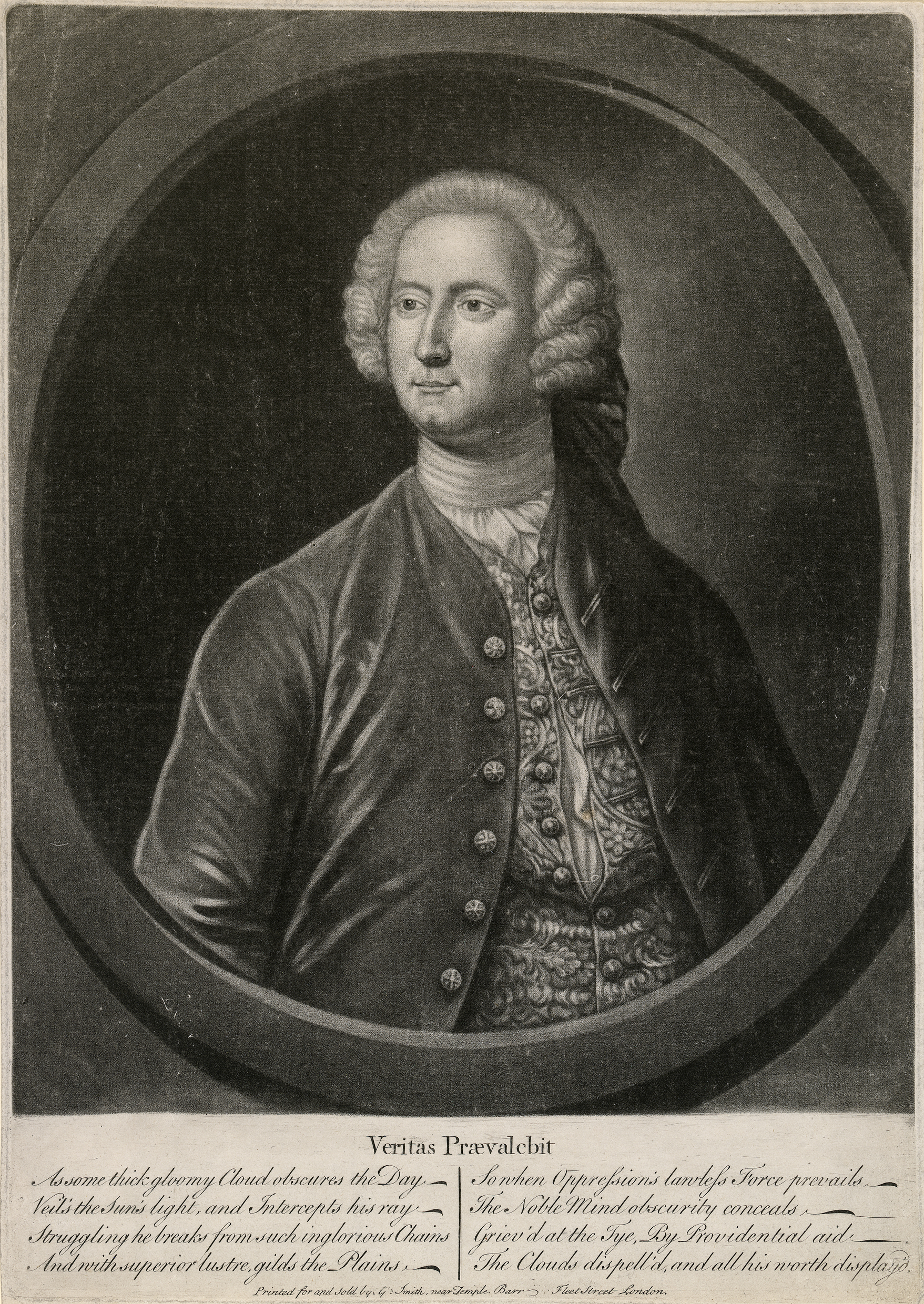
- Born: 1715
- Died: 1760 (aged 44–45)
- Father: Arthur Annesley, 4th Baron Altham

James Annesley (1715 – 5 January 1760) was an Irishman with a claim to the title Earl of Anglesey, one of the wealthiest estates in Ireland. The dispute between Annesley and his uncle Richard Annesley was infamous in its time, but his story is perhaps best known today as a possible inspiration for the 19th-century novel Kidnapped by Robert Louis Stevenson and other works.

== Life ==
Annesley is said to have been born on April 15, 1715, in Dunmaine, County Wexford, to Arthur Annesley, 4th Baron Altham (1689–14 Nov 1727), an Anglo-Irish peer, and his wife Mary Sheffield (1692-Oct 1729), a daughter of the 1st Duke of Buckingham and Normanby (1648–1721). After the family moved to Dublin, Mary, Lady Altham was thrown out of the house, apparently for infidelity, and James, rejected by Lord Altham, his father, was left to run in the streets. Then, at about the age of 12 in 1728, soon after the death of his father, young Annesley was kidnapped and shipped to a plantation in Delaware, where he was sold into indentured servitude, on the orders of his uncle, Richard Annesley. By removing James from the line of succession, Richard was able to claim the title and lands of the earldom of Anglesey.

In 1740, after about 12 years working as an indentured servant, James escaped from the plantation (his third attempt) and made his way overland to Philadelphia where he took passage on a merchant ship to Port Royal in Jamaica. There, on August 11, 1740, records indicate he signed on with the Royal Navy under the command of Admiral Vernon as a midshipman on HMS Falmouth. Contemporaneous newspaper accounts indicate he was identified by a former "school-mate, at whose father's house he boarded" to be James Annesley. He served throughout the campaign against Cartagena, Colombia, but saw no action. He was discharged in October 1741.

Daniel MacKercher engraved by John Brooks, after Justin Stevens mezzotint, 1744 (National Portrait Gallery, London # D38100)

In 1741, James returned to England, then to Scotland where he accidentally killed a man during a hunting excursion. Richard, de facto Lord Altham, used that death to try to have James hanged for murder, but was unsuccessful due to last-minute testimony that the event was an accident. Richard failed to pay his attorney in that attempted successful prosecution, and that failure lead to testimony in the following case in which major precedents were set regarding modern attorney/client privilege. Eventually, James returned to Ireland where he laid claim to his birthright by means of the famous case of Annesley v Anglesea, with the help of the Scottish Barrister Daniel Mackercher.

Richard's legal defence throughout the highly publicised trial was that James was not the legitimate son of Lady Mary Sheffield, Baroness Altham, but the illegitimate son of Joan "Juggy" Landy, who James said was merely his wetnurse. The final verdict went in James's favour and his estates were returned to him, but he did not obtain his titles before he died at the age of 44. His uncle Richard died about a year later. James Annesley was buried in the Old Churchyard of St Margaret's, Lee in London in an unmarked grave.

Some records indicate that on 14 September 1751, at Bidborough, Kent, James Annesley had married Margaret I'Anson, and they had had a son and a daughter. However, this son died in 1764 aged about 7, and the daughter died May 1765 aged about 12. Other records indicate that he had married a daughter of a Mr Chester and had three children - two daughters and a son; the son James Annesley died November 1763, and an elder daughter who married Charles Wheeler.

== Historiography ==
The Annesley case attracted enormous interest in both Dublin and London. Abridged trial reports appeared in daily newspapers and periodicals, such as the Gentleman's Magazine, and 15 separate accounts of the trial were printed.

Fictionalised accounts circulated in literature during and soon after the events. Eliza Haywood's novel Memoirs of an Unfortunate Young Nobleman (1743) was published before the major trial, and narrates a wildly inaccurate imagining of James' life in the American Colonies. In Tobias Smollett's novel Peregrine Pickle (1751), Smollett says he was a surgeon's mate in the Royal Navy contemporaneous with James Annesley's tenure in the same. It is stated that the story of James Annesley inspired Sir Walter Scott in writing Guy Mannering (1815), though the author never claimed such directly. It is claimed that Kidnapped by Robert Louis Stevenson was inspired by the events of James Annesley's life. In 2014, David Marlett published a historical novel based on the life of James Annesley, Fortunate Son: A Novel of the Greatest Trial in Irish History.

There have been a number of nonfiction works on the subject including Charles Reade's The Wandering Heir (1872).

In 2010 A. Roger Ekirch published Birthright: The True Story That Inspired Kidnapped, a biography of James Annesley. Ekirch wrote that, while historians had long dismissed many details of Annesley's story as fiction, he had found a trove of legal documents that show that the story as traditionally told was mostly true. Ekirch's book was the first about the case since Andrew Lang edited The Annesley Case in 1912. The Johnsonian scholar and mystery writer Lillian de la Torre extensively researched unpublished documents in Ireland in the early 1960s, but her long projected book still remained in manuscript at the time of her death. She did, however, publish a number of articles in scholarly journals on aspects of Annesley's life. She also mentioned the case in passing in her note to her "Dr. Johnson" detective story "The Lost Heir" published in The Return of Dr. Sam Johnson, Detector, though the plot of the story is based chiefly on the later Tichbourne case.

== Kidnapped ==
A. Roger Ekirch and others have argued that the novel Kidnapped by Robert Louis Stevenson was inspired by the story of James Annesley. They point to similarities such as an uncle kidnapping a fatherless and rightful heir at a young age and shipping him to the colonies, and the heir then returning and claiming his birthright from the villainous uncle. As Ekirch writes:

It is inconceivable that Stevenson, a voracious reader of legal history, was unfamiliar with the saga of James Annesley, which by the time of Kidnapped’s publication in 1886 had already influenced four other 19th-century novels, most famously Sir Walter Scott’s Guy Mannering (1815) and Charles Reade’s The Wandering Heir (1873).

However, there is no direct evidence for this connection because Stevenson left no statement about his sources for Kidnapped. Stevenson's wife Fanny Stevenson wrote that one inspiration for Kidnapped was The Trial of James Stewart, a contemporary account of the Appin murder, concerning the killing of Colin Roy Campbell, but this does not preclude there having been more than one influence on Kidnapped.

== Sources ==
- Andrew Lang (ed.), The Annesley Case (William Hodge & Co., 1912) Notable English Trials series
- A. Roger Ekirch (2010). Birthright: The True Story That Inspired Kidnapped. W.W. Norton. ISBN 978-0-393-06615-9
- "Annesley, James" . Dictionary of National Biography. London: Smith, Elder & Co. 1885–1900.
