= Richard Annesley, 2nd Earl Annesley =

Irish politician

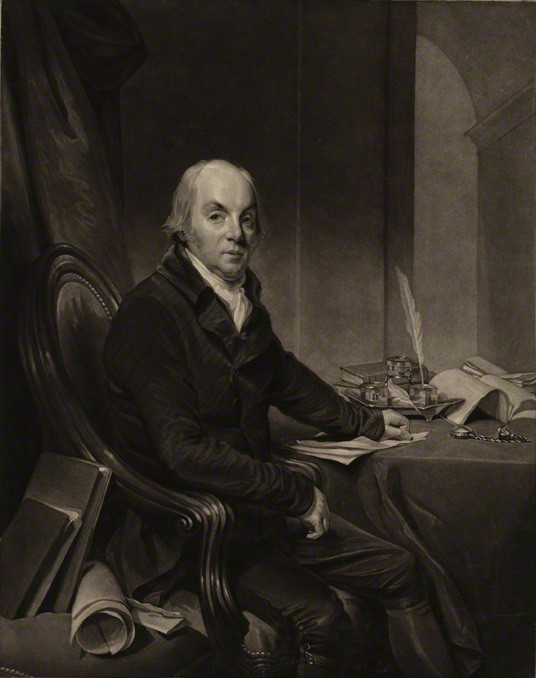
Richard Annesley, 2nd Earl Annesley by Charles Turner, after William Cuming.

Richard Annesley, 2nd Earl Annesley PC (Ire) (14 April 1745 – 9 November 1824), styled The Honourable from 1758 to 1802, was an Anglo-Irish politician and noble.

== Biography ==
Lord Annesley was educated at Trinity College Dublin. He was the second son of William Annesley, 1st Viscount Glerawly, and Lady Anne Beresford. He inherited the earldom created for his childless brother through the terms of the special remainder, as well as the viscountcy which had been created for his father, in 1802. He represented Coleraine in the Irish House of Commons from 1776 to 1783 and then St Canice to 1790. Subsequently, he sat for Newtownards until 1798, when Annesley was elected for Fore and Blessington. He chose the latter constituency and sat for it until 1800. In this year, he stood for Clogher and Midleton, which he represented until the Act of Union in 1801. He served as High Sheriff of Down in 1783.

=== Marriage and issue ===
He married Anne Lambert on 25 September 1771 and with her had six children:

- William Richard Annesley, 3rd Earl Annesley (1772–1838)
- Hon. Robert Annesley (1773–1825)
- Lt.-Gen. Arthur Grove-Annesley (1774–1849)
- Captain Francis Charles Annesley (1775–1832)
- Catherine O'Donnell née Annesley (1776–1830)
- Anna Maria born (1778 –

Parliament of Ireland
Preceded by Richard Jackson; Theophilus Jones	Member of Parliament for Coleraine; 1776–1783; With: Richard Jackson	Succeeded by Richard Jackson; John Beresford
Preceded by John Monck Mason; Dominick Trant	Member of Parliament for St Canice; 1783–1790; With: John Monck Mason	Succeeded by John Monck Mason; Marcus Beresford
Preceded by Sir William Morres, 3rd Bt; Henry Alexander	Member of Parliament for Newtownards; 1790–1798; With: John La Touche (Sr) 1790–1796; John La Touche (Jr) 1796–1798	Succeeded by Sir John Blaquiere, 1st Bt; Robert Alexander
Preceded by John Reilly; David Ker	Member of Parliament for Blessington; 1798–1800; With: John Reilly	Succeeded by John Reilly; William Saurin
Preceded by John Macartney; Richard Magenis	Member of Parliament for Fore; January–March 1798; With: Robert Ross	Succeeded by Cromwell Price; Sir John Tydd, 1st Bt
Preceded by Thomas Burgh; Jonah Barrington	Member of Parliament for Clogher; January–March 1800; With: William Gardiner	Succeeded by John King; Charles Ball
Preceded by Benjamin Blake Woodward; John Francis Cradock	Member of Parliament for Midleton; 1800–1801; With: Benjamin Blake Woodward	Succeeded by Parliament of the United Kingdom
Peerage of Ireland
Preceded by Francis Annesley	Earl Annesley; 1802–1824	Succeeded by William Annesley
