= Juliana Annesley, Countess of Anglesey =

English noblewoman

Juliana Donovan, Countess of Anglesey (died 26 February 1777), was the second or third wife, and later the widow, of the notorious Richard Annesley, 6th Earl of Anglesey, and mother of his son and heir Arthur Annesley, 1st Earl of Mountnorris. Much maligned by their numerous enemies, some of whom were relations of the earl, the countess became widely rumoured to be of very low birth and character. In doubt, and the subject of many proceedings during her life and following her death, was the date of her marriage to the 6th Earl and thus the legitimacy of his only son.

== Lineage ==
The early rumours that she was the daughter of a Wexford merchant eventually evolved into the scandalous accusation she was the daughter of an unlicensed alehouse keeper in Camolin, where Annesley had an estate. The Countess was in fact of noble lineage, however, and of a fairly prosperous family, which had only just arrived in the area. An O'Donovan, she was the great-great-great-granddaughter of the 1st Lord (Chief) of Clan Loughlin to hold his lands from the Crown. The daughter of Rickard Donovan (newly of Camolin), 4th son of Rickard Donovan of Clonmore (1st O'Donovan in County Wexford), son of Mortogh O'Donovan, son of Rickard na Cartan O'Donovan, 3rd son of Donal Oge na Cartan O'Donovan of Cloghatradbally (now called Glandore Castle), who surrendered his considerable estates to James I of England in 1615, receiving a regrant in 1616.

A near cousin from the senior line was Jeremiah O'Donovan. Their common ancestor Donal Oge na Cartan was a kinsman and contemporary of the better known Donal II O'Donovan, Lord of Clancahill. Between them the O'Donovans had until recently controlled approximately 100,000 acres (400 km^{2}) in the Barony of Carbery, as well as several profitable harbours, including Glandore, where Clan Loughlin was based. But most importantly they are considered to be of ancient royal extraction. The last to be styled a regional king in the Irish annals was Amlaíb Ua Donnabáin, slain in 1201.

Finally, the countess's brother Cornelius was a Captain of Dragoons. Her uncle Mortogh Donovan, elder brother of her father Rickard of Camolin, was Justice of the Peace and High Sheriff for County Wexford. A later cousin, and again from her own junior sept, was Edward Westby Donovan.

The Ballymore estate in Camolin where the family based itself in Juliana's time is still in existence, with the Donovans still in possession of it. It can be visited as a museum.

== Dorothea Dubois ==
Contributing to the countess's poor image was the poet Dorothea Dubois, dispossessed daughter of Richard Annesley by his earlier wife or partner Ann Simpson, whom he had set aside for Juliana in 1740 or 1741. Dubois devoted some lines of her poetry to her feelings and imaginations about this sad affair, and the countess is the "Tenant's Daughter" referred to in the following passage:

Transient Felicity! Anglesus grew
Unkind to Anna, sigh'd for something New;
Beheld a Tenant's Daughter with Desire,
Nor scrupled to indulge the guilty Fire.
Tho' mean the Nymph, and common to Mankind
She gain'd an Empire o'er his fickle Mind;
Contriv'd such Schemes, and us'd such subtile Art,
She soon, alas! occasion'd them to part.

== Issue ==
- Arthur Annesley, 1st Earl of Mountnorris
- Lady Richarda
- Lady Juliana
- Lady Catherine, married Count John O'Toole, a colonel in the French service, considered "the handsomest man in Paris before the Revolution"
  - Lorenzo O'Toole, Esq., married a Miss Harriett Hall, heiress to a very large fortune, daughter of Hugh Hall, Esq.
    - Lorenzo O'Toole, since Lorenzo-Kirkpatrick Hall, married 2nd Emma-Selina Mundy, and had issue one son and four daughters
  - Cecilia Juliana
