= Arthur Annesley, 5th Earl of Anglesey =

Anglo-Irish Tory politician

The Right Honourable The Earl of Anglesey PC, PC (Ire)

Personal details
- Born: c. 1678
- Died: 31 March 1737 Farnborough, Hampshire, England
- Resting place: Farnborough, Hampshire, England
- Party: Tory
- Education: Magdalen College, Oxford
- Occupation: Anglo-Irish politician

Arthur Annesley, 5th Earl of Anglesey PC, PC (Ire) (c. 1678 – 31 March 1737), of Farnborough, Hampshire, Bletchingdon, Oxfordshire, and Knockgrenan, near Camolin, county Wexford, was an Anglo-Irish Tory politician who sat in the English and British House of Commons from 1702 to 1710 and in the Irish House of Commons from 1703 to 1710. He then succeeded as 6th Viscount Valentia and 5th Earl of Anglesey, joining both the British and Irish House of Lords. He served as Vice-Treasurer in Ireland from 1710 to 1716 and was a member of the regency commission upon the succession of George I.

== Early life and family ==
Annesley was the third son of James Annesley, 2nd Earl of Anglesey and his wife Elizabeth Manners (died 1700), daughter of John Manners, 8th Earl of Rutland. He was appointed a Gentleman of the Privy Chamber to William III in 1689, and began studies at Eton College around 1693. He attained an MA from Magdalene College, Cambridge in 1699, and was elected a fellow the next year. In 1724, he gave £200 to Magdalene College for the establishment of a librarian post for the Pepys Library.

He married his cousin Mary Thompson (died 1719) on 6 January 1702, third daughter of John Thompson, 1st Baron Haversham and Frances, daughter of Arthur Annesley, 1st Earl of Anglesey.

== Political life ==
Anglesey was returned at the 1702 English general election as Tory Member of Parliament for Cambridge University. In 1703, he was elected to represent New Ross, near his family estate in County Wexford, for the Irish Parliament. He held both seats until the death of his brother John in 1710, when he succeeded as 6th Viscount Valentia and 5th Earl of Anglesey in the Irish and English peerages respectively. He was appointed to the British and Irish Privy Councils in 1710 and 1711 respectively.

Anglesey became Vice-Treasurer and Paymaster General in Ireland, but in 1711, after spending a period in Ireland, he had ambitions to succeed the Duke of Ormond as Viceroy of Ireland. When the Duke of Shrewsbury replaced Ormond, he opposed the parliamentary confirmation of the commercial treaty with France and undermined Shrewsbury in Ireland.

In July 1714 he was commissioned to remodel the Irish Army. However, following the death of Queen Anne in August he took his place on the regency commission for George I until his arrival from Hanover. Following the publication of plans to reduce the Irish army, he lost his position in court by 1715, and in 1716 he was removed from office, expressed in public as voluntary.

He served as High Steward of the University of Cambridge from 1722 to 1737.

The death of George I in 1727 saw Anglesey encourage Irish Torys to come to court, however, his appointment as Governor of County Wexford was one of only a few gains.

Anglesey died from the effects of gout on 31 March 1737 in Farnborough, Hampshire, where he was buried. He and his wife had no children and he was succeeded as 6th Earl of Anglesey by his cousin Richard Annesley, 5th Baron Altham.

== Footnotes ==
Parliament of England
Preceded by Henry Boyle; Isaac Newton	Member of Parliament for Cambridge University; 1702–1707; With: Henry Boyle 1702–1705; Dixie Windsor 1705–1707	Succeeded by Parliament of Great Britain
Parliament of Great Britain
Preceded by Parliament of England	Member of Parliament for Cambridge University; 1707–1710; With: Dixie Windsor	Succeeded by Dixie Windsor; Thomas Paske
Parliament of Ireland
Preceded by Thomas Crawford; Francis Annesley	Member of Parliament for New Ross; 1703–1710; With: Thomas Crawford 1703–1707; Amyas Bushe 1707–1711	Succeeded by Amyas Bushe; Jeffrey Paul
Peerage of England
Preceded by John Annesley	Earl of Anglesey; 2nd creation 1710–1737	Succeeded by Richard Annesley
Peerage of Ireland
Preceded by John Annesley	Viscount Valentia; 2nd creation 1710–1737	Succeeded by Richard Annesley
