= Arthur Annesley, 1st Earl of Mountnorris =

Irish peer

The Right Honourable Arthur Annesley FRS
- Earl of Mountnorris
- Tenure: 1793 – 1816 (as Earl of Mountnorris); 1761 – 1816 (as Viscount Valentia and Baron Altham)
- Predecessor: New creation (as Earl of Mountnorris); Richard Annesley (as Viscount Valentia and Baron Altham)
- Successor: George Annesley, 2nd Earl of Mountnorris
- Other titles: Viscount Valentia; Baron Altham
- Born: 7 August 1744
- Died: 4 July 1816 (aged 71)
- Spouses: Hon. Lucy Lyttleton (m. 1767) Hon. Sarah Cavendish (m. 1783)
- Father: Richard Annesley, 6th Earl of Anglesey
- Mother: Juliana Annesley, Countess of Anglesey

Arthur Annesley, 1st Earl of Mountnorris FRS (7 August 1744 – 4 July 1816) was an Irish peer.

He was the son of Richard Annesley, 6th Earl of Anglesey, and Juliana Donovan, Countess of Anglesey, who belonged to the junior sept of the O'Donovans of Clan Loughlin, the Donovans of Ballymore in County Wexford. She was initially rumoured to be of lower birth, the ancient pedigrees of some Irish families not being widely known in the English-speaking world at that time, and hers deriving from a remote region of Ireland, the Barony of Carbery. Countess Juliana was the great-great-great-granddaughter of Donel Oge na Cartan O'Donovan, the 1st Lord of Clan Loughlin to hold his territories from the Crown, from 1616 (see surrender and regrant).

He succeeded to the title of 6th Baron Altham, of Altham, in County Cork, and to the title of 8th Viscount Valentia upon his father's death on 14 February 1761.

On 22 April 1771, the House of Lords decided that his claim to his father's English titles was not valid, and that therefore these titles had become extinct on his father's death in 1761. He was created 1st Earl of Mountnorris [Ireland] on 3 December 1793.

== Family ==
He married, firstly, Hon. Lucy Lyttelton, daughter of George Lyttelton, 1st Baron Lyttelton of Frankley, and Lucy Fortescue, on 10 May 1767. They had, among other children:

- George Annesley, 2nd Earl of Mountnorris (2 November 1769 – 23 July 1844)
- Lady Juliana Lucy Annesley (1772 – 10 October 1833), eldest daughter and fourth child, married John Maxwell (later Maxwell-Barry, 5th Baron Farnham) in 1789, and had no issue.

He next married Hon. Sarah Cavendish, daughter of Sir Henry Cavendish, 2nd Baronet, and Sarah Cavendish, 1st Baroness Waterpark, on 20 December 1783. They had, among other children:

- Lady Frances Wedderburn-Webster (1793–1837), married James Wedderburn-Webster, and had issue. She was notorious for her supposed love affairs with famous men such as Lord Byron and the Duke of Wellington, even if these may only have been flirtations.
- Lady Catherine Annesley (18 July 1793 – 25 June 1865), married Lord John Thomas Henry Somerset, eighth son of Henry Somerset, 5th Duke of Beaufort, and had one child, Sir Alfred Somerset.

Peerage of Ireland
New title	Earl of Mountnorris; 1793 – 1816	Succeeded by George Annesley
Preceded by Richard Annesley	Viscount Valentia; 1761 – 1816	Succeeded by George Annesley
