= William Annesley, 3rd Earl Annesley =

Anglo-Irish noble and British Member of Parliament

William Richard Annesley, 3rd Earl Annesley (16 July 1772 – 25 August 1838) was an Anglo-Irish noble and British Member of Parliament.

Lord Annesley was the eldest son of Richard Annesley, 2nd Earl Annesley and Anne Lambert. He was educated at Trinity College, Dublin. He married Lady Isabella St. Lawrence, a daughter of William St. Lawrence, 2nd Earl of Howth on 19 May 1803 and with her had one daughter:

- Lady Mary Annesley (c. 1810–1837)

Lord Annesley divorced Lady Isabella St. Lawrence by Act of Parliament in 1821. He then married Priscilla Cecilia Moore on 15 July 1828, with her having six sons:

- William Richard Annesley, 4th Earl Annesley (1830–1874)
- Hugh Annesley, 5th Earl Annesley (1831–1908)
- The Hon. Robert John Annesley (1834–1854)
- The Hon. Arthur Annesley (1835–1881)
- The Hon. George Annesley (1837–1903)
- The Hon. William Octavius Beresford Annesley (1838–1875)

He was High Sheriff of Down for 1822.

Parliament of the United Kingdom
Preceded by Charles Stewart Hawthorne	Member of Parliament for Downpatrick; 1815–1820	Succeeded by John Waring Maxwell
Peerage of Ireland
Preceded by Richard Annesley	Earl Annesley; 1824–1838	Succeeded by William Annesley
