= William Annesley, 4th Earl Annesley =

The Right Honourable The Earl Annesley
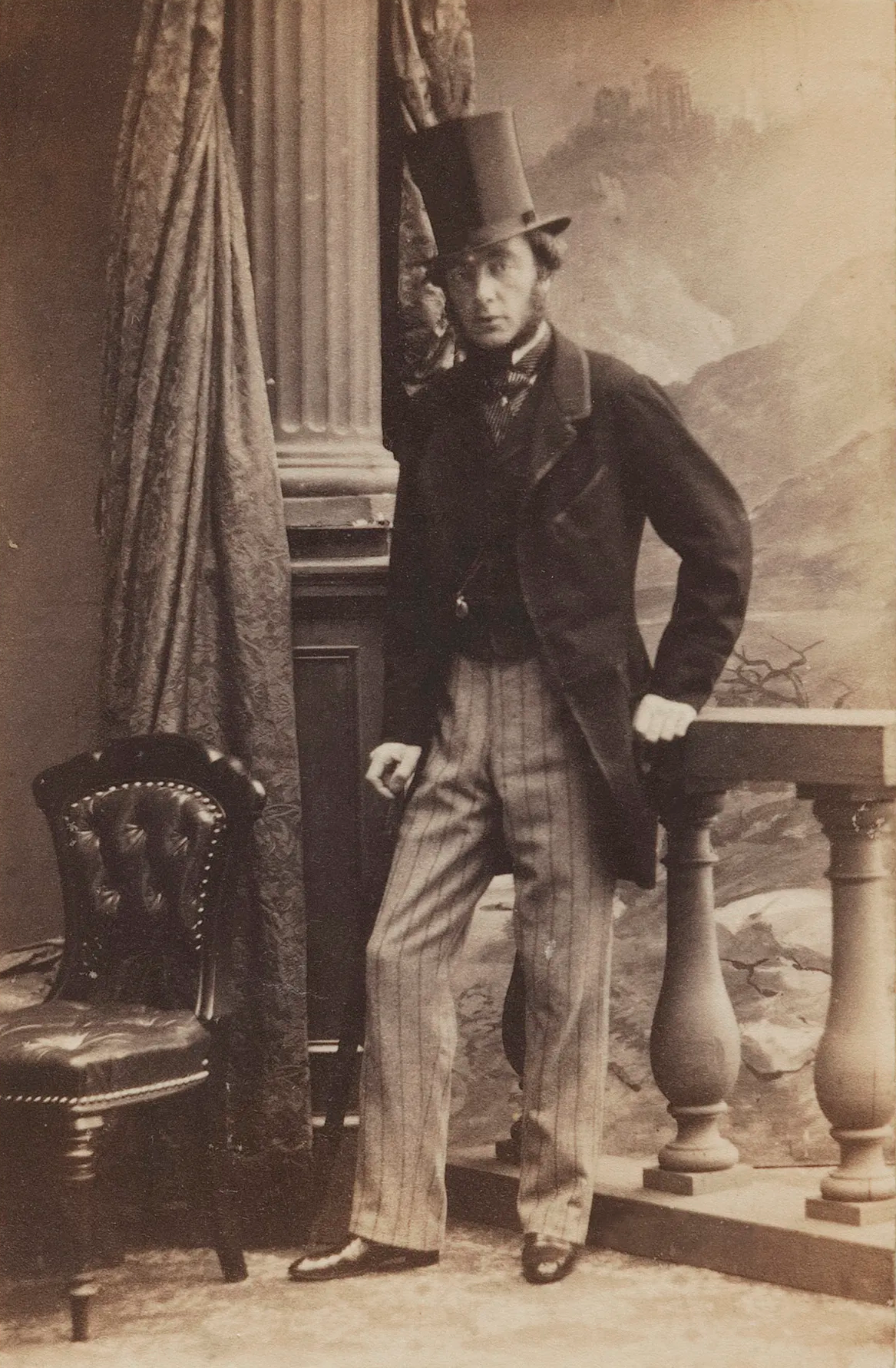
- Portrait by Camille Silvy, 1860

Member of the House of Lords
- Lord Temporal
- Representative Peer of Ireland; 1867–1874
- Preceded by: The Earl of Mayo
- Succeeded by: The Earl of Clonmell

Member of Parliament for Great Grimsby
- In office 1852–1857
- Preceded by: Edward Heneage
- Succeeded by: Lord Worsley

Personal details
- Born: William Richard Annesley; 21 February 1830 Parnell Square, Dublin, Ireland
- Died: 10 August 1874 (aged 44) Cowes, Isle of Wight, England
- Relatives: Hugh Annesley, 5th Earl Annesley (brother)

William Richard Annesley, 4th Earl Annesley (21 February 1830 – 10 August 1874), styled Viscount Glerawley until 1838, was an Irish-born British Conservative politician.

== Background ==
Born at Rutland Square (now Parnell Square), Dublin, Annesley was the eldest son of William Annesley, 3rd Earl Annesley, by his second wife Priscilla Cecilia, daughter of Hugh Moore. He was educated at the University of Cambridge.

== Political career ==
Annesley succeeded in the earldom in August 1838 on the death of his father. As this was a title in the Peerage of Ireland it did not entitle him to a seat in the House of Lords. He was instead elected to the House of Commons for Great Grimsby in the 1852 general election, a seat he held until 1857. In 1867 he was elected an Irish representative peer, which he remained until his death.

== Personal life ==
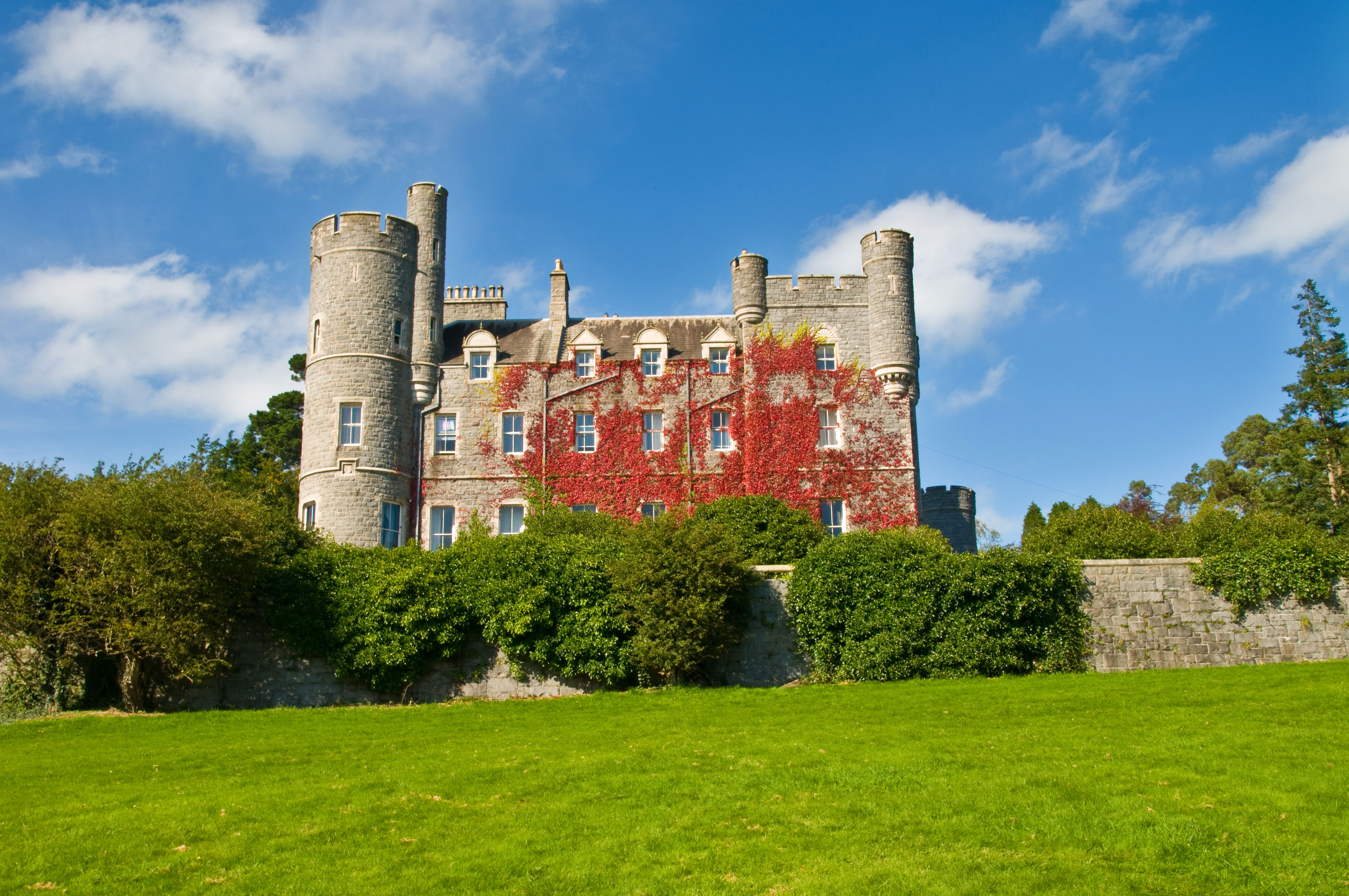
Castlewellan Castle

He inherited the Castlewellan Estate in County Down and built Castlewellan Castle on the estate c.1856.

Lord Annesley died at Cowes, Isle of Wight, in August 1874, aged 44. He was unmarried and was succeeded in his titles by his younger brother, Hugh.

Parliament of the United Kingdom
Preceded by Edward Heneage	Member of Parliament for Great Grimsby; 1852–1857	Succeeded by Lord Worsley
Political offices
Preceded by The Earl of Mayo	Representative peer for Ireland; 1867–1874	Succeeded by The Earl of Clonmell
Peerage of Ireland
Preceded by William Richard Annesley	Earl Annesley; 1838–1874	Succeeded by Hugh Annesley
