= John Annesley, 4th Earl of Anglesey =

English peer and landowner

Annesley arms

John Annesley, 4th Earl of Anglesey (18 January 1676 – 18 September 1710), was an English peer and landowner.

A younger son of James Annesley, 2nd Earl of Anglesey (1645–1690), by his marriage to Lady Elizabeth Manners, daughter of John Manners, 8th Earl of Rutland, he succeeded to the family estates and Earldom of Anglesey on the death of his brother James in 1701/02. On 21 May 1706, he married Lady Henrietta Maria Stanley (1687–1718), the daughter of William Stanley, 9th Earl of Derby. Some years later, the title of Baron Strange was called out of abeyance in her favour and she became Baroness Strange in her own right.

In 1710, shortly before his death, Anglesey was appointed as Vice Treasurer, Receiver-General and Paymaster of the Forces for Ireland and was sworn into the Queen's Privy Council.

Peerage of England
Preceded by James Annesley	Earl of Anglesey; 1702–1710	Succeeded by Arthur Annesley
Peerage of Ireland
Preceded by James Annesley	Viscount Valentia; 1702–1710	Succeeded by Arthur Annesley
