= Francis Annesley, 1st Earl Annesley =

Anglo-Irish politician

Francis Annesley, 1st Earl Annesley (27 November 1740 – 19 December 1802) was an Anglo-Irish politician and peer.

He was the son of William Annesley, 1st Viscount Glerawly and Lady Anne Beresford, the daughter of Marcus Beresford, 1st Earl of Tyrone. He held the office of Member of Parliament for Downpatrick between 1761 and 1770. On 12 September 1770 he succeeded his father as Viscount Glerawly and assumed his seat in the Irish House of Lords. On 17 August 1789, Annesley was created Earl Annesley, of Castlewellan in the County of Down, in the Peerage of Ireland. The earldom was created with special remainder to his brother, Richard, as Annesley had no legitimate children.

Parliament of Ireland
Preceded by Bowen Southwell; Cromwell Price	Member of Parliament for Downpatrick; 1761–1770; With: Mathew Forde	Succeeded by Mathew Forde; Clotworthy Rowley
Peerage of Ireland
New creation	Earl Annesley; 1789–1802	Succeeded by Richard Annesley
Preceded by William Annesley	Viscount Glerawly; 1770–1802	Succeeded by Richard Annesley
