= George Annesley, 2nd Earl of Mountnorris =

British peer and politician

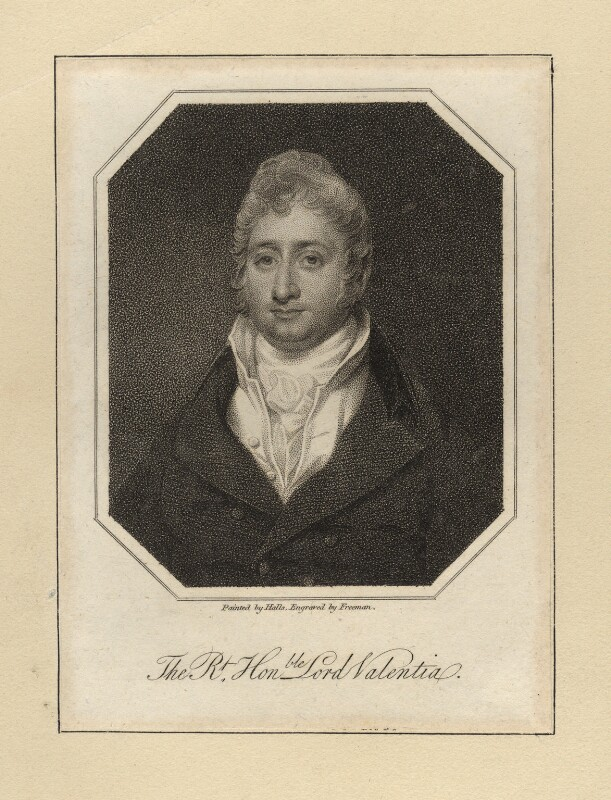
George Annesley, 2nd Earl of Mountnorris

George Annesley, 2nd Earl of Mountnorris FRS (4 December 1770 – 23 July 1844), styled Viscount Valentia between 1793 and 1816, was a British peer and politician.

== Background ==
Mountnorris was the son of Arthur Annesley, 1st Earl of Mountnorris, and the Hon. Lucy, daughter of George Lyttelton, 1st Baron Lyttelton. He matriculated at Brasenose College, Oxford in 1787, and left in 1789 without taking a degree.

== Political career ==
Mountnorris sat as Member of Parliament for Yarmouth from 1808 to 1810.

== Trip to India ==
In 1802 Henry Salt was appointed secretary and draughtsman to George Annesley, Viscount Valentia. They started on an eastern tour, travelling on Minerva to India via the Cape. Salt explored the Red Sea area, and in 1805 visited the Ethiopian Highlands. He returned to England in 1806. Salt's paintings from the trip were used to illustrate Lord Valentia's Voyages and Travels to India, Ceylon, the Red Sea, Abyssinia and Egypt, in the years 1802, 1803, 1804, 1805, and 1806, published in 1809 in three volumes.

== Family ==
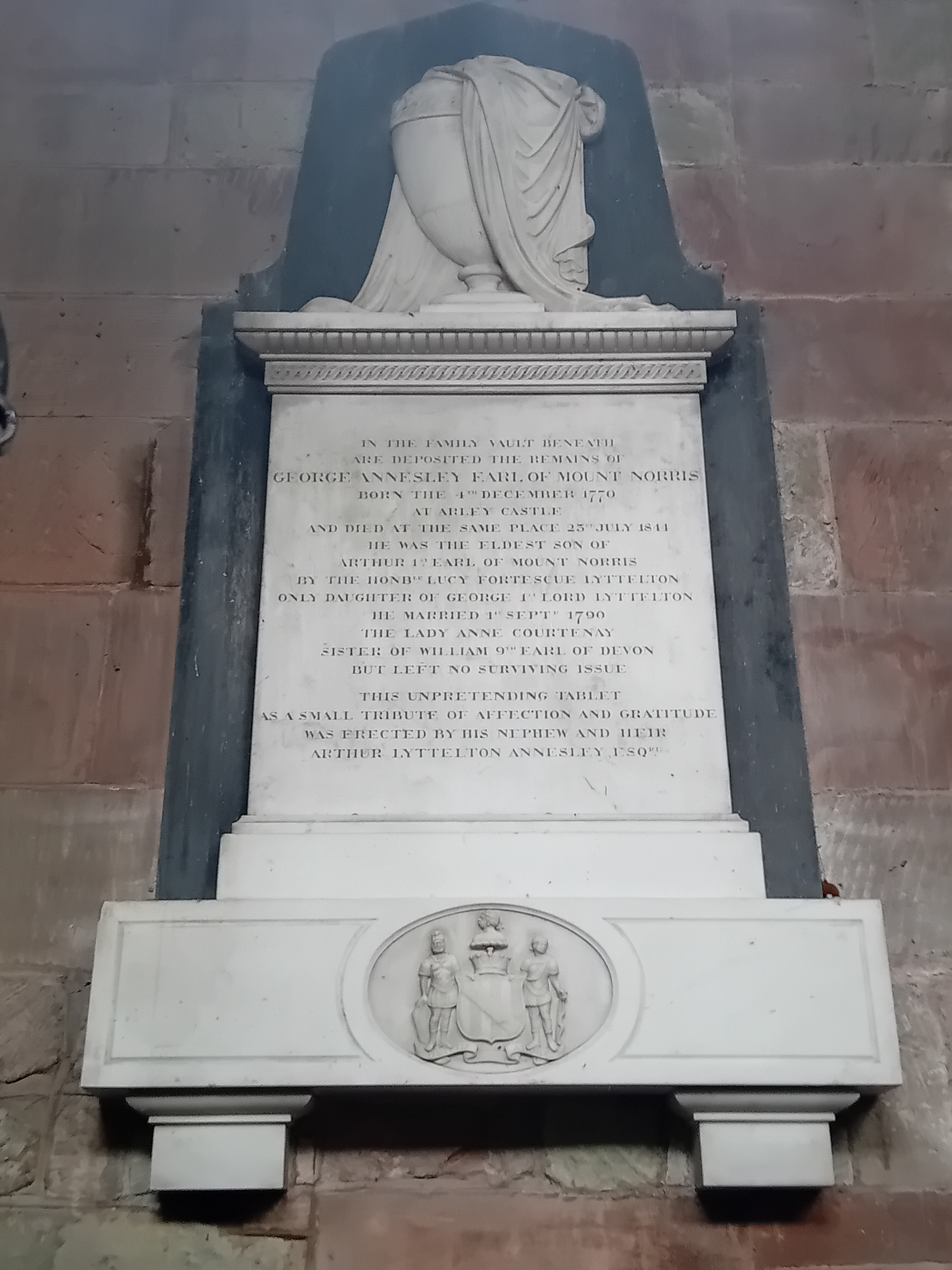
Memorial to Mountnorris in St Peter's Church, Upper Arley

In 1790, Lord Valentia married Anne, daughter of William Courtenay, 2nd Viscount Courtenay, from whom he soon separated. In 1796, he charged John Bellendon Gawler with crim. con. with his wife. She counter claimed that Valentia was a promiscuous homosexual.

In 1799 Valentia was granted a legal separation, but was not granted a divorce — probably because he was suspected of collusion in his wife's adultery. Lady Valentia, having had several children by Gawler, died in January 1835, aged 60. Lord Mountnorris died in July 1844, aged 73. He had no surviving male issue and on his death, the earldom of Mountnorris became extinct, while he was succeeded in the baronetcy of Newport-Pagnell, the barony of Mountnorris and the viscountcy of Valentia by his distant relative, Arthur Annesley, who became the 10th Viscount Valentia.

Parliament of the United Kingdom
Preceded by Sir John Orde, Bt; John Delgarno	Member of Parliament for Yarmouth; 1808 – 1810; With: Sir John Orde, Bt	Succeeded by Sir John Orde, Bt; Thomas Myers
Peerage of Ireland
Preceded by Arthur Annesley	Earl of Mountnorris; 1816 – 1844	Extinct
Preceded by Arthur Annesley	Viscount Valentia; 1816 – 1844	Succeeded by Arthur Annesley
