= Francis Annesley, 6th Earl Annesley =

Anglo-Irish peer (1884–1914)

The Right Honourable The Earl Annesley
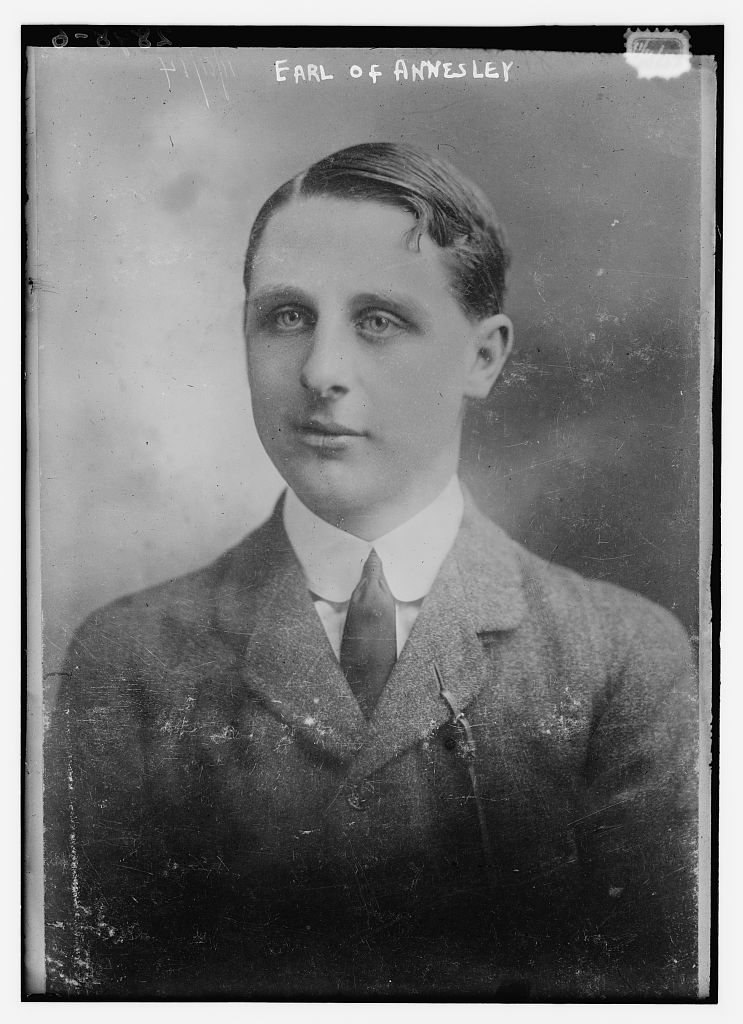

Personal details
- Born: 25 February 1884 Castlewellan, County Down, Ireland
- Died: 6 November 1914 (aged 30) Near Diksmuide, Belgium
- Cause of death: Killed in action
- Spouse: Evelyn Hester Mundy
- Education: Trinity College, Cambridge

Francis Annesley, 6th Earl of Annesley (25 February 1884 – 6 November 1914), styled Viscount Glerawly between 1884 and 1908, was an Anglo-Irish peer, Royal Navy officer and pioneer aviator who died in a plane crash at sea.

== Biography ==
He was the only son of Hugh Annesley, 5th Earl Annesley and his first wife, Mabel Markham. He was born on 25 February 1884 at Castlewellan, Kilmegan, County Down, Ulster, Ireland. He was educated at Eton and Trinity College, Cambridge. He succeeded as Earl Annesley on 15 December 1908. On 14 February 1909 he married Evelyn Hester Mundy. They had no children.

He was a Sub-Lieutenant in the Royal Navy Volunteer Reserve. Later he joined the Royal Naval Air Service.

Before obtaining his age of majority he sailed from Liverpool to Vancouver, around Cape Horn, serving as a sailor before the mast. Later he crossed the Atlantic on board a three-masted schooner yacht Karina as one of the guests of Robert E. Todd of the New York Yacht club. He was a noted big game shot.

Prior to joining 2 (Naval) Squadron, Royal Naval Air Service at Eastchurch, he distinguished himself serving with the R.N.A.S. Armoured Car Division, with his armoured motorcar in helping to check the advance of the Germans on Brussels and in the defence of Antwerp.

Lord Annesley was last seen alive on 6 November 1914 leaving Eastchurch, England, in a Bristol T.B.8 biplane, serial 1220, flown by Flight Lieutenant C.F. Beevor, R.N.A.S., bound for France / Flanders. They were never seen again. His death was presumed on 2 December 1914 by Mr. Justice Astbury. Two German prisoners had been interrogated and it was established that the two aviators had been shot down when a German shell had hit the petrol tank of their aircraft and it had fallen in flames near Diksmuide.

== Legacy ==
After his death his estate was valued at £42,751. He was succeeded in his title by his cousin, Walter Beresford Annesley (1861–1934).

Peerage of Ireland
Preceded by Hugh Annesley	Earl Annesley; 1908–1914	Succeeded by Walter Beresford Annesley
