= Richard Annesley, 3rd Baron Altham =

English cleric and Irish peer

Richard Annesley, 3rd Baron Altham (1655 – 19 November 1701), styled The Honourable Richard Annesley between 1681 and 1700, was Dean of Exeter between 1681 and 1701.

Richard Annesley was the son of Arthur Annesley, 1st Earl of Anglesey, and his wife Elizabeth. He was educated at Magdalen College, Oxford, graduating M.A. in 1670-1 and B.D. in 1677 (incorporated at Cambridge 1678). He became Prebendary of Westminster in 1679, and Prebendary and then Dean of Exeter in 1681. In 1689 he became Vicar of Colyton Rawleigh, Devon.

In 1700 Annesley succeeded his nephew James as 3rd Baron Altham.

Church of England titles
Preceded by George Cary	Dean of Exeter; 1681–1701	Succeeded by William Wake
Peerage of Ireland
Preceded by James George Annesley	Baron Altham; 1700–1701	Succeeded by Arthur Annesley
