= Henrietta Stanley, 4th Baroness Strange =

English peer

Henrietta Maria Stanley, 4th Baroness Strange (1687 – 26 June 1718) was an English peer.

Henrietta, Lady Ashburnham, by Michael Dahl, 1717.

Henrietta was born in 1687, the daughter of the 9th Earl of Derby. Her brother James died in Venice some years before the death of their father in 1702. Her uncle James became Earl of Derby. Meanwhile the subsidiary title of Baron Strange, fell into abeyance between Henrietta and her younger sister Elizabeth. On Lady Elizabeth's death in 1714 Henrietta became the sole heir and succeeded to the title. She inherited a considerable estate from her father, which involved her and her two husbands in legal disputes with her uncle and mother.

On 21 May 1706, she married the 4th Earl of Anglesey. They had a daughter Elizabeth, who died young. Following his death in 1710, Henrietta then married the 3rd Baron Ashburnham (later created Earl of Ashburnham) on 24 July 1714. She brought her husband a fortune of £20,000. They had one child Henrietta Bridget, who succeeded her mother as Baroness Strange. She died unmarried in 1732.

The 4th Lady Strange died in 1718 and was buried at Ashburnham, East Sussex. Some years following her death, Parliamentary intervention was required to settle the ownership of the Bretherton estate which she had inherited.

Peerage of England
| Preceded by William Stanley | Baroness Strange; 1702–1718 | Succeeded by Henrietta Bridget Ashburnham, (d. 1732) |
