= Francis Annesley, 1st Viscount Valentia =

English statesman

The Right Honourable The Viscount Valentia PC (Ire)
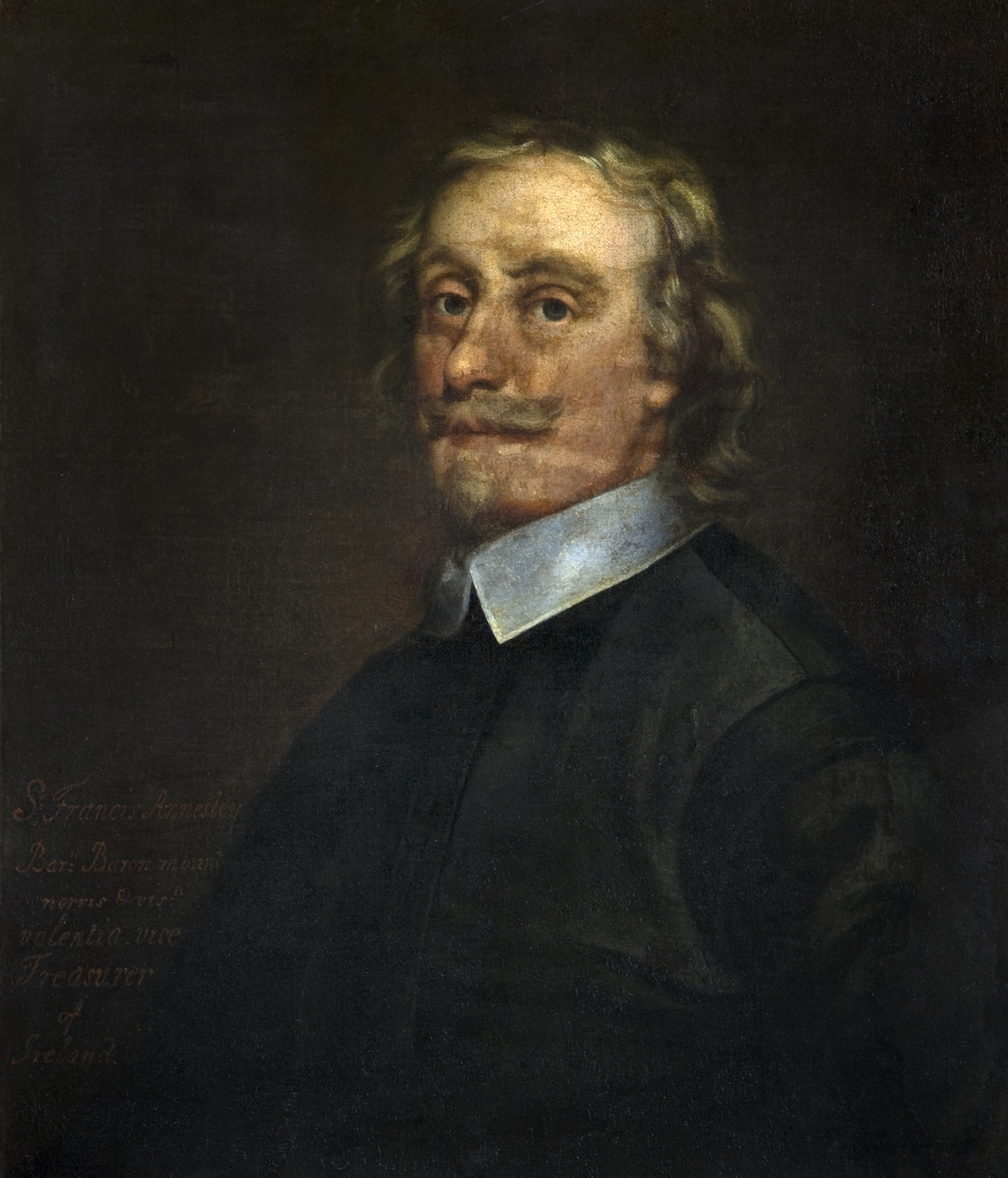

Personal details
- Born: Francis Annesley; 1 February c. 1585 Buckinghamshire
- Died: 22 November 1660 Thorganby, Yorkshire, England
- Resting place: Thorganby, Yorkshire, England
- Occupation: English and Irish politician

Francis Annesley, 1st Viscount Valentia, PC (Ire) (1 February c. 1585 – 22 November 1660) was an English statesman during the colonisation of Ireland in the seventeenth century. He was a Member of Parliament for both the English and Irish houses, was elevated to the Irish peerage as Baron Mountnorris, and later gain the additional title Viscount Valentia. He is best remembered for his clash with the Lord Lieutenant, Thomas Wentworth, who in order to render Annesley powerless had him sentenced to death on a spurious charge of mutiny, although it was clearly understood that the sentence would not be carried out.

== Biography ==
=== Rise to power ===
Annesley, descended from the ancient Nottinghamshire family of Annesley, was the son of Robert Annesley, high constable of Newport, Buckinghamshire, and his wife Beatrice Cornwall, daughter of John Cornwall of Moor Park, Hertfordshire, and was baptised 2 January 1586.

As early as 1606 he had left England to reside at Dublin, and he took advantage of the frequent distributions of Irish land made to English colonists in the early part of the seventeenth century to acquire estates in various parts of Ireland. With Sir Arthur Chichester, who became Lord Deputy of Ireland in 1604, he lived on terms of intimacy, and several small offices of state, with a pension granted 5 November 1607, were bestowed on him in his youthful days.

In the colonisation of Ulster, which began in 1608, Annesley played a leading part, and secured some of the spoils. In October 1609 he was charged with the conveyance of Sir Niall Garve O'Donnell and other Ulster rebels to England for trial. On 13 March 1611–12 James I wrote to the Lord Deputy confirming his grant of the fort and land of Mountnorris to Annesley "in consideration of the good opinion he has conceived of the said Francis from Sir Arthur's report of him". On 26 May 1612, Annesley was granted a reversion to the clerkship of the Checque of the Armies and Garrisons, to which he succeeded on 9 December 1625.

In 1614, County Armagh returned Annesley to the Irish parliament, and he supported the Protestants there in their quarrels with the Catholics. Meanwhile, his sister Bridget Annesley, a lady of the bedchamber in the household of Anne of Denmark may have been able to promote his career.

In 1616, he was sworn of the Irish Privy Council. On 16 July, the King knighted him at Theobalds; in 1618 he was acting as Principal Secretary of State for Ireland, although he may not have been formally appointed; on 5 August 1620 received from the king an Irish baronetcy; and, on 11 March 1620–21, received a reversionary grant to the viscounty of Valentia, which had recently been conferred on Sir Henry Power, a kinsman of Annesley, who had no direct heir.

In 1625, he was elected to represent the county of Carmarthen in the English parliament. Meanwhile, in 1622, Lord Falkland became Lord Deputy of Ireland. Dissensions between Annesley and the new governor in the council chamber were constant, and, in March 1625, the Lord Deputy wrote to Conway, the English Secretary of State, that a minority of the councillors, "amongst whom Sir Francis Annesley is not least violent nor the least impertinent", was thwarting him in every direction. But Annesley's friends at the English court contrived his promotion two months later to the important post of Vice-Treasurer and Receiver-General of Ireland, which gave him full control of Irish finance, and, in 1628, Charles I raised him to the Irish peerage as Baron Mountnorris of Mountnorris.

In October of the same year, an opportunity was given Annesley, of which he readily took advantage, to make Falkland's continuance in office impossible. He was nominated on a committee of the Irish privy council appointed to investigate charges of injustice preferred against Falkland by the Byrne Clan, who had held land in County Wicklow for centuries. The committee, relying on the testimony of corrupt witnesses, condemned Falkland's treatment of the Byrnes, and Falkland was of necessity recalled on 10 August 1629. On 13 June 1632, the additional office of Treasurer at Wars was conferred on Mountnorris.

=== Sir Thomas Wentworth ===
In 1633 the formidable Sir Thomas Wentworth, afterwards Earl of Strafford, became Lord Deputy, and Mountnorris soon discovered that he was determined to insist on the rights of his office far more emphatically than Falkland. Although they were related by marriage, Wentworth disliked Mountnorris from the first as a gay liver, and as having been long guilty, according to popular report, of corruption in the conduct of official duties.

In May 1634 Wentworth obtained an order from the English Privy Council forbidding his practice of taking percentages on the revenue to which he was not lawfully entitled; this order Mountnorris refused to obey. Fresh charges of malversation were brought against him in 1635, and, after threatening to resign office, he announced that all intercourse between the Lord Deputy and himself was at an end, and that he would take his case to the king personally.

Mountnorris's relatives took up the quarrel. His younger brother at a military review made an insulting gesture to Wentworth, who struck him with his cane in return, and another kinsman deliberately dropped a stool in Dublin Castle on Wentworth's gouty foot. At a dinner (8 April 1635) at the house of Lord Loftus, the Lord Chancellor of Ireland, one of his supporters, Mountnorris boasted of this last act as having been done in revenge of the Lord Deputy's conduct towards himself; he referred to his brother as being unwilling to take "such a revenge", and was understood to imply that some further insult to Wentworth was contemplated.

=== Downfall ===
Wentworth was now resolved to crush Mountnorris, and on 31 July following obtained the consent of Charles I to inquire formally into the Vice-Treasurer's alleged malversation and to bring him before a court-martial for the words spoken at the dinner in April. At the end of November, a committee of the Irish Privy Council undertook the first duty, and on 12 December Mountnorris was brought before a council of war at Dublin Castle and charged, as an officer in the army, with having spoken words disrespectful to his commander and likely to breed mutiny, an offence legally punishable by death. Mountnorris demanded as the privilege of peerage, a trial before the Irish House of Lords: he was told brusquely that a military court knew nothing of his privilege. Wentworth appeared as a suitor for justice; after he had stated his case, and counsel had been refused Mountnorris, the court briefly deliberated in Wentworth's presence, and pronounced sentence of death.

The Lord Deputy informed Mountnorris that he would appeal to the king against the sentence, and added, rather tactlessly: "I would rather lose my hand than you should lose your head." In England the sentence was condemned on all hands; in letters to friends, Wentworth attempted to justify it in the cause of discipline, and even at his trial he spoke of it as in no way reflecting upon himself. The only real justification for Wentworth's conduct, however, lies in the fact that he had obviously no desire to see the sentence executed; he felt it necessary, as he confessed two years later, to remove Mountnorris from office, and this was the most effective means he could take. Hume attempts to extenuate Strafford's conduct, but Hallam condemns the vindictive bitterness he here exhibited in strong terms; and although Mr. S. R. Gardiner has shown that law was technically on Wentworth's side, and his intention was merely to terrify Mountnorris, Hallam's verdict seems substantially just.

As the result, Mountnorris, after three days' imprisonment, was promised his freedom if he would admit the justice of the sentence, but this he refused to do. On the report of the privy council's committee of inquiry he was stripped of all his offices, but on 13 February 1635–6 a petition to Strafford from Lady Mountnorris, which was never answered, proves that he was still in prison. In the petition, she pleaded eloquently with Strafford to remove his "heavy hand" from her dear husband, and appealed to the memory of his beloved second wife Arabella Holles, who was her cousin. She later managed to gain entry to his house, and went on her knees to him: Wentworth treated her courteously but remained implacable. Later in the year, Lady Mountnorris petitioned the king to permit her husband to return to England, and the request was granted.

=== Life after Strafford ===
The rest of Mountnorris's life was passed in attempts to regain his lost offices. On 11 May 1641, he wrote to Strafford enumerating the wrongs he had done him, and desiring, on behalf of his wife and children, a reconciliation with himself, and his aid in regaining the king's favour. But other agencies had already been set at work on his behalf. A committee of the Long Parliament had begun at the close of 1640 to examine his relations with Strafford, and on 9 September 1641, a vote of the commons declared his sentence, imprisonment, and deprivations unjust and illegal. The declaration was sent up to the House of Lords, who made several orders between October and December 1641 for the attendance before them of witnesses to enable them to judge the questions at issue; but their final decision is not recorded in their journals.

In 1642 Mountnorris succeeded by special remainder to the viscounty of Valentia on the death of his cousin Sir Henry Power. In 1643 the House of Commons granted him permission, after much delay, to go to Duncannon in Ireland. In 1646 he was for some time in London, but he lived, when not in Ireland, on an estate near his birthplace, at Newport Pagnell, Buckinghamshire, which had been sold to him by Charles I in 1627. In 1648 Parliament restored him to the office of Clerk of the Signet in Ireland, and made him a grant of £500. Later he appears to have lived on friendly terms with Henry Cromwell, the Lord Deputy of Ireland during the Protectorate, and to have secured the office of Secretary of State at Dublin. In November 1656 he proposed to the English Government that he should resign these posts to his son Arthur. Henry Cromwell, writing to General Fleetwood, urges him to aid in carrying out this arrangement, and speaks in high terms of father and son. Lord Mountnorris died in 1660.

== Family ==
He married firstly Dorothea (died 1624), daughter of Sir John Philipps, 1st Baronet of Picton Castle, Pembrokeshire, and his first wife Anne, daughter of Sir John Perrot, and they had eleven children of whom three sons and several daughters reached adulthood.

He married secondly Jane (died 1683/4), widow of Sir Peter Courten, 1st Baronet, of Aldington and daughter of Sir John Stanhope and his second wife Catherine Trentham, and half-sister of Philip Stanhope, 1st Earl of Chesterfield, and they had nine children of whom at least one son and one daughter reached adulthood. The eldest son of that marriage, Francis, was born on 23 January 1628. On 29 December 1662, he married Deborah, daughter of Henry Jones, Bishop of Meath, and widow of John Boudler of Dublin, who died on 4 September 1672. He served as High Sheriff of Down in 1665 and 1672. His only surviving son was Francis Annesley, who sat in the Irish, English and British Houses of Commons.

Valentia died and was buried in Thorganby, Yorkshire, in November 1660. He was succeeded by his eldest son, Arthur, who was later created Lord Annesley and Earl of Anglesey.

== Arms ==
Coat of arms of Francis Annesley, 1st Viscount Valentia
Crest A Moor's Head in profile couped proper wreathed about the temples Argent and Azure Escutcheon Paly of six Argent and Azure over all a Bend Gules Supporters Dexter: a Roman Soldier in armour Or Short Sleeves and Apron Gules face arms and legs bare the latter sandalled Argent on his head a Helmet Gules on the top three Feathers of the second holding in his exterior hand a Shield thereon a Female's Head: Sinister: a Moorish Prince proper in Armour Or wreathed round the temples Argent and Azure Short Sleeves and Apron Gules Boots Gold behind him a Sheaf of Arrows proper fastened by a Pink Ribbon in his exterior hand a Bow proper Motto Virtutis Amore (By the love of virtue)

== Notes ==
Parliament of Ireland
Preceded by Tobias Caulfeild; John Bourchier	Member of Parliament for County Armagh; 1614; With: Tobias Caulfeild	Succeeded by Faithful Fortescue; William Brownlow
Parliament of England
Preceded by Henry Vaughan	Member of Parliament for Carmarthen; 1625; With: Henry Vaughan	Succeeded by Henry Vaughan
Preceded by Miles Fleetwood; Sir Henry Edmonds	Member of Parliament for Newton; 1628–1629; With: Sir Henry Holcroft	Vacant Parliament suspended until 1640
Peerage of Ireland
New creation	Viscount Valentia; 2nd creation 1642–1660	Succeeded by Arthur Annesley
New creation	Baron Mountnorris; 1628–1660	Succeeded by Arthur Annesley
Baronetage of Ireland
New creation	Baronet (of Newport Pagnell); 1620–1660	Succeeded by Arthur Annesley
