= Dorothea Du Bois =

Irish poet, autobiographer and musical dramatist

Lady Dorothea Du Bois (1728–1774) was an Irish poet, autobiographer and musical dramatist, whose claims on her father's estate were never met.

== Life ==
Du Bois was the eldest daughter of Richard Annesley, afterwards sixth earl of Anglesey, and Ann Simpson, daughter of a wealthy merchant of Dublin. She was born in Dublin in 1728, one year after her father had become Lord Altham. In 1737 he succeeded to the earldom. Dorothea was educated at boarding schools in Dublin.

At this time, the earl made provision for his countess and her children, assigning £10,000 a year to Dorothea, but about 1740 he repudiated his marriage, declared his children illegitimate, and turned them all out of doors. An action brought by the Countess in 1741 resulted in an interim order for a payment by the earl of £4 per week; however, this payment was never made, and the ladies suffered the greatest distress. About 1752, Dorothea secretly married Du Bois, a French musician, and became the mother of six children.

In 1759 she heard that her father had made a will leaving her five shillings, in quit of all demands, as his natural daughter; in 1760, on recovery from the birth of her sixth child, she undertook a journey to Camolin Park, Wexford, where he was lying ill, to induce him to acknowledge his marriage to her mother. She was repulsed with much indignity by the woman then claiming to be the earl's wife.

In 1761 the earl died, his estates devolving on the son of the wife in possession. Lady Dorothea then laid the whole story before the world in Poems by a Lady of Quality, which she dedicated to the king, and published by subscription at Dublin in 1764. In 1765 her mother died. In 1766 Dorothea published The Case of Ann, Countess of Anglesey, lately Deceased, appealing for help to prosecute her claims; with the same object she issued Theodora, a novel, in two volumes in 1770, dedicated to the Countess of Hertford. A writer in the Critical Review commented "as the ground-work of this novel has appeared lately in most of the news-papers, we think it needless to relate again the [Anglesey] story with fictitious names".

In 1771 she published The Divorce, a musical entertainment sung at Marylebone Gardens in 1772; and The Haunted Grove, another musical entertainment by her, not printed, was acted at Dublin. About 1772 she brought out The Lady's Polite Secretary, preceded by a Short English Grammar. Meanwhile, the Anglesey estates were subject to lawsuits from various sides, but none of them benefited Lady Dorothea.

She died in poverty in Grafton Street, Dublin, of an apoplectic fit, early in 1774.

== See also ==
History of English grammars
