= James Annesley, 3rd Earl of Anglesey =

James Annesley, 3rd Earl of Anglesey (3 Jul 1674–21 January 1702), succeeded to his Earldom on the death of his father, James Annesley, 2nd Earl of Anglesey in 1690, the same year in which he matriculated at Christ Church, Oxford. His mother was Lady Elizabeth Manners, daughter of John Manners, 8th Earl of Rutland. In October 1699 he married Lady Catherine Darnley, illegitimate daughter of James II of England by Catherine Sedley, Countess of Dorchester. They had a daughter, Lady Catherine Annesley, who married William Phipps and was an ancestress of the Baron Mulgrave.

The couple were legally separated in June 1701, on the grounds of Anglesey's cruelty to his wife. The earl, already suffering from consumption, died in the following January.

Peerage of England
| Preceded by James Annesley | Earl of Anglesey; 1690–1702 | Succeeded by John Annesley |
Peerage of Ireland
| Preceded by James Annesley | Viscount Valentia; 1690–1702 | Succeeded by John Annesley |
