= Henri de Massue, 1st Marquis de Rouvigny =

French diplomat

Henri de Massue, 1st Marquis de Rouvigny (1603–1689) was a French diplomat.

He was the eldest son of Daniel de Massue, Seigneur de Rouvigny and Madeleine de Pinot des Fontaines.

A Protestant, in 1647 Rouvigny married Marie, a daughter of Pierre Tallemant, and had two sons, Henri and Pierre.

Rouvigny served as the French ambassador to the English court from 1674 to 1677.

Rouvigny had a sister, Rachel, who married Thomas Wriothesley, 4th Earl of Southampton, and was the mother of Elizabeth Wriothesley, Viscountess Campden, wife of Edward Noel, 1st Earl of Gainsborough, and Rachel Wriothesley (c. 1636–1723), heiress of Bloomsbury, wife of William Russell, Lord Russell (1639–1683).

In September 1685, Rouvigny travelled to France, meaning to live out his days there, but within a short time he had returned as a refugee. He died in England in 1689.

His son Henri de Massue, 2nd Marquis de Rouvigny, was ennobled in the Peerage of Ireland first as the Viscount (1692) and later the Earl of Galway (1697), but died unmarried.
