= John Clapham =

John Clapham may refer to:

- John Clapham (historian and poet) (1566–1619), English historian and poet
- John Greaves Clapham (1790s–1854), businessman and political figure in Lower Canada and Canada East
- John Peele Clapham (1801–1875), English solicitor and justice of the peace
- John Harold Clapham (1873–1946), British economic historian
