= Elizabeth Wriothesley, Countess of Southampton =

English countess (1572–1655)

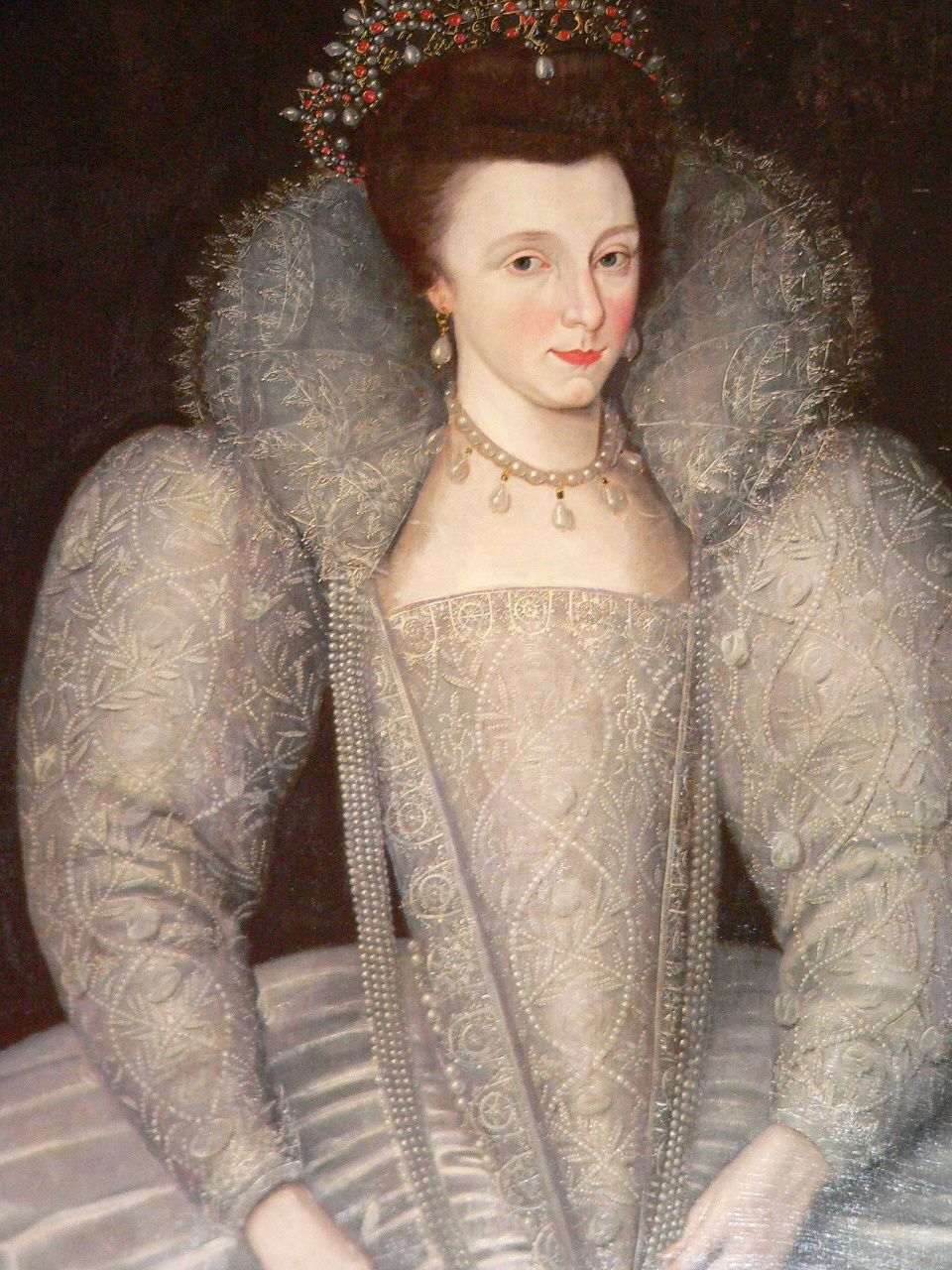
- Portrait of Elizabeth Vernon (c. 1590–1600) attributed to Marcus Gheeraerts the Younger
- Born: Elizabeth Vernon; 11 January 1572
- Died: 23 November 1655 (aged 83)
- Spouse: Henry Wriothesley, 3rd Earl of Southampton (m. 1598)
- Children: 4

Elizabeth Wriothesley (née Vernon), Countess of Southampton (11 January 1572 – 23 November 1655) was one of the chief ladies-in-waiting to Elizabeth I of England in the later years of her reign.

== Family ==
Elizabeth Vernon was the granddaughter of George Vernon (d. 1555), and the daughter of John Vernon (d. 1592) of Hodnet, Shropshire, by Elizabeth Devereux (c. 1541-c. 1583) the daughter of Sir Richard Devereux (d. 13 October 1547) of Weobley, Herefordshire, by his wife, Dorothy Hastings, daughter of George Hastings, 1st Earl of Huntingdon (1487–1544).

She was the sister of Sir Robert Vernon, Comptroller of the Household to Queen Elizabeth I, and of Susan Vernon, second wife of Sir Walter Leveson, and a first cousin of Robert Devereux, 2nd Earl of Essex.

Her paternal great-grandfather, Humphrey Vernon, was the grandson of John Talbot, 2nd Earl of Shrewsbury and his wife, Lady Elizabeth Butler, the daughter of James Butler, 4th Earl of Ormond. Humphrey's wife, Alice Ludlow, was the great-great-great-granddaughter of Henry IV of England through his son Humphrey, Duke of Gloucester.

By her mother, Elizabeth was the great-granddaughter of Walter Devereux, 1st Viscount Hereford and his wife Lady Mary Grey, daughter of Thomas Grey, 1st Marquess of Dorset and his wife Cecily Bonville. By her mother, Elizabeth was also a great-granddaughter of George Hastings, 1st Earl of Huntingdon and Lady Anne Stafford, daughter of Henry Stafford, 2nd Duke of Buckingham and his wife Lady Katherine Woodville.

== Marriage and children ==
On 30 August 1598, Elizabeth married Henry Wriothesley, 3rd Earl of Southampton (1573 – 1624), who has been suggested as the dedicatee of Shakespeare's Sonnets. The marriage occurred after Elizabeth realized that she was pregnant. Upon discovering this, the Queen had both Elizabeth and her husband locked in Fleet Prison and, after their release, the pair were never again received into her favour.

Later, when Elizabeth was pregnant she wrote to her husband asking him to buy her a stomacher of scarlet cloth lined with plush to keep her warm while riding, and bring his portrait 'very finely done'.

Elizabeth and Henry had several children, including:

1. Lady Penelope Wriothesley (18 November 1598 – 16 July 1667) who married William Spencer, 2nd Baron Spencer, by whom she had issue.
2. Lady Anne Wriothesley (born 1600) who married Robert Wallop of Farley Wallop.
3. James Wriothesley, Lord Wriothesley (1605–1624)
4. Thomas Wriothesley (10 March 1607 – 16 May 1667) who became the 4th Earl of Southampton and married firstly Rachel de Massue, daughter of Daniel de Massue, Seigneur de Ruvigny, by whom he had two daughters, Elizabeth (died 1679), who married Edward Noel (later created Earl of Gainsborough), and Rachel, Lady Russell.

Both her husband and eldest son died in November 1624 from illnesses which struck them while they were on a military expedition in the Netherlands. She died, aged 83, in 1655.

== Shakespeare connection theory ==
A German professor of English, Hildegard Hammerschmidt-Hummel, has proposed a theory, mainly based on an apocryphal sonnet that she claims was written by William Shakespeare, and evidence from portraits, that Elizabeth Wriothesley was a lover of the poet. Her eldest daughter Penelope is, according to this theory, a child of Shakespeare. The author stresses that in this way, Lady Diana Spencer would be a descendant of William Shakespeare. Questions have been raised about this theory, namely why the Earl of Southampton would have risked certain royal displeasure from the Queen by marrying Elizabeth if she was pregnant with somebody else's illegitimate child.

It has been suggested that she may be the 'Dark Lady' in the sonnets. It has also been argued that she may have partly inspired the character of Juliet in Romeo and Juliet.

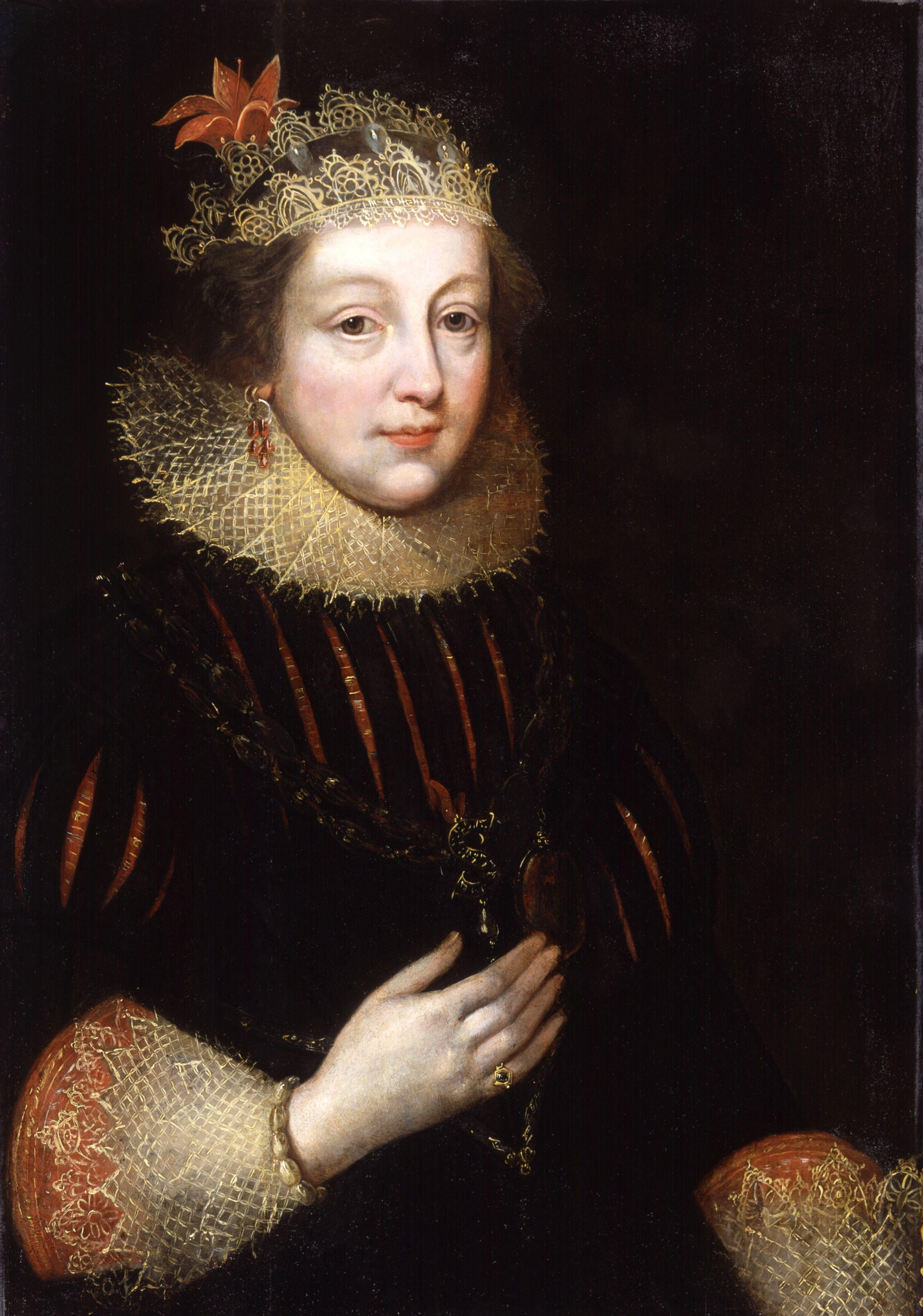
Elizabeth, Countess of Southampton c. 1620

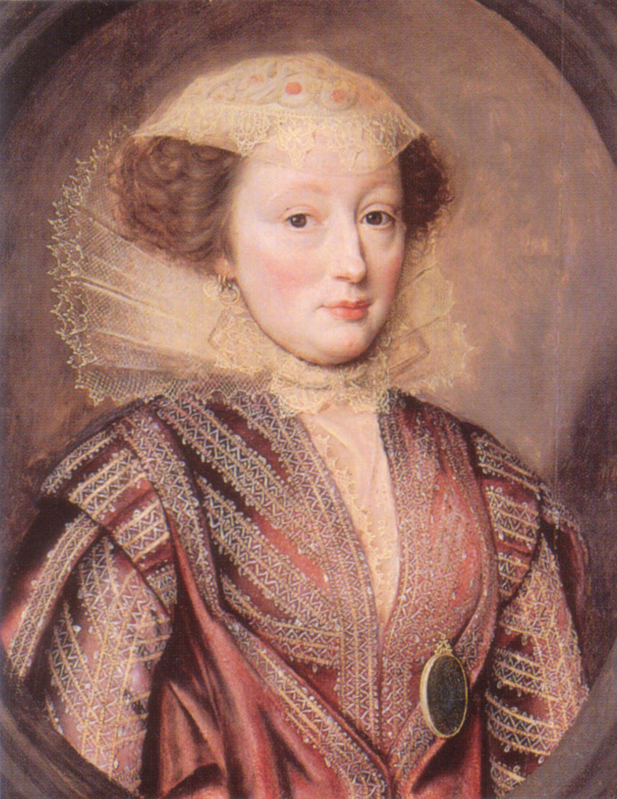
Elizabeth, Countess of Southampton, c. 1618
