= Custos Rotulorum of Rutland =

This is a list of people who have served as Custos Rotulorum of Rutland.

- Sir Edward Montagu bef. 1544–1557
- Kenelm Digby bef. 1558–1590
- Thomas Cecil, 1st Earl of Exeter bef. 1594–1623
- George Villiers, 1st Duke of Buckingham 1623–1628
- Edward Noel, 2nd Viscount Campden 1628–1643
- Interregnum
- Baptist Noel, 3rd Viscount Campden 1660–1682
- Edward Noel, 1st Earl of Gainsborough 1682–1689
- Bennet Sherard, 2nd Baron Sherard 1690–1700

For later custodes rotulorum, see Lord Lieutenant of Rutland.
