= Custos Rotulorum of Hampshire =

This is a list of people who have served as Custos Rotulorum of Hampshire.

- William Paulet, 1st Marquess of Winchester bef. 1544 – aft. 1558
- John Paulet, 2nd Marquess of Winchester bef. 1562–1576
- Sir Francis Walsingham bef. 1577–1590
- George Carey, 2nd Baron Hunsdon bef. 1594–1603
- Henry Wriothesley, 3rd Earl of Southampton bef. 1605–1624
- Sir Henry Wallop 1624–1642
- Thomas Wriothesley, 4th Earl of Southampton 1642–1646, 1660–1667
- Joceline Percy, 11th Earl of Northumberland 1667–1670
- Charles Paulet, 6th Marquess of Winchester 1670–1676
- James Annesley, Baron Annesley 1676–1681
- Edward Noel, 1st Earl of Gainsborough 1681–1688
- James FitzJames, 1st Duke of Berwick 1688

For later custodes rotulorum, see Lord Lieutenant of Hampshire.
