= James Annesley, 2nd Earl of Anglesey =

British peer

James Annesley 2nd Earl of Anglesey
- Earl of Anglesey
- Tenure: 6 April 1686 – 1 April 1690
- Predecessor: Arthur Annesley, 1st Earl of Anglesey
- Successor: James Annesley, 3rd Earl of Anglesey
- Other titles: Viscount Valentia, Baron Mountnorris, Baron Annesley
- Born: c. 1645
- Died: 1 April 1690 (aged 45)
- Offices: Member of Parliament for Winchester; Custos Rotulorum of Hampshire
- Spouse: Lady Elizabeth Manners
- Issue: James Annesley, 3rd Earl of Anglesey; John Annesley, 4th Earl of Anglesey; Arthur Annesley, 5th Earl of Anglesey
- Parents: Arthur Annesley, 1st Earl of Anglesey and Elizabeth Altham

James Annesley, 2nd Earl of Anglesey FRS (c. 1645 – 1 April 1690), styled Lord Annesley from 1661 to 1686, was an English peer.

He was the son of Arthur Annesley, 1st Earl of Anglesey and Elizabeth Altham. He matriculated at Christ Church, Oxford University, on 4 December 1661.

He married Lady Elizabeth Manners, daughter of John Manners, 8th Earl of Rutland and Frances Montagu, on 17 September 1669. They had children:

- James Annesley, 3rd Earl of Anglesey (13 July 1674 - 21 January 1701/2);
- John Annesley, 4th Earl of Anglesey (18 January 1676 - 18 September 1710);
- Arthur Annesley, 5th Earl of Anglesey (1677, 1683 - 1 April 1737).

He died intestate and the administration of his estate in England and Ireland, with a value estimated at £4,000 per annum, was granted to his widow on 6 June 1690.

He was briefly a Whig member of parliament for County Waterford in 1666, after his brother-in-law, Richard Power succeeded in his father's (Irish) peerage. He was elected to the English seat of Winchester in the parliaments of May and October 1679, and again in 1681. He was a Justice of the Peace for Hampshire and Surrey (1674–81), colonel of the Hampshire militia (1675–81), Custos Rotulorum of Hampshire(1675–81) and a Deputy Lieutenant of Hampshire (1680–81).

On 6 April 1686 Annesley succeeded to his father's peerages of Baron Mountnorris and Earl of Anglesey, in Wales [E., 1661], Baron Annesley, of Newport Pagnel, Buckinghamshire [E., 1661] and Viscount Valentia.

Parliament of England
Preceded by Lawrence Hyde; Sir Robert Holmes	Member of Parliament for Winchester; 1679–1681; With: Sir John Cloberry	Succeeded by Roger L'Estrange; Charles Hanses
Honorary titles
Preceded by The Marquess of Winchester	Custos Rotulorum of Hampshire; 1676–1681	Succeeded by The Lord Noel
Peerage of England
Preceded by Arthur Annesley	Earl of Anglesey; 1686–1690	Succeeded by James Annesley
Peerage of Ireland
Preceded by Arthur Annesley	Viscount Valentia; 1686–1690	Succeeded by James Annesley
