= Thomas Wriothesley, 4th Earl of Southampton =

English politician

The Right Honourable The Earl of Southampton KG
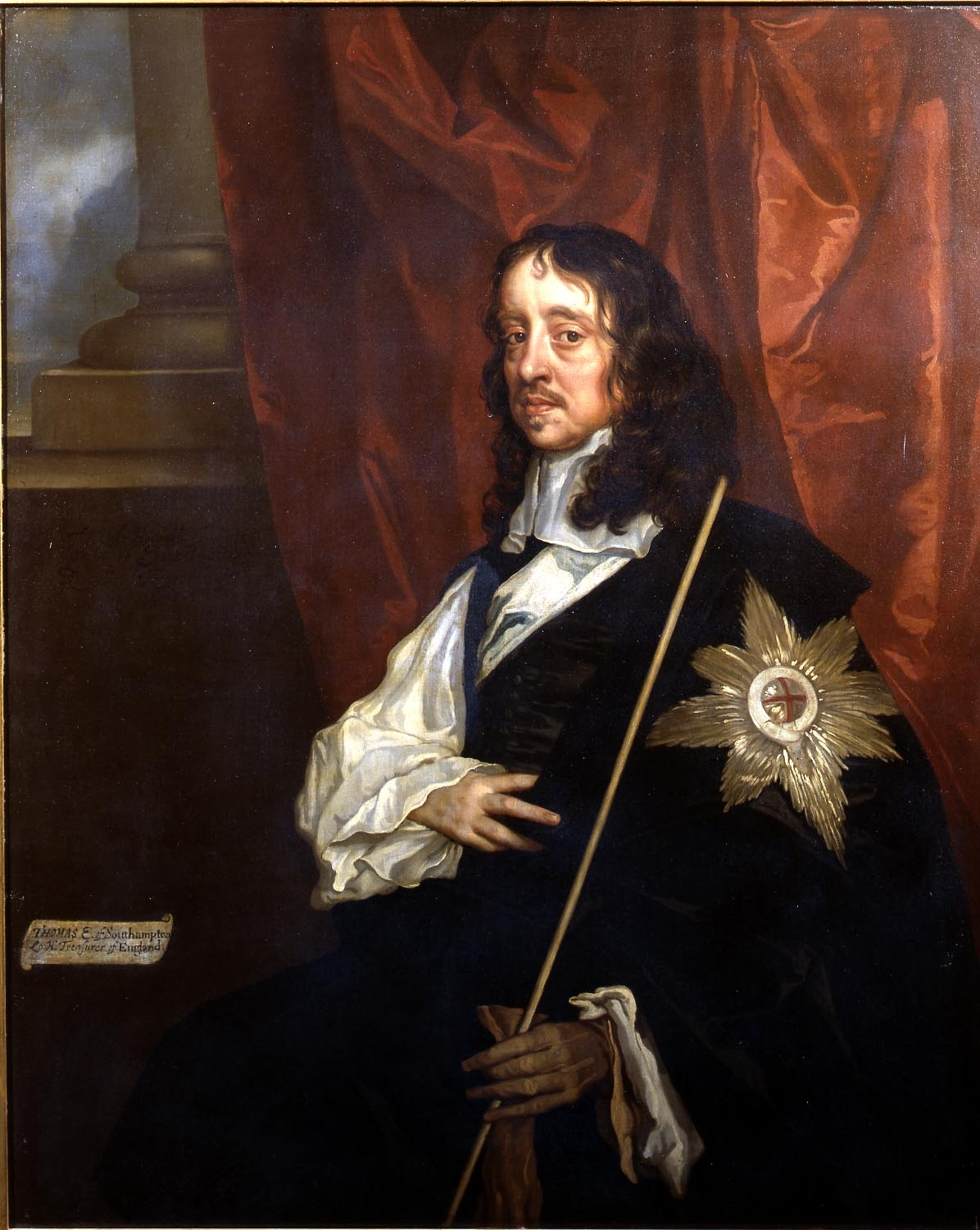
- Thomas Wriothesley, 4th Earl of Southampton, wearing his Garter Star and holding his Staff of Office as Lord High Treasurer. Portrait by School of Sir Peter Lely
- Tenure: 1624-1667
- Predecessor: Henry Wriothesley, 3rd Earl of Southampton
- Other titles: Earl of Chichester; Lord Wriothesley
- Born: 10 March 1607
- Died: 16 May 1667 (aged 60)
- Offices: Lord High Treasurer
- Spouses: Rachel de Massue; Lady Elizabeth Leigh; Frances Seymour
- Parents: Henry Wriothesley, 3rd Earl of Southampton; Elizabeth Vernon

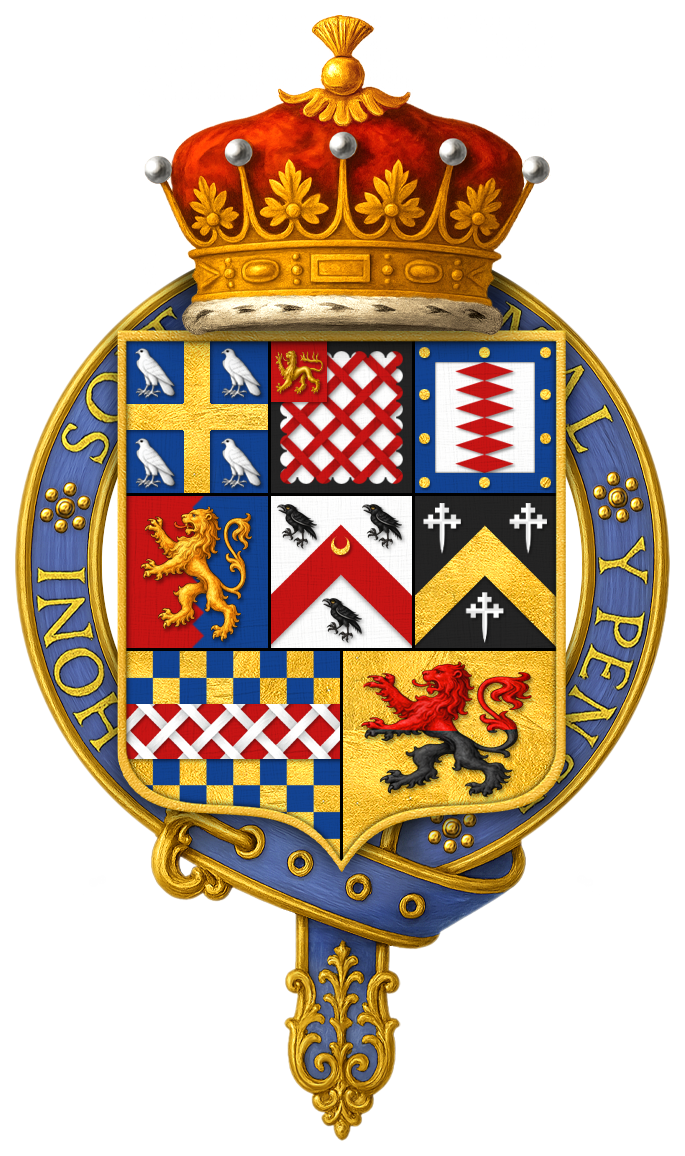
Quartered arms of Thomas Wriothesley, 4th Earl of Southampton, KG

Thomas Wriothesley, 4th Earl of Southampton, KG (/ˈraɪəθsli/ RY-əth-slee; 10 March 1607 – 16 May 1667), styled Lord Wriothesley before 1624, was an English statesman, a staunch supporter of King Charles II who after the Restoration of the Monarchy in 1660 rose to the position of Lord High Treasurer, which term began with the assumption of power by the Clarendon Ministry. He "was remarkable for his freedom from any taint of corruption and for his efforts in the interests of economy and financial order", a noble if not a completely objective view of his work as the keeper of the nation's finances. He died before the impeachment of Lord Clarendon, after which the Cabal Ministry took over government.

== Origins ==
He was the only surviving son of Henry Wriothesley, 3rd Earl of Southampton (1573–1624) by his wife Elizabeth Vernon (1572–1655), a daughter of John Vernon (died 1592) of Hodnet, Shropshire. In 1545 King Henry VIII granted to his ancestor Thomas Wriothesley, 1st Earl of Southampton, Chancellor of England, the manor of Bloomsbury (now in Central London), which descended by the 4th Earl's second daughter and heiress to the Russell family, and is now part of the Bedford Estate. The Wriothesley family is commemorated today by Southampton Row and Southampton Street in Holborn, within the historic estate.

== Career ==
He was educated at Eton College and St John's College, Cambridge.

He succeeded to the earldom following deaths of both his father and his older brother James in the Netherlands in December 1624. At first, he sided with the Parliament supporters upon the controversies leading to the English Civil War, but upon his realisation of their propensity to violence, he became a loyal supporter of King Charles I. While remaining very loyal to the deposed monarch, he still worked for peace and represented the king at the peace conferences in 1643 and one at Uxbridge in 1645. He was allowed to remain in England, having paid fines to the Committee for Compounding with Delinquents of more than £6,000.

Several months after the Restoration of the Monarchy in 1660, Lord Southampton was appointed Lord High Treasurer (8 September 1660), a position he occupied until his death. Samuel Pepys admired Southampton's integrity and the stoicism with which he endured his painful last illness, but clearly had doubts about his competence as Treasurer; in particular, he recorded Southampton's despairing words to him, having been asked to raise more funds at a Council meeting in April 1665: "Why, what means all this, Mr. Pepys? This is true, you say, but what would you have me do? I have given all I can for my life. Why will not people lend their money?" However Pepys admitted that Sir William Coventry, the colleague he most admired, was himself an admirer of Southampton, whom he described as "a great statesman". Coventry recalled that other ministers would joke that regardless of his complaints that it was "impossible" to find money, Southampton always succeeded in the end. Southampton however once grimly remarked that "Impossible will be found impossible at the last", an accurate prophecy of the crisis of 1672 which led to the Stop of the Exchequer.

== Marriages and issue ==
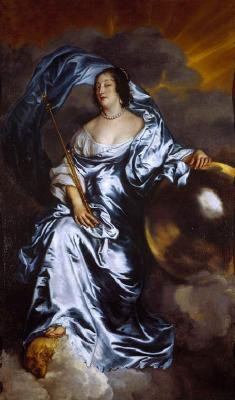
Rachel de Massue, first wife of Thomas Wriothesley, 4th Earl of Southampton, portrait c.1638 by van Dyck

He married thrice and had three daughters:

- Firstly to Rachel de Massue (1603 – 16 February 1640), a French Huguenot and an aunt of Henri de Massue, Marquis de Ruvigny, 1st Viscount Galway. By Rachel he had two daughters and co-heiresses:
  - Elizabeth Wriothesley, Viscountess Campden, wife of Edward Noel, 1st Earl of Gainsborough, 4th Viscount Campden (1641–1689) (created Earl of Gainsborough in 1682)
  - Rachel Wriothesley, heiress of Bloomsbury, wife of William Russell, Lord Russell (1639–1683), third son of William Russell, 1st Duke of Bedford. The eventual heir to all the estates of her father Thomas Wriothesley, 4th Earl of Southampton, was her only son Wriothesley Russell, 2nd Duke of Bedford (1680–1711).
- Secondly he married Lady Elizabeth Leigh, daughter of Francis Leigh, 1st Earl of Chichester from whom he inherited the title Earl of Chichester. By Elizabeth Leigh he had a further daughter:
  - Elizabeth Wriothesley (1646–1690) who married twice, firstly to Joceline Percy, 11th Earl of Northumberland (1644–1670), whom she bore an only surviving child, heiress to the vast Percy estates, Lady Elizabeth Percy (1667–1722) (Duchess of Somerset) who married Charles Seymour, 6th Duke of Somerset (1662–1748). She married secondly Ralph Montagu, 1st Duke of Montagu.
- Thirdly he married Lady Frances Seymour, a daughter of William Seymour, 2nd Duke of Somerset (1587–1660) by his second wife Lady Frances Devereux. They had no children.

Political offices
Preceded by The Earl of Portland; The 1st Duke of Richmond	Lord Lieutenant of Hampshire jointly with The Earl of Portland; The 1st Duke of Richmond; 1641–1646	English Interregnum
Preceded by Sir Henry Wallop	Custos Rotulorum of Hampshire; 1642–1646	English Interregnum
In commission Sir Edward Hyde as First Lord Title last held by The Lord Cottington	Lord High Treasurer; 1660–1667	In commission The Duke of Albemarle as First Lord Title next held by The Lord Clifford of Chudleigh
Honorary titles
English Interregnum	Custos Rotulorum of Hampshire; 1660–1667	Succeeded by Lord Percy
English Interregnum	Lord Lieutenant of Norfolk; 1660–1661	Succeeded by The Lord Townshend
English Interregnum	Lord Lieutenant of Hampshire; 1660–1667	Succeeded by Lord St John
Preceded by The Duke of Somerset	Lord Lieutenant of Wiltshire; 1661–1667	Succeeded by The Earl of Clarendon
Preceded by The Lord Windsor	Lord Lieutenant of Worcestershire; 1662–1663	Succeeded by The Lord Windsor
Preceded by The Earl of Winchilsea	Lord Lieutenant of Kent; 1662–1667	Succeeded by The Earl of Winchilsea; The 3rd Duke of Richmond
Peerage of England
Preceded by Henry Wriothesley	Earl of Southampton; 1624–1667	Extinct
Preceded by Francis Leigh	Earl of Chichester; 1653–1667	Extinct
