= Henry Wriothesley, 3rd Earl of Southampton =

17th-century English noble

The Right Honourable The Earl of Southampton KG
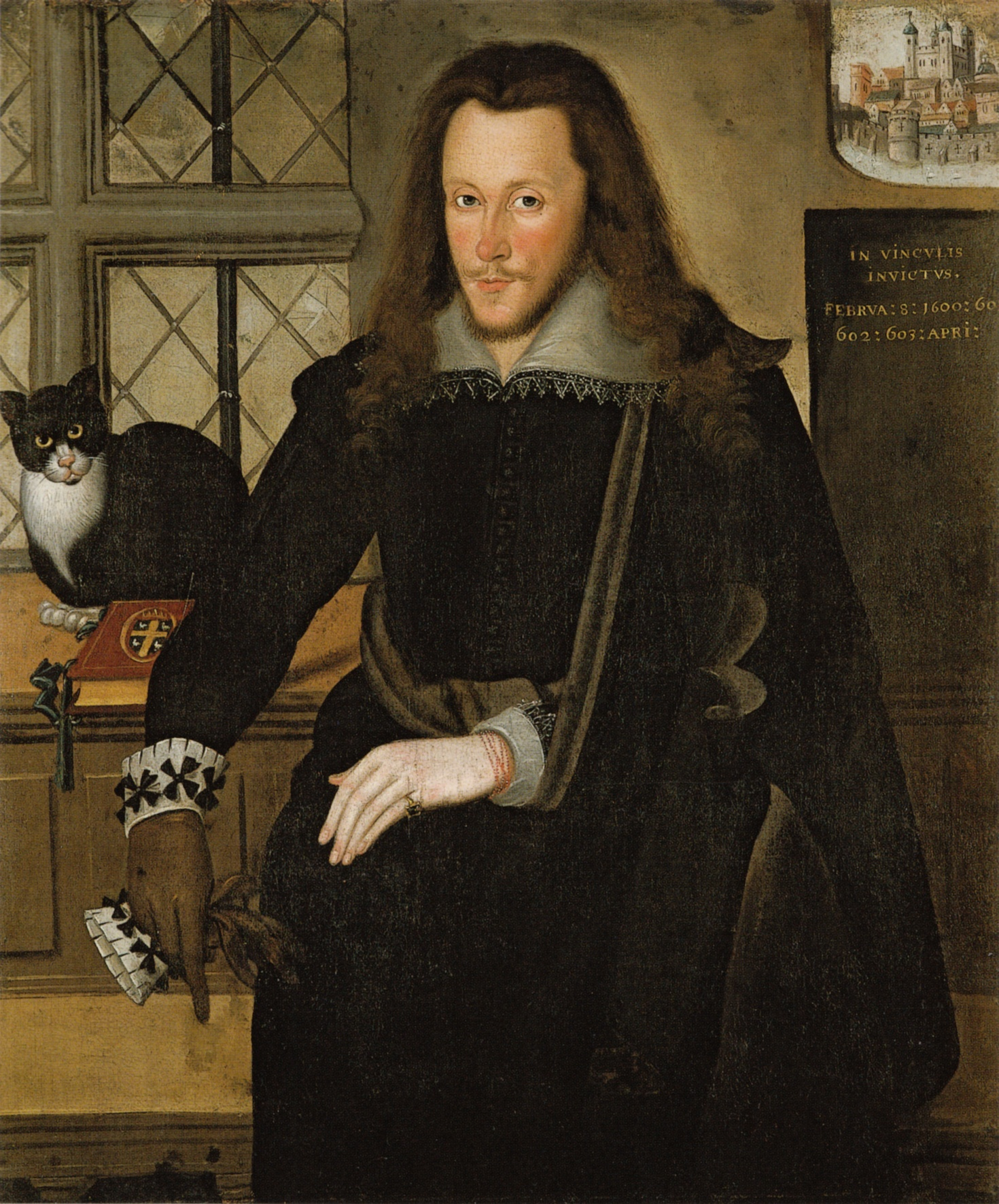

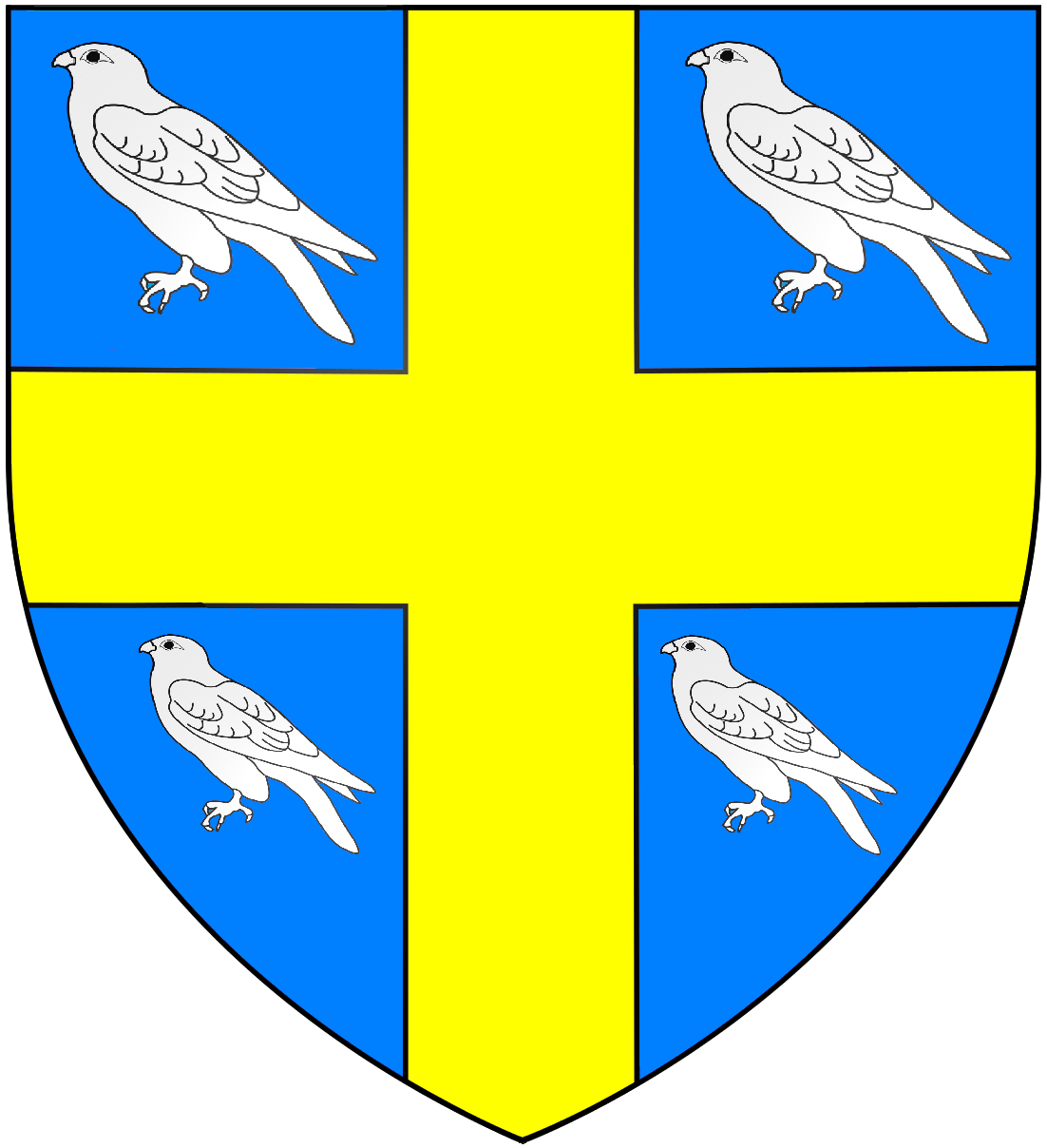
- Coat of arms
- Tenure: 1581–1624
- Predecessor: Henry Wriothesley, 2nd Earl of Southampton
- Successor: Thomas Wriothesley, 4th Earl of Southampton
- Born: 6 October 1573; Cowdray House, Sussex, England
- Died: 10 November 1624 (aged 51); Bergen op Zoom, Dutch Republic
- Spouse: Elizabeth Vernon (m. 1598)
- Issue: Penelope Wriothesley; James Wriothesley, Lord Wriothesley; Thomas Wriothesley, 4th Earl of Southampton; Anne Wriothesley
- Father: Henry Wriothesley, 2nd Earl of Southampton
- Mother: Mary Browne

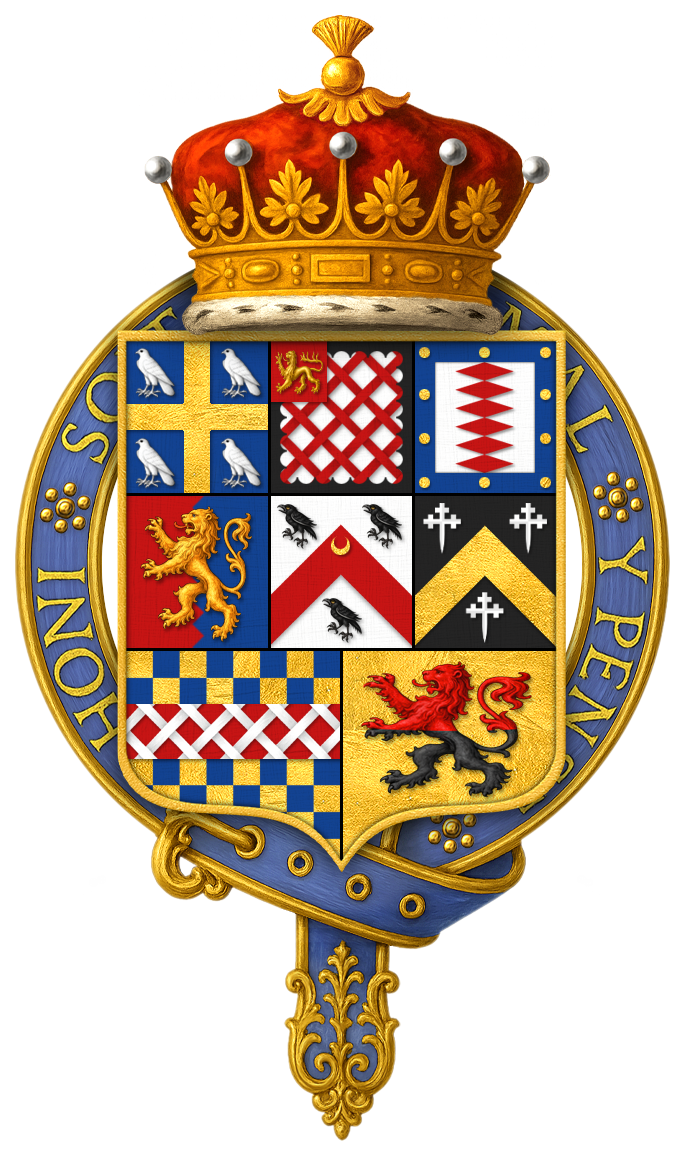
Quartered arms of Sir Henry Wriothesley, 3rd Earl of Southampton, KG: Quarterly of four: Azure, a cross or between four hawks close argent (Wriothesley); 2nd: Argent, a fret gules on a canton of the second a lion passant or (unknown); 3rd: Argent, five fusils conjoined in pale gules a bordure azure bezantée (unknown); 4th: Per pale indented gules and azure, a lion rampant or

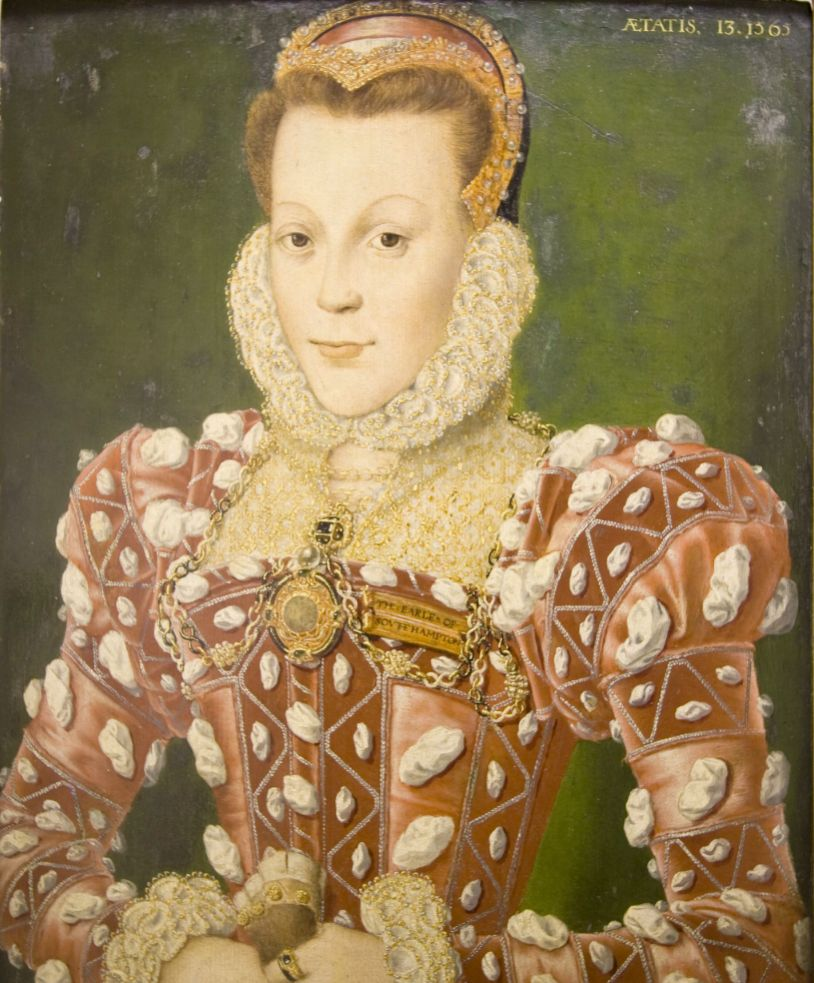
Southampton's mother, Mary Wriothesley, Countess of Southampton (1552–1607)

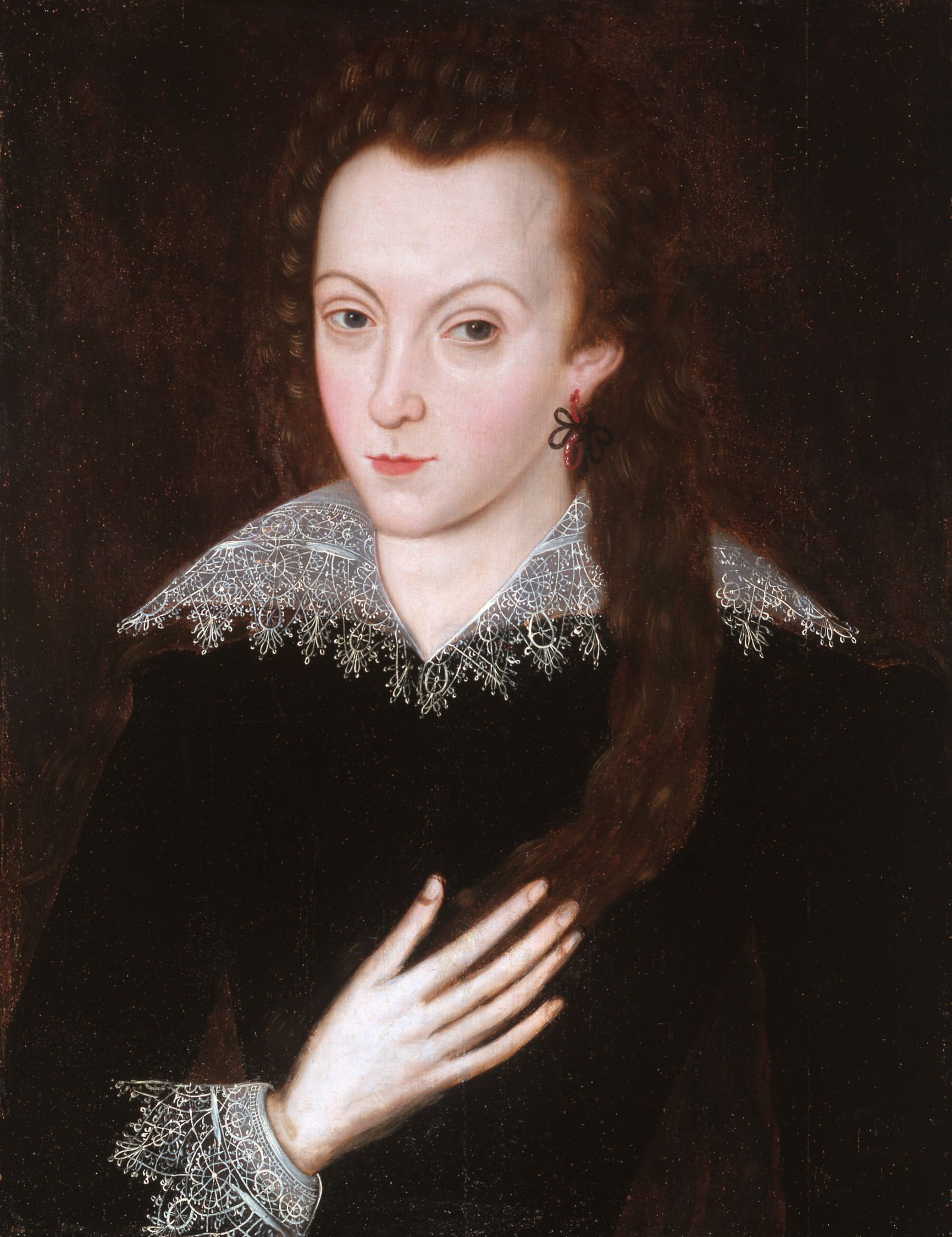
Southampton in his teens, c. 1590–1593, attributed to John de Critz

Henry Wriothesley, 3rd Earl of Southampton, KG (pronunciation uncertain: /ˈrɛzli/ "Rezley", /ˈraɪzli/ "Rizely" (archaic), /ˈrɒtsli/ (present-day) and /ˈraɪəθsli/ have been suggested; 6 October 1573 – 10 November 1624), was the only son of Henry Wriothesley, 2nd Earl of Southampton, and Mary Browne, daughter of the 1st Viscount Montagu. William Shakespeare's two narrative poems, Venus and Adonis and The Rape of Lucrece, were dedicated to Southampton, who is frequently identified as the Fair Youth of Shakespeare's Sonnets.

== Family ==
Henry Wriothesley, born 6 October 1573 at Cowdray House, Sussex, was the only son of Henry Wriothesley, 2nd Earl of Southampton, by Mary Browne. She was the only daughter of Anthony Browne, 1st Viscount Montague, and his first wife, Jane Radcliffe. He had two sisters, Jane, who died before 1573, and Mary (c. 1567–1607), who in June 1585 married Thomas Arundell, 1st Baron Arundell of Wardour.

After his father's death, Southampton's mother married firstly, on 2 May 1594, as her second husband, Sir Thomas Heneage (d. 17 October 1595), Vice-Chamberlain of the Household. After being widowed again, she married, between 5 November 1598 and 31 January 1599, Sir William Hervey. She died in November 1607.

== Early life ==
When his father died on 4 October 1581, Southampton inherited the earldom and landed income valued at £1,097 6s per annum. He became a royal ward until late 1590 (Court of Wards and Liveries). His wardship and marriage were sold by the Queen to her kinsman, Charles, Lord Howard of Effingham, for £1,000. According to Akrigg, Howard "entered into some further agreement, of which no documentation can now be found, which transferred to Lord Burghley personally the custody and marriage of the young Earl, but left Howard holding his lands." Late in 1581 or early in 1582 Southampton, then eight years of age, went to live at Cecil House in the Strand.

In October 1585, at age twelve, Southampton entered St John's College, Cambridge, graduating M.A. on 6 June 1589. His name was entered at the Gray's Inn legal society before he left the university, and he was admitted on 29 February 1588.

On Southampton's 16th birthday, 6 October 1589, Lord Burghley noted Southampton's age in his diary. By 1590 Burghley was negotiating with Southampton's grandfather, Anthony Browne, 1st Viscount Montague, and Southampton's mother, Mary, for a marriage between Southampton and Lord Burghley's eldest granddaughter, Elizabeth Vere, daughter of Burghley's daughter, Anne Cecil, and Edward de Vere, 17th Earl of Oxford. But Southampton did not like the match and, in a letter written in November 1594, about six weeks after Southampton had turned 21, the Jesuit Henry Garnet reported the rumour that "The young Erle of Southampton refusing the Lady Veere payeth £5000 of present payment".

In 1591, Lord Burghley's Clerk in Chancery, John Clapham, dedicated to Southampton a poem in Latin, Narcissus, recounting the Greek legend of a beautiful young man who perishes through self-love. According to Akrigg, Southampton was now spending much of his time at court. He was in attendance when Queen Elizabeth visited the University of Oxford in late September 1592 and was praised in the Latin poem written by John Sandford to commemorate the queen's visit.

In October 1592 Southampton's grandfather, Viscount Montague, died. Montague had been a Knight of the Garter, and on 3 May 1593, Philip Gawdy of Clifford's Inn (a law school and Inn of Chancery) wrote to his brother, Bassingbourne Gawdy II, that Southampton had been nominated to the Order, together with the Lord Keeper, Lord Burgh, and Lord Willoughby de Eresby. Shortly thereafter, in his Honour of the Garter dated 26 June 1593, George Peele referred to him as "Gentle Wriothesley, Southampton's star", claiming erroneously that an Earl of Southampton had been among the founding Knights. However, it was not until 1603 that Southampton was invested in the Order under King James.

== Southampton and Shakespeare ==
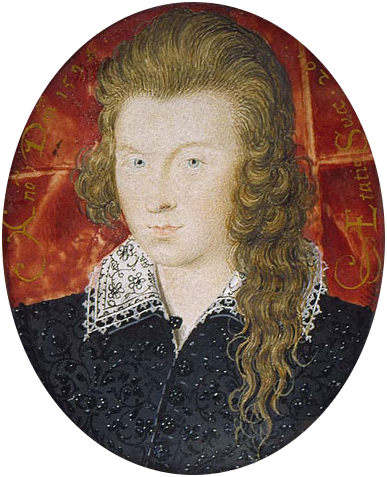
Henry Wriothesley age 21

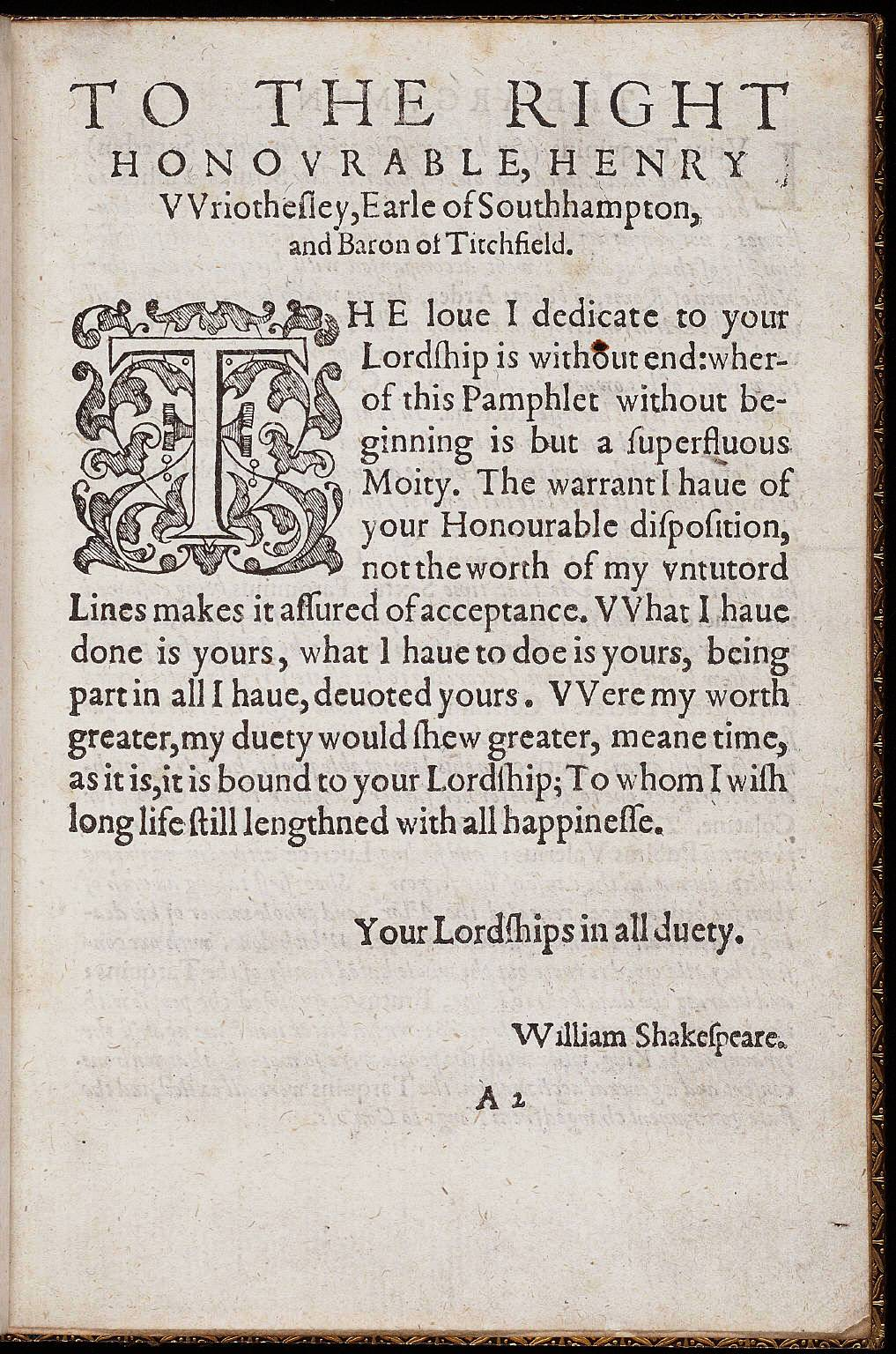
Shakespeare's dedication to Southampton of The Rape of Lucrece, 1594

In 1593 Shakespeare dedicated his narrative poem Venus and Adonis to Southampton, followed in 1594 by The Rape of Lucrece. Although the dedication to Venus and Adonis is more restrained, the dedication to The Rape of Lucrece is couched in extravagant terms:

The love I dedicate to your lordship is without end ... What I have done is yours; what I have to do is yours; being part in all I have, devoted yours.

This type of vaunting language was not particularly unusual, however, because other dedications of the day always excessively praised any noble person sponsoring the author's work – mainly for political and, above all, financial reasons.

Nathan Drake, in Shakespeare and his Times (1817), was the first to suggest that Southampton was not only the dedicatee of Shakespeare's two long narrative poems, but also the "Fair Youth" of the Sonnets. The title page refers to the "onlie begetter of these insuing sonnets Mr W.H.," and it had earlier been inferred that the Sonnets were addressed to "Mr. W.H.". Drake, however, adopting Chalmers' suggestion that one meaning of "beget" is "bring forth", argued that Mr. W.H. was the procurer of the manuscript rather than the "Fair Youth" addressed in the poems. Confirmation of this as also that "Mr. W.H." was the William Hervey who married Southampton's mother and inherited 'her goods' is provided by Edward Chaney. Other adherents of the theory that Southampton was the addressee of the Sonnets have suggested that his initials, H.W. (Henry Wriothesley), were simply reversed by the publisher to conceal his identity. Academic Park Honan argues that although Southampton

may be involved in Shakespeare's sonnets ... there is no real likelihood that he traduced him by drawing his portrait as the fickle, treacherous Young Man of the sonnets, who is implicitly "lascivious" (sonnet 95), "sensual" to a "fault" or to his "shame" (sonnets 34, 35), and ridden with vices.

Despite extensive archival research, no documents have been found concerning their relationship apart from the dedications to Shakespeare's two long narrative poems. Nicholas Rowe, on the authority of poet and playwright William Davenant (1606 – 7 April 1668), stated in his Life of Shakespeare that Southampton once gave Shakespeare £1,000 to "go through with a purchase", but Honan terms this a myth.

== The 1590s ==
Southampton received dedications from other writers in the 1590s. On 27 June 1593 Thomas Nashe completed his picaresque novel, The Unfortunate Traveller, and dedicated it to Southampton, terming him "a dere lover and cherisher ... as well of the lovers of Poets, as of Poets themselves", and in 1593 Barnabe Barnes published Parthenophil and Parthenope with a dedicatory sonnet to Southampton. In 1595 Gervase Markham included a dedicatory sonnet to Southampton in The Most Honorable Tragedy of Richard Grinvile, Knight. On 2 March 1596 John Florio's Italian/English dictionary was entered in the Stationers' Register. In his dedication, Florio, who was for some years in the Earl's "pay and patronage", complimented Southampton on his fluency in Italian, saying he "had become so complete a master of Italian as to have no need of travel abroad to perfect his mastery of that tongue". In 1597 Henry Lok included a sonnet to Southampton among the sixty dedicatory sonnets in his Sundry Christian Passions. In the same year William Burton dedicated to him a translation of Achilles Tatius's, Clitophon and Leucippe.

On 4 October 1594 Southampton's friend, Sir Henry Danvers, shot Henry Long, brother of Sir Walter Long, in the course of a local feud between the Danvers and Long families. Sir Henry and his elder brother, Sir Charles Danvers, fled to Titchfield, where Southampton sheltered them. The brothers were outlawed, and eventually escaped to the continent where they took refuge at the court of King Henri IV.

On 17 November 1595, Southampton jousted in Queen Elizabeth's accession day tournament, earning a mention in George Peele's Anglorum Feriae as "gentle and debonaire". However, according to Akrigg, "Gentle and debonair he may have been, but we never again hear of Southampton being high in the graces of Queen Elizabeth".

On 13 April 1596 the Queen specifically instructed Robert Devereux, 2nd Earl of Essex, not to take either Southampton or the Earl of Derby with him on an expedition for the Relief of Calais, and it also appears that Southampton did not accompany Essex on the Cadiz Expedition that summer. In February 1597 Southampton challenged the Earl of Northumberland to a duel with rapiers, requiring intervention by the Queen and Privy Council, and on 1 March stood godfather at the christening of Sir Robert Sidney's daughter, Bridget. Later that year Southampton was with Essex on his "inglorious" Voyage to the Azores, where according to Rowland Whyte, "My Lord of Southampton fought with one of the Kings great Men of Warre, and suncke her". On his return, he made his first appearance in the House of Lords on 5 November, and was put on several committees, but became a "chronic absentee". By this time he was in serious financial difficulties, and had turned over administration of his estates to two trustees, who by the end of the year had sold some of his lands.

In 1598 Southampton was involved in a brawl at court with Ambrose Willoughby, one of the Queen's esquires of the body, who had ordered him to leave the presence chamber where he was playing the card game primero after the Queen had retired for the evening. Southampton struck Willoughby, and "Willoughby puld of some of his locke", for which the Queen gave Willoughby thanks, saying "he had done better yf he had sent hym to the porters lodge, to see who durst have fetcht hym out". There is a suggestion that underlying the altercation was something Willoughby had said which caused trouble between Southampton and his mistress, Elizabeth Vernon, one of the Queen's Maids of Honour. The Queen forbade Southampton to present himself at court, although he was soon allowed back. Nonetheless, it was reported by Rowland Whyte at the beginning of February that "My Lord of Southampton is much troubled at her Majesties straungest Usage of hym". Faced with his financial difficulties and the Queen's disfavour, Southampton determined to live abroad for a time, and seized the opportunity of accompanying Sir Robert Cecil on an embassy to Henri IV of France. On 6 February Southampton was granted licence to travel abroad for two years, and by March he and Cecil were in Angers, where on 7 March Southampton was presented to the French King.

When Cecil returned to England from his failed mission in April, Southampton remained at the French court, planning to travel to Italy with Sir Charles Danvers and Sir Henry Danvers, whom he had helped to escape from England in 1594 after the murder of Henry Long. At that juncture, the Queen decided to pardon the Danvers brothers, and they were back in England on 30 August 1598, at which time Southampton also returned in secret, and married his pregnant mistress, Elizabeth Vernon. He left for the continent almost immediately, but by 3 September the Queen had learned of the marriage and consigned Elizabeth Vernon, one of her chief ladies-in-waiting, to the Fleet Prison for marrying without royal permission.

The Queen ordered Southampton to return to England forthwith, but he remained in Paris for two months, losing large sums in gambling. By the beginning of November, he was back in England, also lodged in the Fleet, where he remained for a month, during which time Elizabeth Vernon gave birth to a daughter, Penelope. To add to his difficulties, Southampton was at this time involved in a dispute with his mother, the Dowager Countess, over her prospective marriage to Sir William Hervey. Lord Henry Howard was brought in to smooth matters between mother and son, and the Countess and Hervey were wed in early January 1599.

In 1599, during the Nine Years' War (1595–1603), Southampton went to Ireland with Essex, who made him General of the Horse, but the Queen insisted that the appointment be cancelled. Southampton remained on in personal attendance upon the Earl, rather than as an officer. However, Southampton was active during the campaign and prevented a defeat at the hands of the Irish rebels when his cavalry drove off an attack at Arklow in County Wicklow. Shortly after the Essex's Rebellion in February 1601, William Reynolds, a soldier who had served with Essex in Ireland in 1599, mentioned Southampton in a letter to Sir Robert Cecil. Speaking of certain men involved in the Essex rebellion who had not yet been arrested, Reynolds wrote:

I do mervell also what becam of pearse edmones, the earle of Essex man, borne in strand neare me, and which has had many rewards & preferments by the earle essex, his villany I have often complained of, he dweles in London, he was corporall generall of the horse in Ierland under the earle of Sowthamton, he eate & drank at his table and lay in his tente, the earle of Sowthamton gave him a horse, which edmones refused a 100 markes for him, the earle Sowthamton would cole and huge him in his armes and play wantonly with him. This pearse began to fawne and flatter me in Ierland offering me great curtesie, telling me what pay grases & giftes they earles bestowed uppon him, therby seming to move and anymate me to desiar and looke for the like favour, But I coeld never love & afecte them to make them my frends, esspecially essex whoes mynd I ever mistrusted....

According to Duncan-Jones, Reynolds' letter hints that 'rewards could be obtained from either or both of the two Earls in return for sexual favours'. On the other hand, Duncan-Jones concludes that Reynolds may have been a paranoid schizophrenic, and that by his own statement he had written over 200 letters to the Queen, Privy Council, and members of the clergy wherein he had "complaynid of al the abewses and vilent oppresseones & sodometicall sines over flowing this land".

On his return from Ireland, Southampton attracted notice as a playgoer. "My Lord Southampton and Lord Rutland," wrote Rowland Whyte to Sir Robert Sydney in 1599, "come not to the court: the one doth but very seldom. They pass away the time in London merely in going to plays every day".

Southampton was deeply involved in Essex's Rebellion of 1601, and in February of that year, he was sentenced to death. Cecil, who urged the Queen to show the greatest possible degree of clemency, obtained the commutation of his penalty to life imprisonment.

== Life under King James ==
Restitution of the Earl of Southampton Act 1603
- Act of Parliament
- Parliament of England
- Long title: An Act for restitution of Henry earl of Southampton.
- Citation: 1 Jas. 1. c. 3 Pr.
- Territorial extent: England and Wales

Dates
- Royal assent: 7 July 1604
- Commencement: 19 March 1604 (Note: Start of session.)

Status: Current legislation

Southampton c. 1600

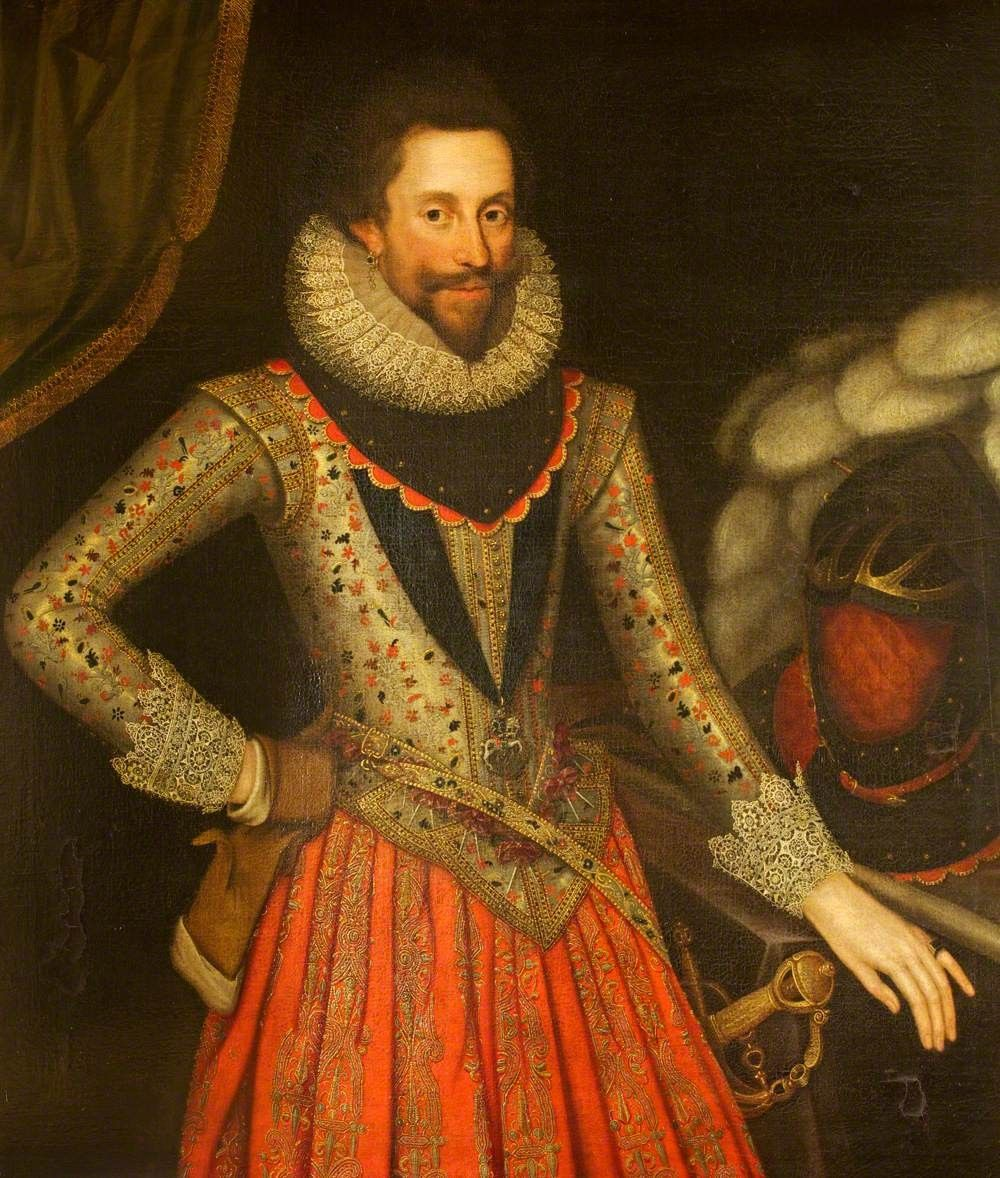
Southampton

On the accession of James I Southampton resumed his place at court and received numerous honours from the new king. His first task was to organise the large lavish celebrations including a feast and ball which were laid on at the Palace of Whitehall following the signing of the Treaty of London with Spain.

On the eve of the abortive rebellion of Essex, Southampton had induced the players at the Globe Theatre to revive Richard II. After his release from prison in 1603, he resumed his connection with the stage. In January 1605, he entertained Queen Anne at Southampton House with a performance of Love's Labour's Lost by Burbage and his company, to which Shakespeare belonged.

Southampton seems to have been a born fighter, and engaged in more than one serious quarrel at court, being imprisoned for a short time in 1603 following a heated argument with Lord Grey of Wilton in front of Queen Anne. Grey, an implacable opponent of the Essex faction, was later implicated in the Main Plot and Bye Plot. Southampton was in more serious disgrace in 1621 for his determined opposition to Buckingham. He was a volunteer on the Protestant side in Germany in 1614, and in 1617 he proposed to fit out an expedition against the Barbary pirates.

Southampton was a leader among the Jacobean aristocrats who turned to modern investment practices – "in industry, in modernizing their estates and in overseas trade and colonization".

He financed the first tinplate mill in the country, and founded an ironworks at Titchfield. He developed his properties in London, in Bloomsbury and Holborn; he revamped his country estates, participated in the efforts of the East India Company and the New England Company, and backed Henry Hudson's search for the Northwest Passage.

Henry Timberlake, a member of the Company of Merchant Adventurers of London, also was active in the East India Company and may have been involved in Southampton's activities in Titchfield. He died there in 1625 and was buried in St. Peter's parish church.

A significant artistic patron in the Jacobean as well as the Elizabethan era, Southampton promoted the work of George Chapman, Samuel Daniel, Thomas Heywood, and the composer Alfonso Ferrabosco the younger. Heywood's popular, expansionist dramas were compatible with Southampton's maritime and colonial interests.

== Virginia Company ==
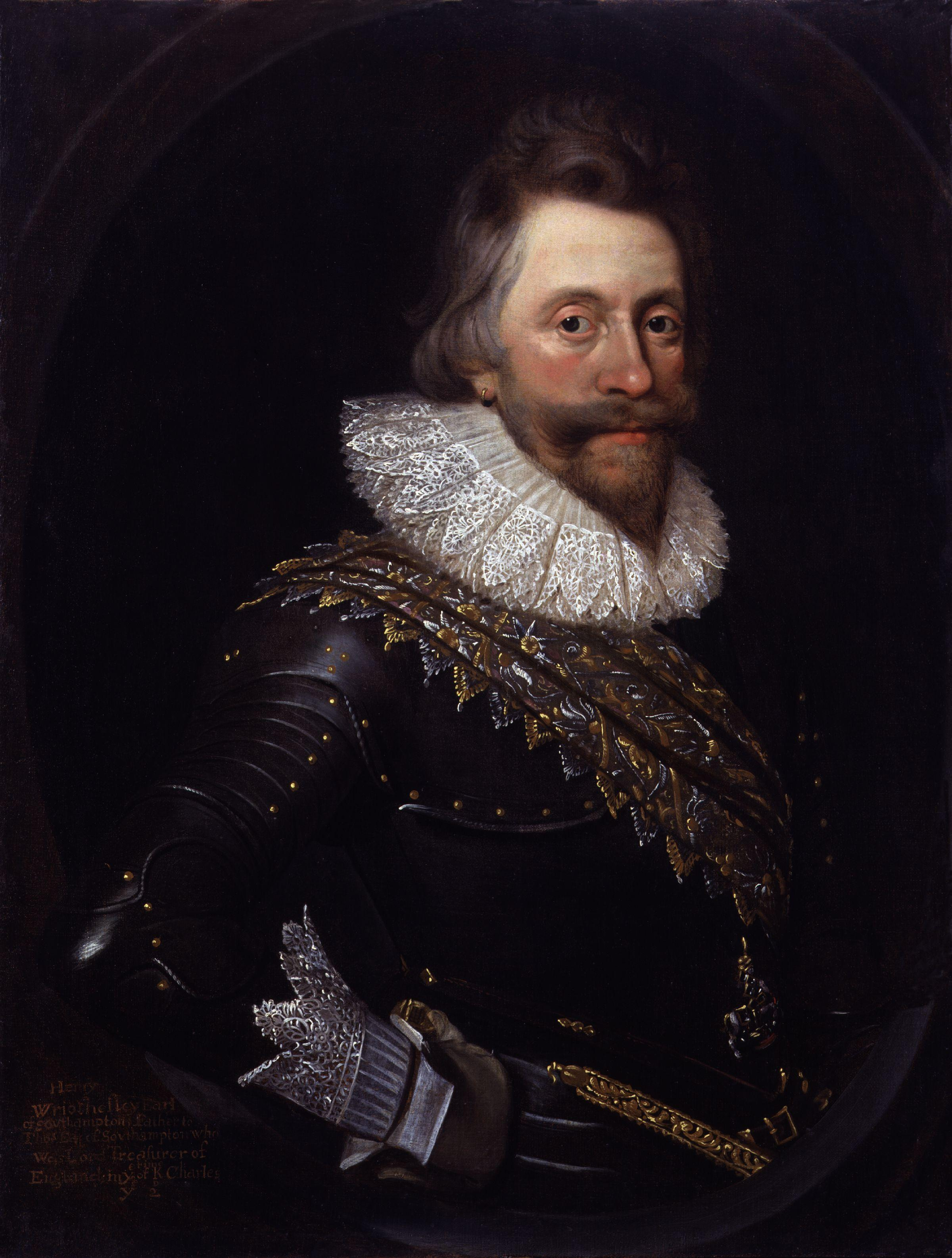
The Earl of Southampton c. 1618, at age 45, after a portrait by Daniel Mytens, National Portrait Gallery, London.

Henry Wriothesley, whose name is included in the 1605 panel of the New World Tapestry, took a considerable share in promoting the colonial enterprises of the time, and was an active member of the Virginia Company's governing council. Although profits proved elusive, his other visions for the Colony based at Jamestown were eventually accomplished. He was part of a faction within the company with Sir Edwin Sandys, who eventually became the Treasurer, and worked tirelessly to support the struggling venture. In addition to profits, Southampton's faction sought a permanent colony which would enlarge British territory, relieve the nation's overpopulation, and expand the market for English goods. Although profits largely eluded the Virginia Company, and it was dissolved in 1624, the other goals were accomplished.

His name is thought by many to be the origin of the naming of the harbour of Hampton Roads, and the Hampton River. Although named at later dates, similar attribution may involve the town (and later city) of Hampton, Virginia, as well as Southampton County, Virginia and Northampton County. However, the name Southampton was not uncommon in England, including an important port city and an entire region along the southern coast, which was originally part of Hampshire. There are also variations applied in other areas of the English colonies which were not part of the Virginia Company of London's efforts, making the origin of the word and derivations of it as applied in Virginia even more debatable.

== Later life and death ==
In 1624, Southampton was one of four Englishmen appointed to command troops fighting in the Low Countries against the Spanish. Shortly after their arrival, the earl's eldest son, James Wriothesley, succumbed to an unspecified "fever" at Roosendaal. Five days later, on 10 November 1624, Southampton died of the same cause at Bergen-op-Zoom, aged 51. Their remains were returned to England, and both men were buried in the family chapel of the parish church of Titchfield, Hampshire. The magnificent tomb features four prominent obelisks as well as kneeling relief figures of the youthful 3rd Earl and his sister. The Wriothesleys were still Catholic in the early 1590s when this tomb was built, as were the Montagus of Cowdray, whose closely related tomb featuring similarly positioned obelisks was dismantled and relocated from Midhurst to Easebourne in the 19th century (Anthony Browne, 1st Viscount Montagu, was the 3rd Earl's maternal grandfather). The four obelisks probably reference the four internationally celebrated Egyptian ones re-erected by Pope Sixtus V in Rome in the 1580s.

He was succeeded by his second but only surviving son, the fourth Earl, who would become a prominent statesman and served as Lord High Treasurer under Charles II. That earl's father in law was Francis Leigh, 1st Earl of Chichester whose family fortunes were secured by Sir Thomas Leigh, who married the heiresses of Sir Rowland Hill.

== Marriage and issue ==
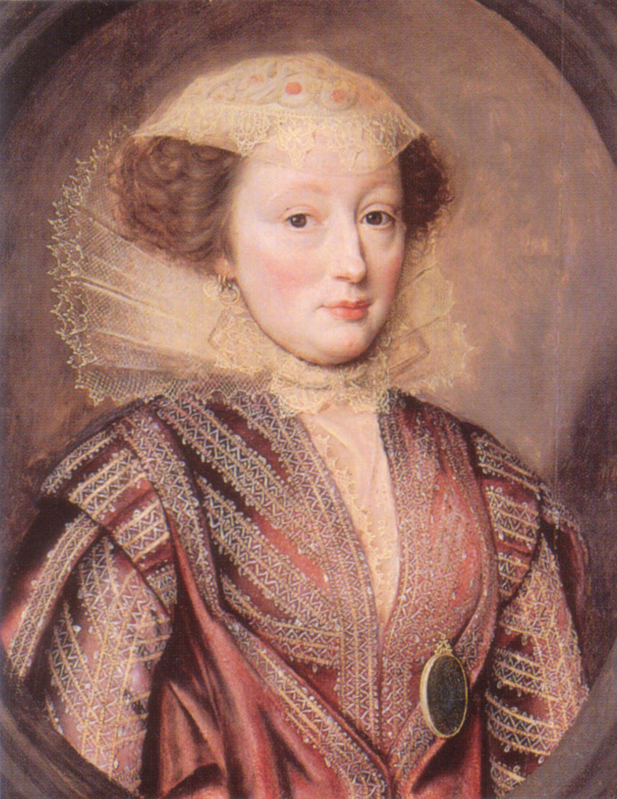
Elizabeth, Countess of Southampton c. 1618

In August 1598, Southampton married Elizabeth Vernon, the daughter of John Vernon of Hodnet, Shropshire, and his wife Elizabeth Devereux, who was the aunt of Robert Devereux, 2nd Earl of Essex – who is also connected with Elizabethan drama.

Devereux's grandfathers were the Viscount Hereford and the Earl of Huntingdon. On her father John Vernon's side, Elizabeth Vernon's paternal ancestors were more obscure. The marriage was held secretly to legitimise an already-visible pregnancy, based on a letter of John Chamberlain in which he writes "Mistress Vernon is from the court, and lies in Essex House. Some say she hath taken a venue under the girdle and swells upon it, yet she complains not of foul play but says the Earl of Southampton will justify it; and it is bruited underhand that he was lately here four days in great secret of purpose to marry her and effected it accordingly". Queen Elizabeth, angered by this marriage of one of her retinue without her permission, had both of the newlyweds imprisoned.

When Elizabeth was pregnant, she wrote to her husband asking him to buy her a stomacher of scarlet cloth lined with plush to keep her warm while riding. She also asked him to bring a portrait 'very finely done'.

They had two sons and three daughters listed on his funeral certificate:

- Lady Penelope Wriothesley (18 November 1598 – 16 July 1667), who married William Spencer, 2nd Baron Spencer of Wormleighton.
- Lady Anne Wriothesley (born 1600 – died 1662), who married Robert Wallop (20 July 1601 – 19 November 1667) of Farley Wallop, by whom she had issue; their great-grandson was John Wallop, 1st Earl of Portsmouth.
- James Wriothesley, Lord Wriothesley (1 March 1605 – 5 November 1624), who died of an unspecified "fever" five days before his father when they were fighting in the Low Countries; his father also died of fever.
- Thomas Wriothesley (10 March 1607 – 16 May 1667) who became the 4th Earl of Southampton and married firstly Rachel de Massue, daughter of Daniel de Massue, Seigneur de Ruvigny, by whom he had two daughters, Elizabeth, Viscountess Campden (died 1679) and Rachel, Lady Russell.

== Portraits ==
Numerous portraits of Southampton exist, in which he is depicted with dark auburn hair and blue eyes, compatible with Shakespeare's description of "a man right fair." Sir John Beaumont wrote a well-known elegy in his praise, and Gervase Markham wrote of him in a tract entitled Honor in his Perfection, or a Treatise in Commendation of ... Henry, Earl of Oxenford, Henry, Earle of Southampton, Robert, Earl of Essex (1624).

In 2002, a portrait in the Cobbe collection was identified as a portrait of the youthful Earl. Portraying him as an androgynous-looking young man, it is now known as the Cobbe portrait of Southampton.

In April 2008, another portrait believed to be of Southampton, was discovered hidden in a kind of pentimento beneath a portrait of his wife Elizabeth Vernon, when the work was X-rayed in preparation for an exhibition.

In 2025, a new portrait of the 3rd Earl of Southampton was discovered. A historian at the University of Warwick attributed a miniature on a playing card to Nicholas Hilliard. It is very small, measuring just two and a quarter inches in height. The portrait bears similarities to the aforementioned Cobbe portrait, especially the Earl's hand, which holds his long hair in place at heart level.

== In fiction ==
The Earl has been played on screen by several different actors:

- Peter Egan in the BBC mini-series Elizabeth R, 1971.
- Nicholas Clay in the TV series Life of Shakespeare, 1978.
- Eddie Redmayne in the Channel 4 mini-series Elizabeth I, 2005.
- Shaun Evans in the mini-series The Virgin Queen, 2006.
- Xavier Samuel in the feature film Anonymous, 2011.
- Ben Willbond in the feature film Bill, 2015
- Adam Harley in the sitcom Upstart Crow, 2016.
- Ian McKellen in the feature film All Is True, 2018.
- He's the inspiration for Wriothesley, a character in the chinese videogame Genshin Impact.
- He is a prominent character in Jodi Picoult's 2024 novel, By Any Other Name.

== See also ==
- Earl of Southampton Trust

== Bibliography ==
- Akrigg, G.P.V. (1968). Shakespeare and the Earl of Southampton. Cambridge, Massachusetts: Harvard University Press.
- Chaney, Edward, '"Thy Pyramids buylt up with newer might...": Shakespeare and the Cultural Memory of Ancient Egypt'; https://journals.ub.uni-heidelberg.de/index.php/aegyp/article/view/76145
- Cokayne, G.E. (1953). The Complete Peerage edited by Geoffrey H. White. Vol. XII (Part I). London: St. Catherine Press.
- Collier, John Payne (1844). The Works of William Shakespeare. Vol. I. London: Whittaker & Co.
- Drake, Nathan (1817). Shakespeare and his Times. Vol. II. London: T. Cadell.
- Duncan-Jones, Katherine (November 1993). "Much Ado With Red and White; The Earliest Readers of Shakespeare's Venus and Adonis (1593)". Review of English Studies. 44 (176). Oxford University Press: 479–501. doi:10.1093/res/xliv.176.479.
- Dyce, Alexander (1829). The Works of George Peele. Vol. II (2nd ed.). London: William Pickering. pp. 215–42.
- Elzinga, J.G. (2004). "Wriothesley, Henry, second earl of Southampton (bap. 1545, d. 1581)". Oxford Dictionary of National Biography (online ed.). Oxford University Press. doi:10.1093/ref:odnb/30072. (Subscription, Wikipedia Library access or UK public library membership required.) (subscription required)
- Honan, Park (2012). "Wriothesley, Henry, third earl of Southampton (1573–1624)". Oxford Dictionary of National Biography (online ed.). Oxford University Press. doi:10.1093/ref:odnb/30073. (Subscription, Wikipedia Library access or UK public library membership required.)
- Honan, Park (1998). Shakespeare: A Life. Oxford: Clarendon Press. ISBN 9780199774753.
- McClure, Norman Egbert, ed. (1939). The Letters of John Chamberlain. Vol. I. Philadelphia: American Philosophical Society.
- McKerrow, Ronald B., ed. (1958). The Works of Thomas Nashe. Vol. IV. Oxford: Basil Blackwell.
- Medina, David (2025). Shakespeare's Greatest Love. Washington, DC: Disruption Books. ISBN 9781633311060.
- Romilly, John, ed. (1879). Seventh Report of the Historical Manuscripts Commission, Part I. London: Her Majesty's Stationery Office.
- Montague-Smith, Patrick (1977). Debrett's Correct Form (1st ed.). London: Debrett's Peerage Ltd.
- Richardson, Douglas (2011). Everingham, Kimball G. (ed.). Magna Carta Ancestry: A Study in Colonial and Medieval Families. Vol. III (2nd ed.). Salt Lake City. ISBN 978-1449966393.
- Rowse, A.L. (1965). Shakespeare's Southampton: Patron of Virginia. London: Macmillan.
- Steggle, Matthew (2004). "Markham, Gervase (1568?–1637)". Oxford Dictionary of National Biography (online ed.). Oxford University Press. doi:10.1093/ref:odnb/18065. (Subscription, Wikipedia Library access or UK public library membership required.) (subscription required)
- Stopes, Charlotte Carmichael (1922). The Life of Henry, Third Earl of Southampton, Shakespeare's Patron. Cambridge: Cambridge University Press.
- Wells, J.C. (2008). Longman Pronunciation Dictionary (3rd ed.). Harlow: Pearson Education Limited.
- Brown, Charles Cedric, ed. Patronage, Politics, and Literary Traditions in England, 1558–1658. Detroit, Wayne State University Press, 1993.
- Collins, Arthur. Letters and Memorials of State in the Reigns of Queen Mary, Queen Elizabeth, King James, King Charles the I, Part of the Reign of King Charles II and Oliver's Usurpation Written and Collected by Hen. Sydney, Phil. Sydney and His Brother Rob. Sydney, Rob. IId. Earl of Leicerter, Phil. Viscount Lisle, and Alg. Sydney; Together with Letters of the Other Ministers of State, with Whom They Held a Correspondence. London: Printed for T. Osborne, 1746.
- Wriothesley family Accessed 29 December 2007
- Shakespeare, William, and Alexander Chalmers. The Works of William Shakspeare. Philadelphia: Lippincott, 1858. (p. clxxiii) googlebooks Accessed 29 December 2007
- The Rape of Lucrece online Retrieved 29 December 2007
- X-rays uncover 'hidden portrait' Tuesday, 29 April 2008 http://news.bbc.co.uk/1/hi/england/7372629.stm

Attribution:

Political offices
Preceded by The Earl of Devonshire	Lord Lieutenant of Hampshire jointly with The Earl of Devonshire 1604–1606; 1604–1624	Succeeded by The Lord Conway
Preceded by The Lord Hunsdon	Custos Rotulorum of Hampshire bef. 1605–1624	Succeeded by Sir Henry Wallop
Peerage of England
Preceded by Henry Wriothesley	Earl of Southampton; 1581–1624	Succeeded by Thomas Wriothesley
