= Daniel de Massue, Seigneur de Rouvigny =

French nobleman

Daniel de Massue, Seigneur de Rouvigny was a French nobleman born in 1577, and died in 1613. He was married to Madeleine de Pinot des Fontaines, by whom he had four children:

- Rachel de Massue, mother of Rachel Wriothesley
- Henri de Massue, 1st Marquis de Rouvigny
- Maximilien de Massue
- Sarah de Massue

The Seigneur was the son of Nicholas De Massue, a French gentleman, and brought rank and fame to his family.
