= Rachel Russell, Lady Russell =

Historical English noblewoman

Rachel, Lady Russell
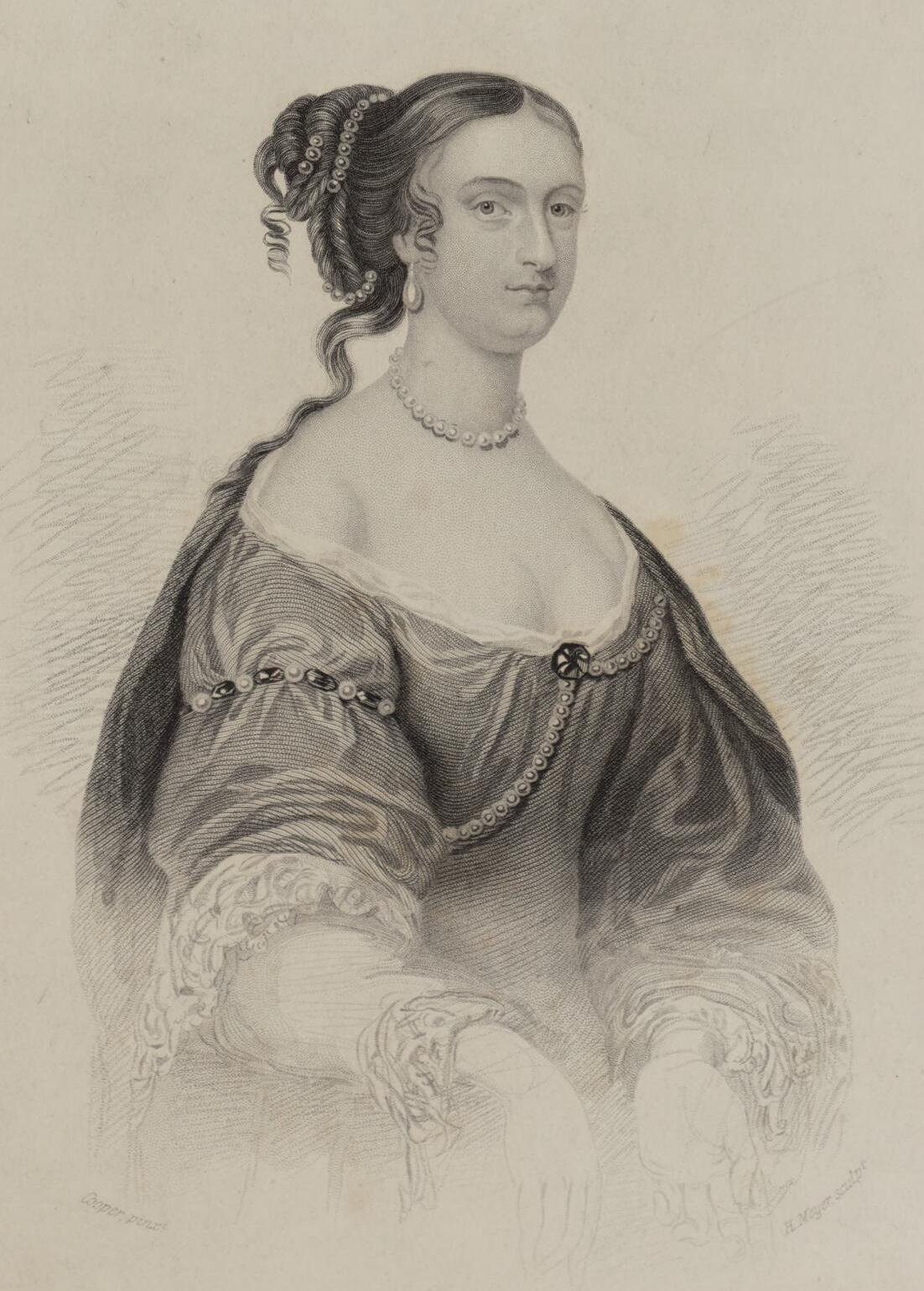
- Stipple engraving of Lady Russell
- Born: Lady Rachel Wriothesley c. 1636; Titchfield
- Died: 29 September 1723 (aged 86–87); Southampton House, Bloomsbury, London
- Noble family: Wriothesley
- Spouses: Francis, Lord Vaughan; William, Lord Russell
- Issue: Anne Russell; Rachel Cavendish, Duchess of Devonshire; Catherine Russell; Wriothesley Russell, 2nd Duke of Bedford
- Father: Thomas Wriothesley, 4th Earl of Southampton
- Mother: Rachel de Massue

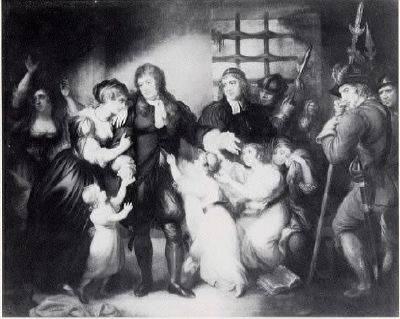
A 19th-century painting depicting Rachel and her children visiting her husband Lord Russell in the Tower of London sometime before his execution.

Rachel, Lady Russell (née Wriothesley /ˈraɪəθsli/ RYE-əths-lee; c. 1636 – 29 September 1723) was an English noblewoman, heiress, and writer. Her second husband was William, Lord Russell, who was implicated in the Rye House Plot and later executed. A collection of the many letters she wrote to her husband and other distinguished men was published in 1773.

== Family and early years ==
Lady Rachel was born in about 1636 at Titchfield, Hampshire, the second eldest daughter and co-heiress of Thomas Wriothesley, 4th Earl of Southampton, by his first wife, Rachel de Massue, daughter of Daniel de Massue, Seigneur de Rouvigny and Madeleine de Pinot des Fontaines. Lady Rachel received a religious upbringing, and remained throughout her life, a devout member of the Church of England.

In her youth, she was described as having been remarkable for her elegance of form, personal beauty, and graceful manners.

== Marriages and issue ==
In 1653, Lady Rachel married her first husband, Francis Vaughan, Lord Vaughan, the eldest son of Richard Vaughan, 2nd Earl of Carbery. Upon their marriage, she went to live with her father-in-law at Golden Grove in Carmarthen, Wales. In 1655, she gave birth to a child, whose sex and name was not recorded as it died shortly after its birth. She became a widow in 1667, which was the same year her father died. She, her older sister, Elizabeth, Viscountess Campden, and their younger half-sister, who was also named Elizabeth (she became Countess of Northumberland), inherited his entire estate. Lady Campden received the family seat of Titchfield, while the share which Lady Vaughan inherited was the domain of Stratton, also in Hampshire. Rachel remained with the Viscountess Campden at Titchfield for some time after their father's death.

In 1669, Lady Vaughan married her second husband, William, Lord Russell, who was three years her junior. They obtained a marriage licence at Titchfield on 31 July 1669, and were married on 20 August 1669. The marriage was described as having been happy, and Lord Russell appreciated his wife's intelligence, virtue, affection and piety. In 1678, upon the death of her childless brother-in-law, Francis, the couple became known as Lord and Lady Russell. Together they had four children:

- Anne Russell (13 December 1671—April 1672)
- Rachel Russell (January 1674 – 28 December 1725), married William Cavendish, 2nd Duke of Devonshire, by whom she had ten children.
- Catherine Russell (23 August 1676 – 30 October 1711), married John Manners, 2nd Duke of Rutland, by whom she had nine children.
- Wriothesley Russell, 2nd Duke of Bedford (1 November 1680 – 26 May 1711), married Elizabeth Howland, by whom he had six children.

== Rye House Plot ==
In 1683, Lord Russell was one of the conspirators in the Rye House Plot, a plan to ambush King Charles II and his brother, James, Duke of York, to prevent a Catholic succession. The two were on their way back to London from the Newmarket races, but their schedule was altered. The plot was disclosed to the government, and Lord Russell, unlike his co-conspirators, refused to escape to Holland. He was accused of promising his assistance in an insurrection and bringing about the death of the King and the Duke of York. On 26 June 1683, he was sent to the Tower of London and shortly afterwards, tried and convicted of treason, although all the evidence presented against him was all hearsay. Lady Russell had acted as his secretary during his trial where he was sentenced to death by beheading. Upon his condemnation, Lady Russell laboured diligently to save her husband's life; she was aided by her father-in-law, the Earl of Bedford, who offered a sum of between £50,000 and £100,000 for a pardon to his son. Lady Russell even threw herself at the King's feet, pleading for him to grant clemency to her husband; however, the King was unmoved by her tearful pleas, and refused to abrogate the death sentence.

On the day before her husband's execution, Lady Russell visited him in the Tower and they embraced one last time. The following morning, on 21 July 1683, he was beheaded at Lincoln's Inn Fields. Several days later, she wrote the King a letter.

The attainder against her husband was reversed by a bill which was passed in Parliament and received the royal signature in the reign of William III and Mary II.

== Legacy ==
Throughout her long life, Lady Russell was an avid letter-writer as well as an author. Her numerous letters, which were later published in 1773, were written mainly to her husband but also to many distinguished men such as John Tillotson, Archbishop of Canterbury. They were of good quality and exceptionally well written, and her correspondence provides a personal insight into 17th-century English domestic life. In addition to her letters, Rachel also wrote diaries, essays, a catechism, and Instructions for Children. The full title of the 1826 edition of the "Letters" is Letters of Lady Rachel Russell: from the manuscript in the library at Woburn Abbey ... and the trial of lord William Russell for high treason. The edition of 1853 (2 vols.) was edited by Earl Russell, annotated by John Martin, the librarian to the Duke of Bedford, and published by Longman, Brown, Green and Longmans, London.

Seven engraved portraits of Rachel Wriothesley are displayed in the National Portrait Gallery in London.

Lady Russell died at Southampton House, Bloomsbury, London on 29 September 1723, the anniversary of her husband's birth; she was about 87 years old. Lady Russell was buried beside her husband on 8 October 1723 in the Bedford Chapel at the Parish Church of Chenies, Buckinghamshire.

== See also ==
- Rye House Plot

== Ancestry ==
Ancestors of Rachel Russell, Lady Russell

Thomas Wriothesley, 1st Earl of Southampton
Henry Wriothesley, 2nd Earl of Southampton
Jane Cheney
Henry Wriothesley, 3rd Earl of Southampton
Anthony Browne, 1st Viscount Montagu
Mary Browne
Lady Jane Radcliffe
Thomas Wriothesley, 4th Earl of Southampton
George Vernon, of Hodnet
Sir John Vernon, of Hodnet
Elizabeth Pigot
Elizabeth Vernon
Sir Richard Devereux
Elizabeth Devereux
Dorothy Hastings
Rachel Wriothesley
Thierry de Massue
Nicolas de Massue, Seigneur de Saint-Aubin
Péronne de Berengueville
Daniel de Massue, Seigneur de Rouvigny
Antoine d'Ailly
Hélène d'Ailly de Pierrepont
Charlotte de Famechon
Rachel de Massue
Jean de Pinot des Fontaines
Madeleine de Pinot des Fontaines
