= James Wriothesley, Lord Wriothesley =

English politician (1605–1624)

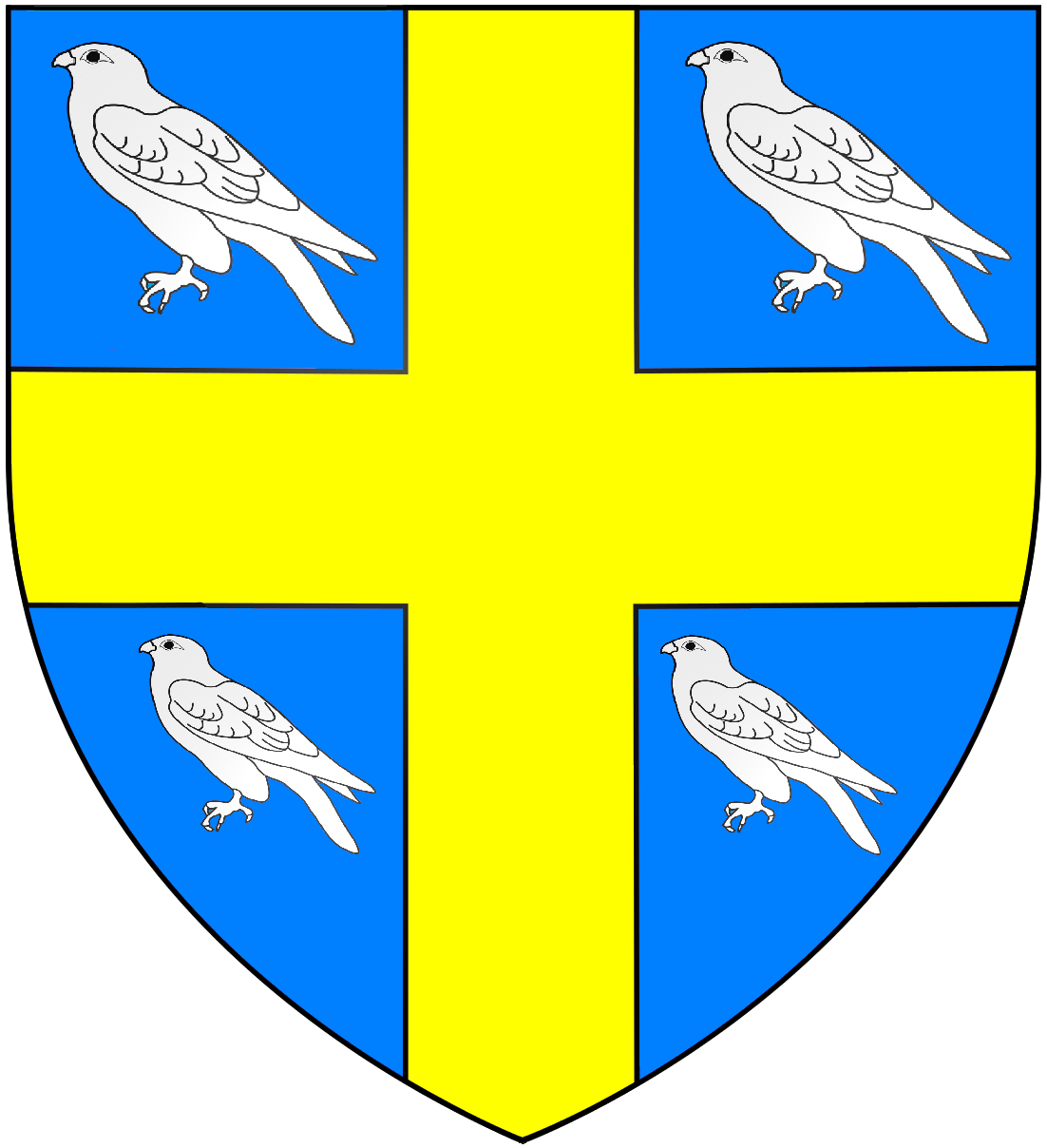
Arms of Wriothesley: Azure, a cross or between four hawks close argent

James Wriothesley, Lord Wriothesley KB (1 March 1605 – 5 November 1624) was an English politician who sat in the House of Commons between 1621 and 1624.

== Life ==
Wriothesley was the eldest son of Henry Wriothesley, 3rd Earl of Southampton and his wife Elizabeth Vernon and was baptised on 26 March 1605 in the Chapel Royal, Greenwich.

He was educated at Eton College between 1613 and 1619, and entered St John's College, Cambridge, although he took no degree.

His sovereign throughout his lifetime, the namesake James I of England, was his godfather, and at the age of eleven Wriothesley was made a Knight of the Bath (KB) at the investiture of James' son, the future King Charles I, as Prince of Wales on 4 November 1616.

In 1621, though a minor, he was elected Member of Parliament for Callington, serving until 1622. He was elected MP for Winchester in 1624, in what became known as the Happy Parliament. His death at the age of 19 years 251 days makes him a contender for the record of shortest-lived MP in the Parliament of England.

During the Eighty Years War, following his last election, Wriothesley went as Captain in an English regiment commanded by his father in the service of the Elector Palatine, King James' son-in-law. He died of fever at Roosendaal, Netherlands, only five days before his father - and was buried with him at Titchfield on 28 December 1624.

Parliament of England
Preceded by Henry Rolle; Humphrey Weare	Member of Parliament for Callington; 1621–1622; With: Henry Rolle	Succeeded by Henry Rolle; Sir Edward Seymour
Preceded by Richard Tichborne; Sir Thomas Philips	Member of Parliament for Winchester; 1624; With: Richard Tichborne	Succeeded by Richard Tichborne; Robert Mason
