= Edward Noel, 1st Earl of Gainsborough =

British peer

The Right Honourable Edward Noel
- The Earl of Gainsborough
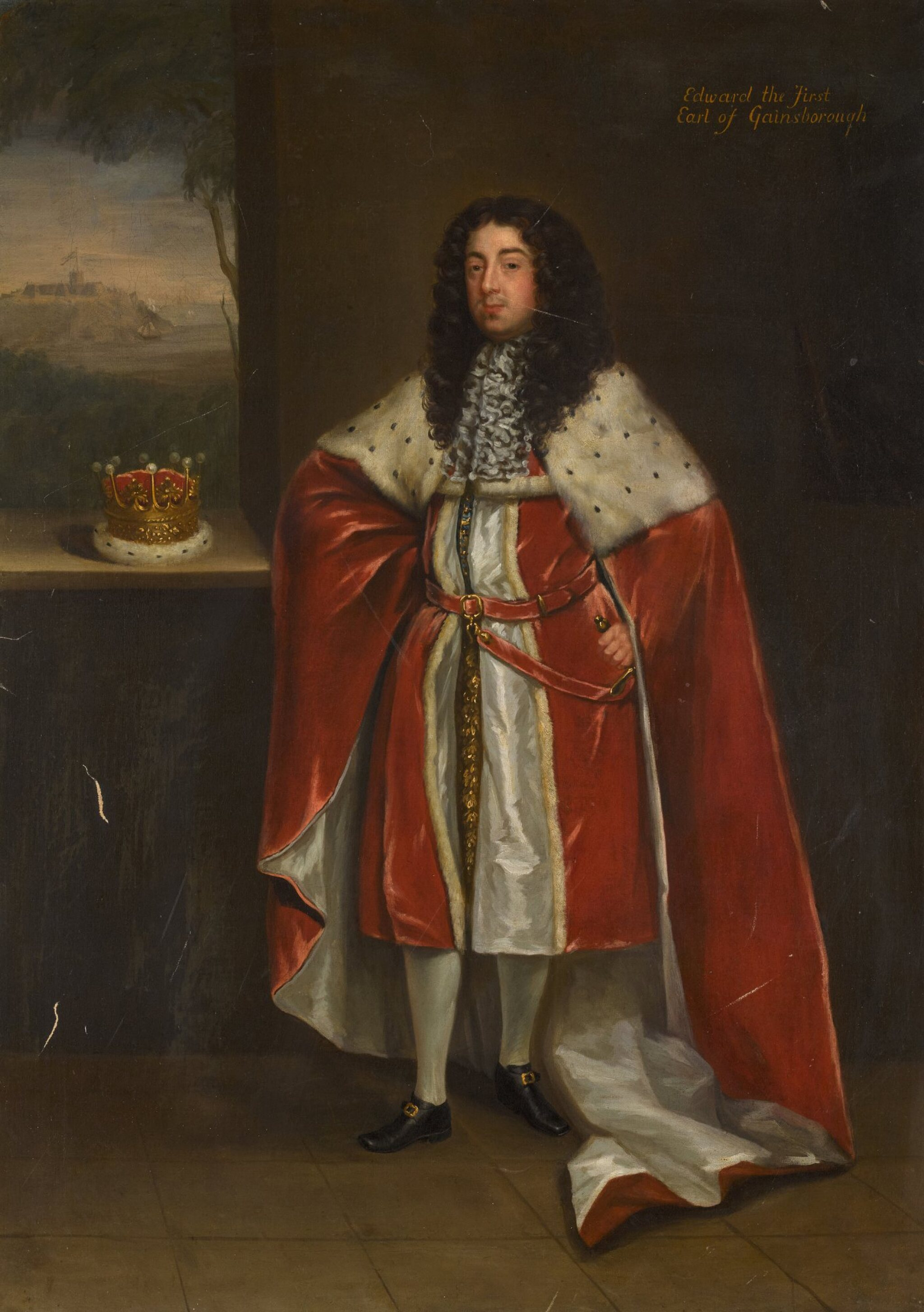
- Posthumous portrait of Edward Noel, 1st Earl of Gainsborough (by J. Henesy, 1737)

- Coat of arms
- Tenure: 1682–1689 (Earl of Gainsborough and Viscount Campden); 1681–1689 (Baron Noel)
- Predecessor: Baptist Noel, 3rd Viscount Campden; New creation (Earl of Gainsborough and Baron Noel)
- Successor: Wriothesley Noel, 2nd Earl of Gainsborough
- Other titles: Viscount Campden; Baron Noel
- Born: 1641
- Died: January 1689 (aged 47–48)
- Spouses: Lady Elizabeth Wriothesley (m. 1661) Mary Herbert (before 1689)
- Issue: Wriothesley Noel, 2nd Earl of Gainsborough; Lady Frances Noel; Lady Jane Noel; Lady Elizabeth Noel; Lady Juliana Noel
- Father: Baptist Noel, 3rd Viscount Campden
- Mother: Hon. Hester Wotton

Edward Noel, 1st Earl of Gainsborough, 4th Viscount Campden (1641 – January 1689) was an English peer, styled Hon. Edward Noel from 1660 to 1681.

== Origins ==
Edward Noel was born in 1641, the son and heir of Baptist Noel, 3rd Viscount Campden.

== Career ==
Noel represented Rutland in the House of Commons of England from 1661 to 1679. He was appointed a deputy lieutenant of Rutland in March 1670. In 1676, he was appointed Lord Lieutenant of Hampshire in February, and Warden and Keeper of the New Forest in March.

After being appointed Colonel of the Hampshire Militia in 1678, he was briefly knight of the shire for Hampshire in 1679. On 3 February 1681, he was created Baron Noel and entered the House of Lords, and was appointed Custos Rotulorum of Hampshire. In 1682, he was given several local offices in Hampshire: Governor of Portsmouth, Constable of Porchester Castle, and Lieutenant of South Bere Forest. He succeeded his father in October as Viscount Campden and as Lord Lieutenant and Custos Rotulorum of Rutland, and was further honoured at the end of the year when he was created Earl of Gainsborough on 1 December 1682.

Between December 1687 and January 1688, during the purge of James II, he was dismissed from all his Hampshire offices in favour of the Duke of Berwick, although he was commissioned a captain in the Queen Dowager's Regiment of Foot in 1687. He was also replaced by Earl of Peterborough as Lord Lieutenant of Rutland at this time.

On 25 March 1688, he was reappointed Warden and Keeper of the New Forest and the Park of Lyndhurst.

== Marriages and issue ==
He married twice:

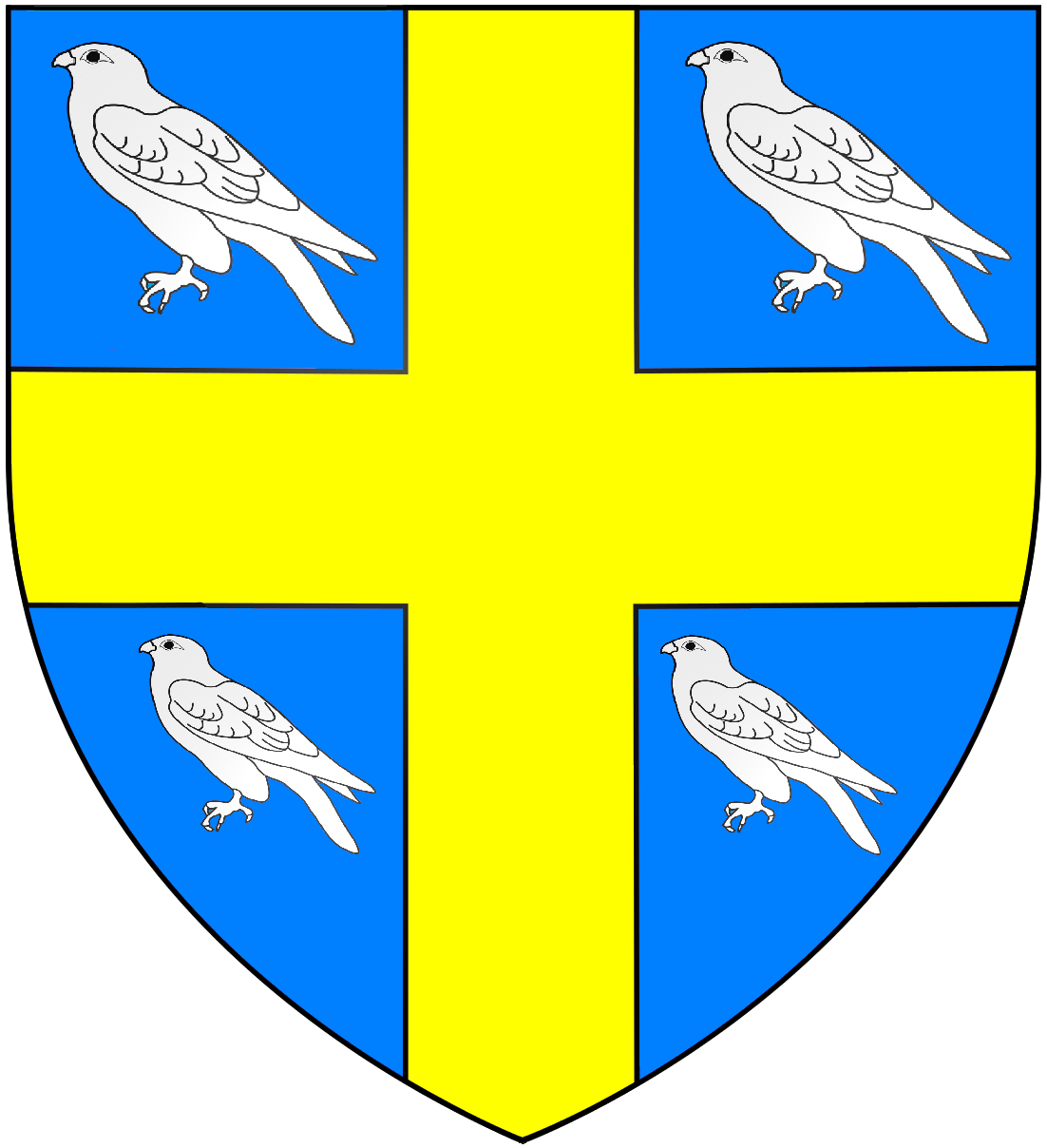
Arms of Wriothesley: Azure, a cross or between four hawks close argent

- Firstly to Lady Elizabeth Wriothesley, the eldest of the three daughters and co-heiresses of Thomas Wriothesley, 4th Earl of Southampton (by his first wife), by whom he had five children:
  - Wriothesley Baptist Noel, 2nd Earl of Gainsborough (d. 1690), son and heir;
  - Lady Frances Noel (d. 1684), who married Simon Digby, 4th Baron Digby
  - Lady Jane Noel, who married William Digby, 5th Baron Digby
  - Lady Elizabeth Noel, who married Richard Norton (d.1732);
  - Lady Juliana Noel, who died unmarried
- Secondly he married Mary Herbert, widow of Sir Robert Worsley, 3rd Baronet and daughter of James Herbert. Without issue.

== Death and succession ==
He died in January 1689 and was succeeded by his son Wriothesley Baptist Noel, 2nd Earl of Gainsborough.

Parliament of England
Preceded by Philip Sherard; Samuel Browne	Member of Parliament for Rutland; 1661–1679; With: Philip Sherard	Succeeded by Philip Sherard; Sir Thomas Mackworth
Preceded by Sir John Norton; Sir Francis Rolle	Member of Parliament for Hampshire; 1679; With: Richard Norton	Succeeded by Lord Russell; Sir Francis Rolle
Honorary titles
Preceded by The Marquess of Winchester	Lord Lieutenant of Hampshire; 1676–1687; Served alongside: Viscount Campden 1684–1687	Succeeded by James FitzJames
Preceded by Lord Annesley	Custos Rotulorum of Hampshire; 1681–1688	Succeeded by James FitzJames
Preceded by George Legge	Governor of Portsmouth; 1682–1687	Succeeded by James FitzJames
Preceded by The Viscount Campden	Lord Lieutenant of Rutland; 1682–1688; Served alongside: Viscount Campden 1685–1688	Succeeded by The Earl of Peterborough
Preceded by The Viscount Campden	Custos Rotulorum of Rutland; 1682–1689	Succeeded by The Lord Sherard
Peerage of England
New creation	Earl of Gainsborough; 1682–1689	Succeeded by Wriothesley Noel
Preceded by Baptist Noel	Viscount Campden; 1682–1689	Succeeded by Wriothesley Noel
New creation	Baron Noel; 1681–1689	Succeeded by Wriothesley Noel
