= Saurin =

Saurin is a surname, and may refer to:

- Bernard-Joseph Saurin (1706–1781), French writer
- Jacques Saurin (1677–1730), French Huguenot minister
- James Saurin (c.1760–1842), Irish Anglican bishop
- James Saurin (priest) (1798–1879), Irish Anglican priest, son of the bishop
- Joseph Saurin (1659–1737), French mathematician
- Lewis Saurin (died 1749), Anglican priest
- Margaret Saurin (born 1978), Irish association footballer and coach
- Paul Saurin (1903–1983), French politician
- Susan Saurin (1829–1915), British Catholic nun
- Vincent Saurin (1907–1991), French rower
- William Saurin (1757–1839), Irish barrister and politician

== See also ==
- Saurin, Ontario, community in the township of Springwater, Ontario
- Saurin (Star Wars), fictional race in the Star Wars universe
