= John T. Dillon =

John T. Dillon is the name of:

- John T. Dillon (actor) (1876–1937), American film actor
- John T. Dillon (businessman) (1938–2023), American business executive
- John Talbot Dillon (1739–1805), Irish politician and baronet, traveller and historical writer
- John Talbot Dillon (author) (1734–1806), Anglo-Irish naval officer, traveller and historian

== See also ==
- John Dillon (disambiguation)
