= John Dillon (disambiguation) =

John Dillon (1851–1927) was an Irish nationalist politician.

John Dillon may also refer to:

- John Dillon (Australian politician) (1847–1888), New South Wales politician and barrister
- John Dillon (baseball), 19th-century baseball player
- John Dillon (comedian) (1831–1913), American comedian based in Chicago
- John Dillon (footballer, born 1942) (1942–2019), Scottish footballer for Sunderland
- John Dillon (footballer, born 1978), Scottish footballer
- John Dillon (hurler) (1943–2019), Irish hurler
- John Dillon (Newfoundland politician), Newfoundland politician
- John Dillon (sailor) (1921–1988), British sailor
- John Dillon, one-half of the Dillon Brothers vaudeville group in late 1800s
- John Dillon, original member of southern rock band the Ozark Mountain Daredevils
- John Dillon (1932/33–2025), British actor
- Hook Dillon (John Dillon, 1924–2004), American basketball player for the University of North Carolina
- John A. Dillon (1923–2005), American physicist, administrator and professor at the University of Louisville
- John Blake Dillon (1814–1866), Irish writer and politician
- John Forrest Dillon (1831–1914), American jurist from Iowa
- John Francis Dillon (commissioner) (1866–1927), one of the first members of the Federal Radio Commission in the United States
- John Francis Dillon (director) (1884–1934), American film director and actor
- John J. Dillon (baseball) American baseball player
- John J. Dillon (politician) (1926–1983), American politician from Indiana
- John J. Dillon (publisher) (1856–1950), editor and publisher; commissioner of the New York State Department of Foods and Markets
- John M. Dillon (born 1939), Irish philosopher and neo-Platonic scholar
- John Robert Dillon (died 1948), architect active in Atlanta, Georgia
- John T. Dillon (actor) (1876–1937), American film actor
- John T. Dillon (businessman) (1938–2023), American business executive
- John Talbot Dillon (1739–1805), Irish politician and baronet, traveller and historical writer
- John Talbot Dillon (author) (1734–1806), Anglo-Irish naval officer, traveller and historian
- John Webb Dillon (1877–1949), British film actor

== See also ==
- Jack Dillon, ring name of American boxer Ernest Cutler Price (1891–1942)
