= Johnston baronets =

Extinct baronetcy in the Baronetage of the United Kingdom

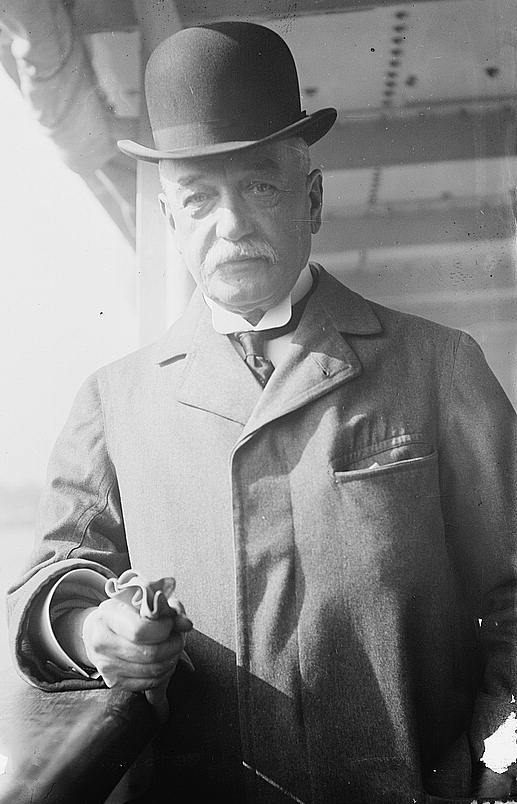
Sir Charles Johnston, 1st Baronet

There have been four Baronetcies created for persons with the surname Johnston (as distinct from Johnstone), two in the Baronetage of Nova Scotia, one in the Baronetage of Ireland and one in the Baronetage of the United Kingdom. One creation is extant as of 2010.

The Johnston Baronetcy, of Caskiebien in the County of Aberdeen, was created in the Baronetage of Nova Scotia on 31 March 1626 for George Johnston.

The Johnston Baronetcy, of Elphinstone in the County of Haddington, was created in the Baronetage of Nova Scotia on 18 October 1628 for Samuel Johnston. Nothing further is known of the title after the death of the third Baronet in circa 1700.

The Johnston Baronetcy, of Gilford in the County of Down, was created in the Baronetage of Ireland on 27 July 1772 for Richard Johnston, later a member of the Irish House of Commons for Kilbeggan and Blessington. The title became extinct on the death of his son, the second Baronet, in 1841.

The Johnston Baronetcy, of London, was created in the Baronetage of the United Kingdom on 22 January 1916 for Charles Johnston, Lord Mayor of London between 1914 and 1915. The title became extinct on his death in 1933.

== Johnston baronets, of Caskieben (1626) ==
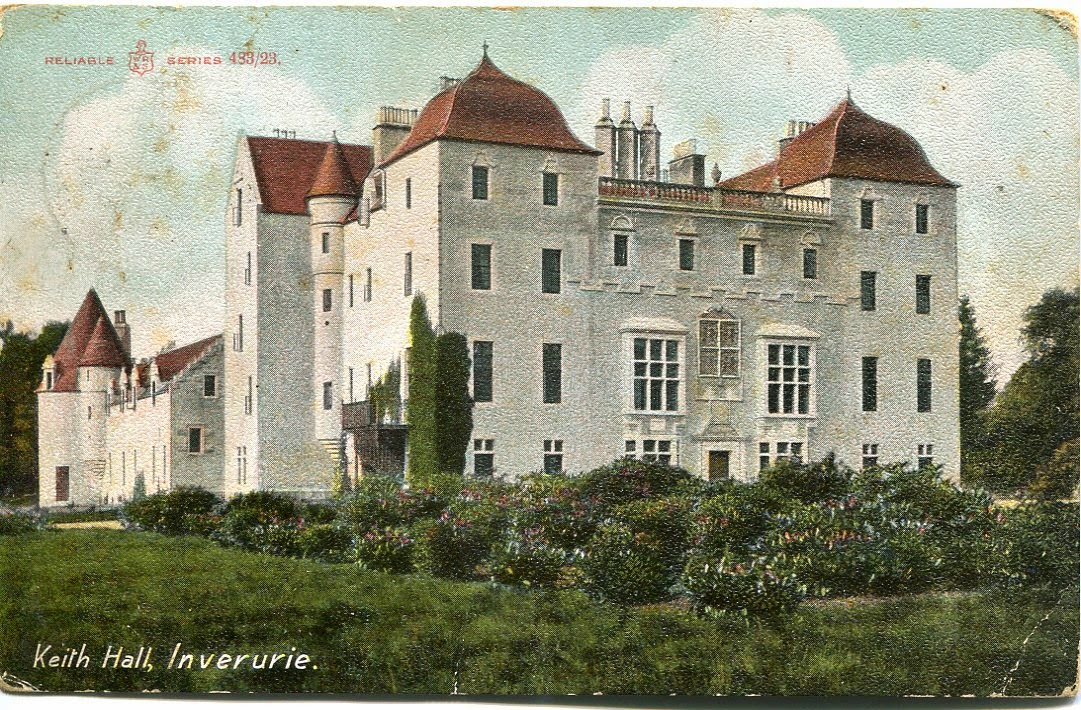
Caskieben House aka Keith Hall

- Sir George Johnston, 1st Baronet (died c. 1650)
- Sir George Johnston, 2nd Baronet (died c. 1680)
- Sir John Johnston, 3rd Baronet (c. 1648–1690)
- Sir John Johnston, 4th Baronet (died 1724)
- Sir William Johnston, 5th Baronet (c. 1675–1750)
- Sir William Johnston, 6th Baronet (1714–1794)
- Sir William Johnston, 7th Baronet (1760–1844)
- Sir William Bacon Johnston, 8th Baronet (1806–1865)
- Sir William Johnston, 9th Baronet (1849–1917)
- Sir George Johnston, 10th Baronet (1849–1921)
- Sir Thomas Alexander Johnston, 11th Baronet (1857–1950)
- Sir Thomas Alexander Johnston, 12th Baronet (1888–1959)
- Sir Thomas Alexander Johnston, 13th Baronet (1916–1984)
- Sir Thomas Alexander Johnston, 14th Baronet (born 1956)

The heir presumptive to the title is the present baronet's second cousin once removed, William Norville Johnston (born 1955)

== Johnston baronets, of Elphinston (1628) ==
- Sir Samuel Johnston, 1st Baronet (c. 1600-c. 1644)
- Sir John Johnston, 2nd Baronet (died c. 1666)
- Sir James Johnston, 3rd Baronet (died c. 1700)

== Johnston baronets, of Gilford (1772) ==
- Sir Richard Johnston, 1st Baronet (1743–1795)
- Sir William Johnston, 2nd Baronet (1765–1841)

== Johnston baronets, of London (1916) ==
- Sir Charles Johnston, 1st Baronet (1848–1933)

== See also ==
- Johnson baronets
- Johnstone baronets
