= Sir Richard Johnston, 1st Baronet =

Anglo-Irish politician (1743–1795)

Sir Richard Johnston, 1st Baronet (1 August 1743 – 22 April 1795) was an Anglo-Irish politician in the Irish House of Commons.

Johnston was High Sheriff of Down in 1765, High Sheriff of Armagh in 1771 and was made a baronet, of Gilford in the Baronetage of Ireland on 27 July 1772. Between 1776 and 1783 he was the Member of Parliament for Kilbeggan, before representing Blessington from 1783 until his death in 1795. He was succeeded in his title by his son, William.

In March 1772, Johnston was the target of violent protests by the Hearts of Steel, who attacked his castle at Gilford, County Down. This resulted in a gun battle during which Johnston was forced to flee the castle by swimming across the River Bann.

Parliament of Ireland
Preceded by Gustavus Lambart; Charles Lambart	Member of Parliament for Kilbeggan; 1776–1783; With: Charles Lambart	Succeeded by Henry Flood; John Philpot Curran
Preceded by John Talbot Dillon; John Reilly	Member of Parliament for Blessington; 1783–1795; With: John Reilly	Succeeded by David Ker; John Reilly
Baronetage of Ireland
New title	Baronet (of Gilford); 1772–1795	Succeeded by William Johnston
