= Ralph Lambert =

Irish Anglican priest

Ralph Lambert (1667–1731) was an Irish Anglican priest in the first half of the 18th century.

He was the son of George Lambert, and was born in County Louth. Lambert was a contemporary of Jonathan Swift at Trinity College, Dublin.

Lambert became Swift's rival, and took the post of chaplain to Thomas Wharton, 1st Earl of Wharton, when Wharton became Lord Lieutenant of Ireland, in 1709. He was Dean of Down from 1709 until 1717; Bishop of Dromore from 1717 until 1727; and Bishop of Meath from 1726 until 1731. He was one of a group of Low Church, reforming clergy around William King, that included also Theophilus Bolton, John Stearne, and Edward Synge.

== Works ==
- A Sermon, Preach'd Nov. the 12th. 1702: Being the Day, Appointed for a Publick Thanksgiving to Almighty God: ... in the Parish-church of St. Giles's in the Fields, 1703
- An answer to a late pamphlet entitled, A Vindication of marriage as solemnized by Presbyterians in the North of Ireland, Dublin 1704; against John McBride, anonymous.
- A serious and humble Address to the Archbishops and Bishops of Ireland, wherein the Causes of that Contempt and Scorn the Clergy and Religion groan under are enquired into, London 1705. Anonymous.
- A friendly admonition to the Roman Catholicks of Ireland, sermons, 1705
- A Sermon preached to the Protestants of Ireland now residing in London, at their anniversary meeting, at St. James, Westminster, Oct. 23, 1708, a sermon on Isaiah 59 (1708), anti-Catholic and influenced by Sir John Temple and Henry Jones
- A Letter, printed in a Tract, called "Partiality Detected", Dublin 1709.

== Family ==
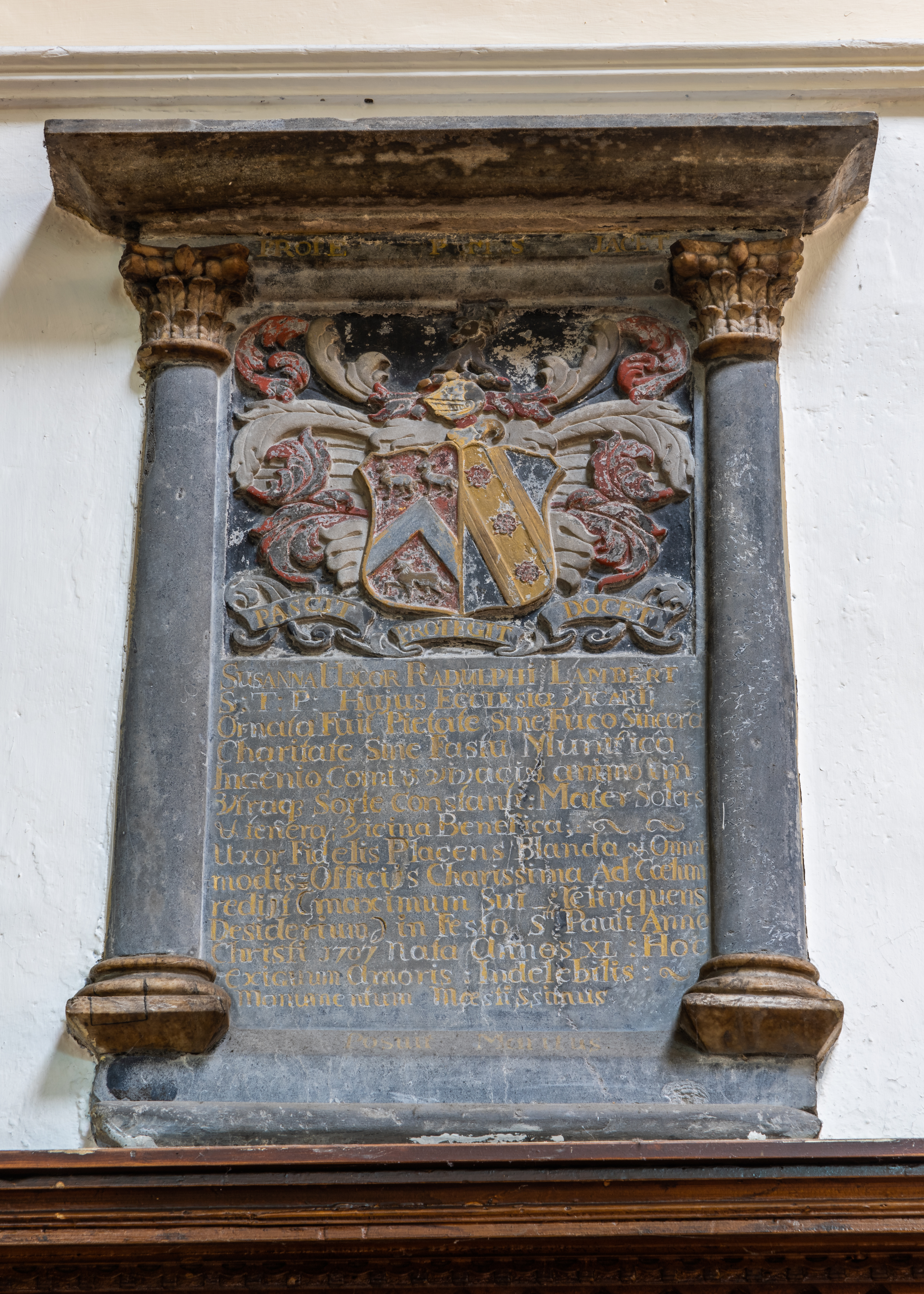
Aedicule in memory to his wife Susanna who died in 1707, located in St. Nicholas's' Church, Dundalk

Lambert married twice. His first wife Susanna died in 1707; she was the daughter of Smythe Kelly. In 1716 he married Elizabeth Rowley of Clonmethan. His daughter Elizabeth married Arthur Dillon and was mother of Sir John Talbot Dillon, 1st Baronet. Another daughter married William Smyth, Dean of Ardfert, eldest son of Thomas Smyth.
