= James Saurin =

Irish Anglican bishop (c.1760–1842)

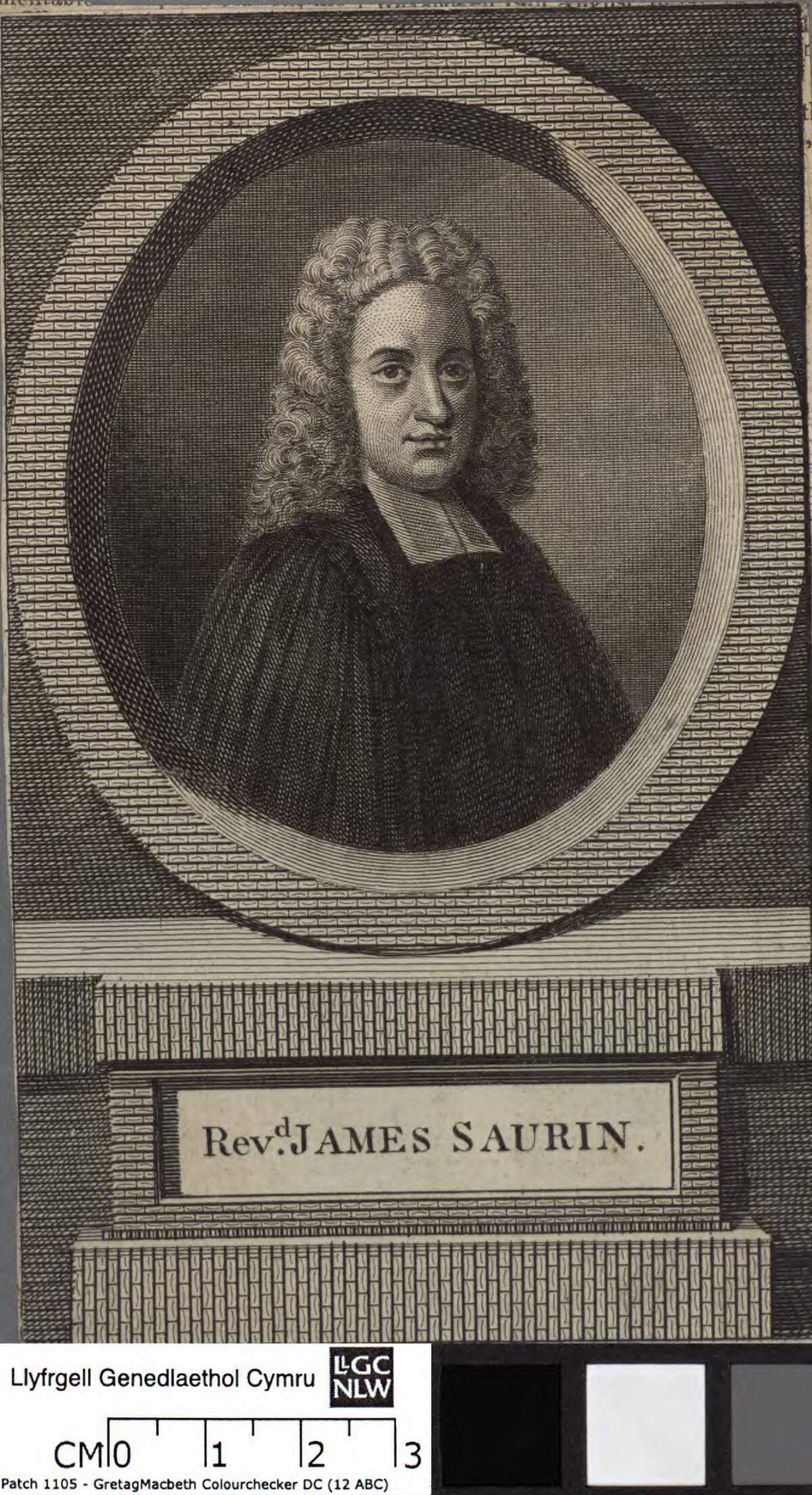
A portrait of James Saurin from the Welsh Portrait Collection at the National Library of Wales.

James Saurin (c.1760–1842) was an Irish Anglican bishop in the 19th century. He was the last Bishop of Dromore before it was merged to the Diocese of Down and Dromore.

He was born in Belfast, the third of the four sons of James Saurin, vicar of Belfast (died 1774) and Jane Duff. William Saurin, Attorney General for Ireland, was his elder brother. The Saurins were of Huguenot extraction, originally from Nimes in France. It was probably the Bishop's grandfather, Louis, who settled in Ireland about 1727 and became Dean of Ardagh; Louis was a brother of the celebrated preacher Jacques Saurin.

Like his brothers, James was educated at Dubourdien's School, a well-regarded private academy in Lisburn.

In 1774 he began his studies in Trinity College Dublin, earning a B.A. in 1779, awarded an M.A. 1782, and later he gained a B.D. and D.D. in 1820.

He married Elizabeth Lyster and had a numerous family, including James, Archdeacon of Dromore from 1832 to 1879; and Colonel William Saurin. William Saurin Lyster, the celebrated Australian actor, was a nephew.

He was appointed to St Doulagh's Church, Dublin in 1788, and in 1801, made vicar of Rosenallis in Kildare.

A former Dean of Derry (1812 to 1813), Archdeacon of Dublin (1813 to 1818) and Dean of Cork (1818 to 1819) he was the Bishop of Dromore from 1819 to 1842. He lived mainly at Dun Laoghaire where he died in office on 9 April 1842. He was buried in St. Ann's Church, Dawson Street.

A plaque in Dromore Cathedral praises his 22 years of "mild and paternal authority, fulfilling his duties with affection and constancy". While his brother William was a passionate supporter of the Orange Order and noted for his violent prejudice against Roman Catholics, this tribute suggests that James was more moderate in his religious views.

Coat of arms of James Saurin
| Crest On a wreath of the colours on a mount Vert an oak tree Proper. Escutcheon Argent on a mount Vert an oak tree Proper on a chief Azure a crescent between two mullets Argent. Motto Mur Et Vert |

Church of Ireland titles
| Preceded by John Powell Leslie | Bishop of Dromore; 1819–1842 | See merged to Down and Dromore |
