= Sir John Johnston, 3rd Baronet =

Scottish army officer and kidnapper

Sir John Johnston Bt
- Predecessor: George Johnston
- Successor: John Johnston
- Born: John Johnston; 1640s
- Died: 23 December, 1690

Sir John Johnston, 3rd Baronet of Caskieben (c. 1648 – 23 December 1690) was a Scottish soldier who was executed for his part in the abduction of Mary Wharton.

== Biography ==
Johnston was born about 1648, the only son of Sir George Johnston, 2nd Baronet by his wife, a daughter of Sir William Leslie, 3rd Baronet of Wardes. In 1660 his father had sold the family estate of Caskieben in Aberdeenshire to Sir John Keith, who renamed it Keith Hall. Johnston was a captain in the army, and served under King William III in Flanders and in Ireland, where he was present at the Battle of the Boyne.

In November 1690 Johnston aided his friend Captain James Campbell in the abduction and forced marriage of thirteen-year-old heiress Mary Wharton. Though Campbell escaped, for his part in the affair Johnston was hanged at Tyburn on 23 December 1690, aged forty-two. He was unmarried, and was succeeded by his cousin John Johnston of Newplace, a merchant at Aberdeen.

Baronetage of Nova Scotia
Preceded by George Johnston	Baronet (of Caskieben) c.1680–1690	Succeeded by John Johnston
