= William Bowles (naturalist) =

Irish naturalist (1705–1780)

William Bowles (1705 – 25 August 1780), was an Irish naturalist.

== Life ==
Bowles was born near Cork.

He gave up the legal profession, for which he was destined, and in 1740 went to Paris, where he studied natural history, chemistry, and metallurgy. He subsequently traveled through France, investigating its natural history and mineral and other productions.

In 1752, having become acquainted with Don Antonio de Ulloa, afterwards admiral of the Spanish fleet, Bowles was induced to enter the Spanish service, being appointed to superintend the state mines and to form a collection of natural history and fit up a chemical laboratory. He first visited the mercury mines of Almadén, which had been seriously damaged by fire, and the plans he suggested were successfully adopted for their resuscitation. He afterwards traveled through Spain, investigating its minerals and natural history, living chiefly at Madrid and Bilbao.

== Personal life ==
He married a German, Anna Rustein, who was pensioned by the king of Spain after her husband's death. Bowles is described as tall and fine-looking, generous, honourable, active, ingenious, and well informed. His society was much valued in the best Spanish circles. He died at Madrid on 25 August 1780.

== Legacy ==
The Apiaceae Bowlesia (Ruiz & Pav. 1794) is named in his honour.

== Works ==
Bowles's principal work was An Introduction to the Natural History and Physical Geography of Spain, published in Spanish at Madrid in 1775. It is not systematically arranged, but has very considerable value as being the first work of its kind. The second edition (1782) was edited by Don J. N. de Azara, who rendered considerable assistance to the author in preparing the first edition. It was translated into French by Vicomte de Flavigny (Paris, 1776). An Italian edition, much enlarged by Azara, then Spanish ambassador at Rome, was published at Parma in 1784.

Bowles was also the author of

- A Brief Account of the Spanish and German Mines (Phil. Trans. lvi.)
- A Letter on the Merino Sheep, &c. (Gent. Mag. May and June 1764)
- An Account of the Spanish Locusts (Madrid, 1781).

Sir John Talbot Dillon's Travels through Spain (London, 1781) is very largely an adaptation of Bowles.

== Bibliography ==
- Nathaniel Colgan (1911). An Irish Naturalist in Spain in the Eighteenth Century (pdf), The Irish Naturalist, vol. 20, No. 1 (Jan., 1911), pp. 1-5
- Gabriel Sánchez Espinosa (2002). The work of the Irish naturalist Guillermo Bowles and the editorial policy of the Spanish enlightened government, Queen’s University, Belfast. A translated summary (without footnotes) of his article “La obra del naturalista Guillermo Bowles y la política editorial del gobierno ilustrado”, Dieciocho 25 (2002), p. 255-280.
