= Lewis Saurin =

Anglican priest (died 1749)

Lewis Saurin (died 1749) was an Anglican priest in Ireland

The brother of Jacques Saurin, he was appointed Dean of Ardagh and Precentor of Christ Church Cathedral, Dublin on 22 March 1727. holding both posts until his death in 1749.

His son was Archdeacon of Dromore; his grandson, Bishop of Dromore; his great nephew, Attorney General for Ireland; and his great nephew, an Australian impresario.
