= John Monck Mason =

Irish politician and literary scholar

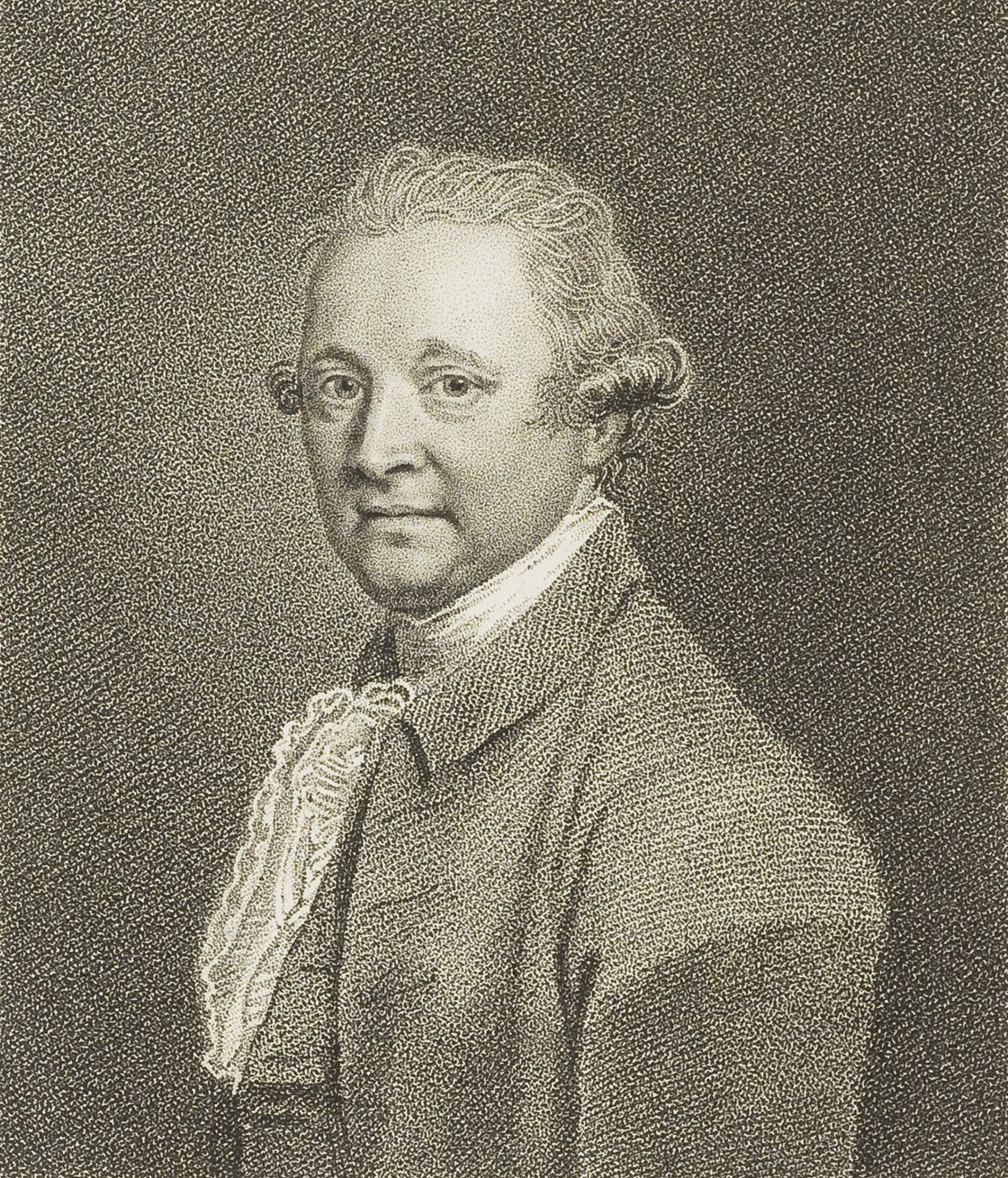
John Monck Mason

John Monck Mason (1726–1809) was an Irish politician and literary scholar.

== Life ==
Born in Dublin, he was eldest son of Robert Mason of Mason-Brook, County Galway, by Sarah, eldest daughter of George Monck of St. Stephen's Green, Dublin. On 12 August 1741 he entered Trinity College, Dublin, and graduated B.A. in 1746, M.A. in 1761. In 1752 he was called to the Irish bar.

Mason sat in the Irish House of Commons as member for Blessington, County Wicklow, in 1761 and 1769, and for St. Canice, County Kilkenny, in 1776, 1783, 1790, and 1798. In parliament he was a frequent speaker. He introduced in 1761 a bill to enable Roman Catholics to invest money in mortgages on land, which was carried, but then rejected by the English privy council. In the next session a similar bill, strongly opposed by the government, was rejected by 138 to 53.

The government made a bid for Mason's support by appointing him in August 1771 a commissioner of barracks and public works, Dublin, and in 1772 a commissioner of revenue, an office which he held until 1793; and Mason deserted the opposition. Again he introduced his mortgage measure in 1772, once more unsuccessfully. When Lord Harcourt's government, in 1773, wished to do something for the Catholics, Mason and Sir Hercules Langrishe were asked to bring in the same bill, together with another permitting Catholics to take leases for lives of lands; but both were suddenly dropped.

During the free trade agitation of 1779 Mason made himself very unpopular: in November of that year he explained to the Speaker that to attend the House would be a danger to his life. He was made a privy councillor, and in the last Irish parliament he voted for the Union with Great Britain.

Mason sold Mason-Brook to Denis Daly. He died in Dublin in 1809.

== Works ==
In 1779 Mason published in London an edition of the Dramatick Works of Philip Massinger (4 vols.) which the Dictionary of National Biography found no improvement on that of Thomas Coxeter (1761); the memoir by Thomas Davies was however praised at the time. He then worked on an edition of Shakespeare; but claimed that his changes were anticipated in Isaac Reed's edition of 1785, and published Comments on the last Edition of Shakespeare's Plays, London, 1785, with an appendix of Additional Comments. Another edition, as Comments on the several Editions of Shakespeare's Plays, extended to those of Malone and Steevens, appeared at Dublin in 1807. George Steevens inserted many of Mason's notes in his own editions of Shakespeare.

Mason also published Comments on the Plays of Beaumont and Fletcher; with an Appendix containing some further Observations on Shakespeare, London, 1798, dedicated to George Steevens; and An Oration commemorative of the late Major-General Hamilton, 1804.

== Family ==
In 1766 Mason married Catherine, second daughter of Henry Mitchell of Glasnevin, but left no issue. Her brother was Hugh Henry Mitchell, MP for Ballyshannon and for Enniskillen.

== Notes ==
Attribution

This article incorporates text from a publication now in the public domain: Lee, Sidney, ed. (1893). "Mason, John Monck". Dictionary of National Biography. Vol. 36. London: Smith, Elder & Co.

Parliament of Ireland
Preceded by Charles Ussher; George Smyth	Member of Parliament for Blessington; 1761–1768; With: Charles Ussher	Succeeded by Charles Ussher; George Smyth
Preceded by Charles Ussher; George Smyth	Member of Parliament for Blessington; 1769–1776; With: George Smyth 1769–1771; Charles Dunbar 1771–1776	Succeeded by Charles Dunbar; John Talbot Dillon
Preceded by Lord Frederick Campbell; Thomas Radcliffe	Member of Parliament for St Canice; 1776–1800; With: John Hamilton 1776–1781; Dominick Trant 1781–1783; Hon. Richard Annesley 1783–1790; Marcus Beresford 1790–1794; Sylvester Douglas 1794–1796; William Elliot 1796–1800	Union with Great Britain
