= Joseph Saurin =

French mathematician (1659–1737)

Joseph Saurin (1 September 1659, in Courthézon – 29 December 1737, in Paris) was a French mathematician and a converted Protestant minister. He was the first to show how the tangents at the multiple points of curves could be determined by mathematical analysis. He was accused in 1712 by Jean-Baptiste Rousseau of being the actual author of defamatory verses that gossip had attributed to Rousseau.

He was the father of Bernard-Joseph Saurin.

== Bibliography ==
An original entry was based on the book A Short Account of the History of Mathematics (4th edition, 1908) by W. W. Rouse Ball.

- Samuel Baur: Neues Historisch-Biographisch-Literarisches Handwörterbuch der größten Personen aller Zeiten. 4th ed., Stettinische Buchhhandlung, Ulm 1809, p. 860
