= Bartley Campbell =

American playwright

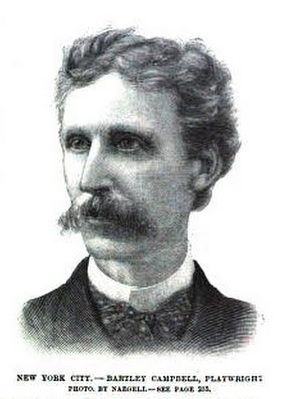
Bartley Campbell

Bartley Theodore Campbell (August 12, 1843 – July 30, 1888) was an American playwright of the latter 19th century.

== Early years ==
Campbell was born in Pittsburgh, Pennsylvania on August 12, 1843, to parents who had emigrated from Ireland. His writing career began at the age of 15 in 1858, when he took a job as a reporter for the Pittsburgh Post. He later became a drama critic for the Pittsburgh Leader, editor of the McKeesport Times, and founder of the Pittsburg Evening Mail and the Southern Monthly Magazine.

== Playwright years ==
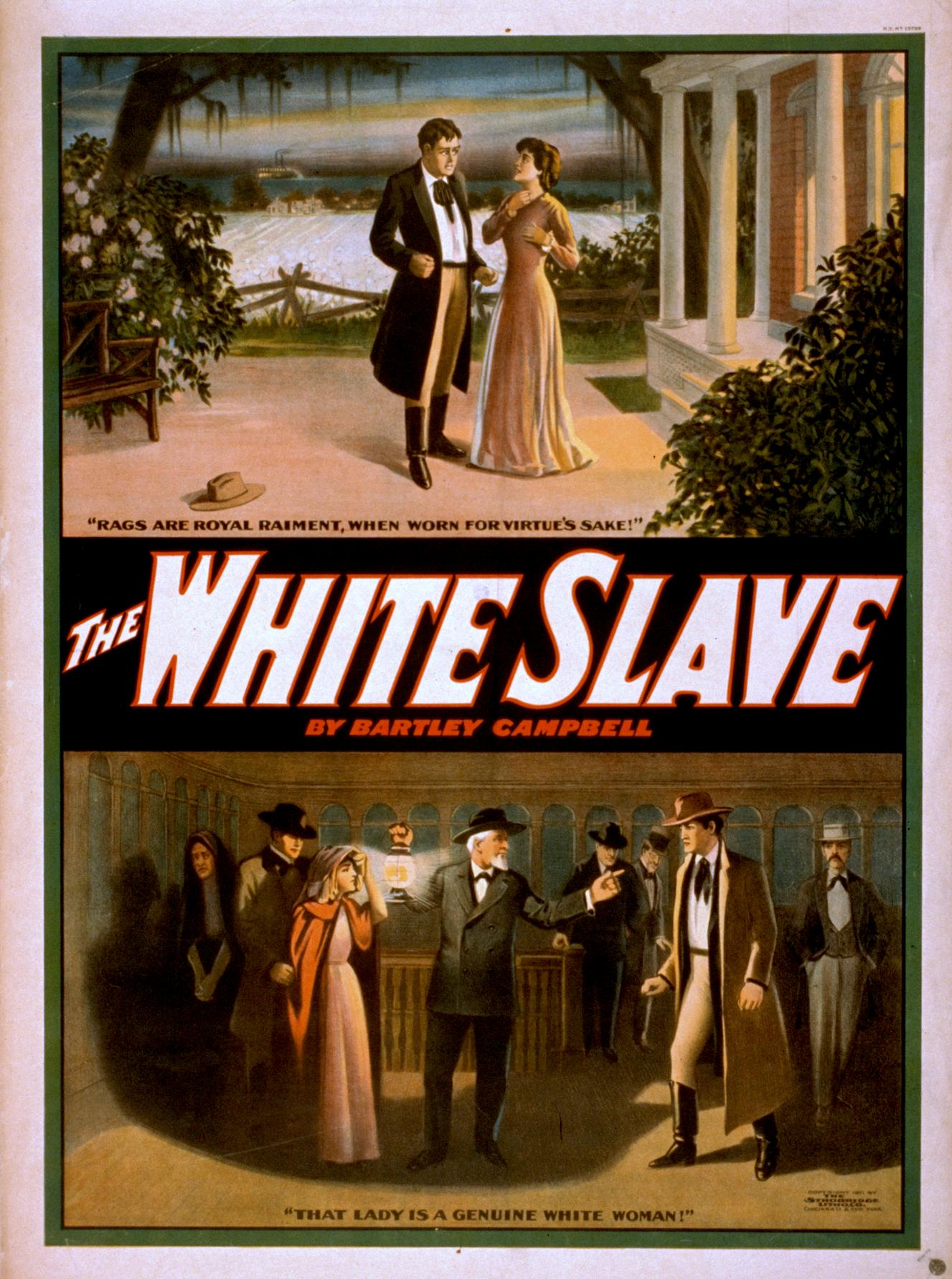
The White Slave

Campbell's playwright career began in 1871 with the play Through Fire, which ran for four weeks and motivated him to quit journalism. He wrote numerous plays for Pittsburgh's theatres which garnered him national attention. He was quite successful and is often noted as the first American to earn a living solely as a playwright; however, there is some debate about whether or not he was truly the first.

His other plays include Peril; or, Love at Long Branch (1872); Fate (1873); Risks; or, Insure Your Life, written for John Dillon (1873); The Virginian (1874); The Big Bonanza; My Partner (1879), The Galley Slave (1879); The White Slave (1882); Siberia (1882); and his final play, Paquita (1885).

== Final years ==
Campbell's health deteriorated under the strain of financial difficulties associated with his efforts to act as author, producer, and director of his plays. He was declared insane in September 1886 and died in the State Hospital for the Insane in Middletown, New York on July 30, 1888. He is buried in St. Mary Cemetery in Pittsburgh's Lawrenceville neighborhood.

== Sources ==
- A history of the New York stage, Volume 2 By Thomas Allston Brown
