= John Reilly (Irish politician) =

Anglo-Irish politician (1745–1804)

John Reilly (1745 – 26 July 1804) was an Irish politician.

Reilly was the Member of Parliament for Blessington in the Irish House of Commons from 1779 until the seat's disenfranchisement under the Acts of Union 1800.

Parliament of Ireland
Preceded by John Talbot Dillon; Charles Dunbar	Blessington; 1779–1800; With: John Talbot Dillon (1779–1783); Sir Richard Johnston, Bt (1783–1796); David Ker (1796–1798); Richard Annesley (1798–1800); William Saurin (1800)	Succeeded by Constituency disenfranchised
