= Jason (opera) =

Opera by Pascal Collasse

Jason, ou La toison d'or (Jason, or The Golden Fleece) is an opera by the French composer Pascal Collasse, first performed at the Académie Royale de Musique (the Paris Opéra) on 15 January 1696. It takes the form of a tragédie lyrique in a prologue and five acts. The libretto, by Jean-Baptiste Rousseau, is based on the legend of Jason in the epic poem Argonautica by Apollonius of Rhodes.

== Sources ==
- (in French) Libretto at "Livrets baroques"
- (in French) Félix Clément and Pierre Larousse Dictionnaire des Opéras, Paris, 1881.
