= Jean-Baptiste Rousseau =

French playwright and poet (1671–1741)

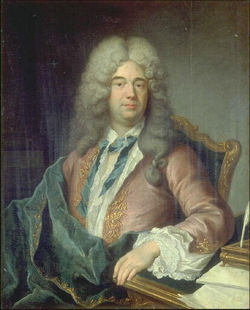
Jean-Baptiste Rousseau

Jean-Baptiste Rousseau (6 April 1671 – 17 March 1741) was a French playwright and poet, particularly noted for his cynical epigrams.

== Biography ==
Rousseau was born in Paris, the son of a shoemaker, and was well educated. As a young man, he gained favour with Boileau, who encouraged him to write. Rousseau began with the theatre, for which he had no aptitude. A one-act comedy, Le Café, failed in 1694, and he was not much happier with a more ambitious play, Le Flatteur (1696), or with the opera Venus et Adonis (1697). In 1700 he tried another comedy, Le Capricieux, which had the same fate. He then went with the duke of Tallard as an attaché to London, and, in days when literature still led to high position, seemed likely to achieve success.

His misfortunes began with a club squabble at the Café Laurent, which was much frequented by literary men, and where he indulged in lampoons on his companions. A shower of libellous and sometimes obscene verses was written by or attributed to him, and at last he was turned out of the café. At the same time his poems, as yet printed only singly or in manuscript, acquired him a great reputation, due to the dearth of genuine lyrical poetry between Jean Racine and André Chénier. In 1701 he was made a member of the Académie des inscriptions; he was offered, though he had not accepted, profitable places in the revenue department; he had become a favourite of the libertine but influential côterie of the Temple; and in 1710 he presented himself as a candidate for the Académie française.

Verses more offensive than ever were handed round, and gossip maintained that Rousseau was their author. Legal proceedings of various kinds followed, and Rousseau ascribed the lampoon to Bernard-Joseph Saurin. In 1712 Rousseau was prosecuted for defamation of character, and, on his non-appearance in court, was condemned to perpetual exile. He spent the rest of his life in foreign countries except for a clandestine visit to Paris in 1738; he refused to accept the permission to return which was offered him in 1716 because it was not accompanied by complete rehabilitation.

Prince Eugene of Savoy and other persons of distinction took him under their protection during his exile, and at Soleure he printed the first edition of his poetical works. He met Voltaire in Brussels in 1722. Voltaire's Le Pour et le contre is said to have shocked Rousseau, who expressed his sentiments freely. At any rate the latter had thenceforward no fiercer enemy than Voltaire. His death elicited from Jean-Jacques Lefranc, marquis de Pompignan an ode that was perhaps better than anything of Rousseau's own work. That work may be roughly divided into two sections. One consists of formal and partly sacred odes and cantatas of the stiffest character, of which perhaps the Ode a la fortune is the most famous; the other of brief epigrams, sometimes licentious and always, or almost always, ill-natured.

As an epigrammatist Rousseau is inferior only to his friend Alexis Piron. The frigidity of conventional diction and the disuse of all really lyrical rhythm which characterize his period do not prevent his odes and cantatas from showing at times true poetical faculty, though cramped, and inadequate to explain his extraordinary vogue. Few writers were so frequently reprinted during the 18th century, but even in his own century La Harpe had arrived at a truer estimate of his real value when he said of his poetry: "Le fond n'est qu'un lieu commun chargé de déclamations et même d'idées fausses."

Besides the Soleure edition mentioned above, Rousseau published an issue of his work in London in 1723.

== Works ==
- Le Café, comedy in one act, in prose (1694)
- Jason, opera in five acts, in verse (1696)
- Le Flatteur, comedy in five acts, in verse (1698)
- Vénus et Adonis, opera in five acts, in verse (1697)
- Le Capricieux, comedy in five acts, in verse (1700)
- La Noce de village, masque (1700)
- La Ceinture magique, comedy in one act, in prose (1701)
- Œuvres (Works), (1712)
- Odes, cantates, épigrammes et poésies diverses, 2 vol. (1723)
- L'Hypocondre, comedy, unpublished
- La Dupe de lui-même, comedy, unpublished
- La Mandragore, comedy, unpublished
- Les Aïeux chimériques, comedy, unpublished
- Lettres sur différents sujets de littérature (Letters about various literary subjects) (after 1750)
