= John Dillon (comedian) =

American actor & comedian (1831–1913)

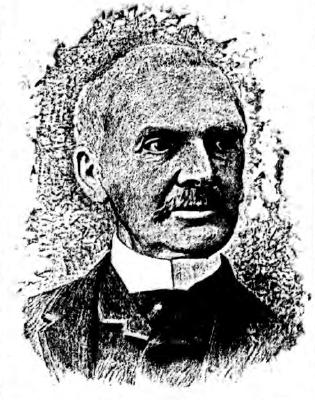
- Born: John Daily Marum; October 2, 1831; Ireland
- Died: April 21, 1913 (aged 81); Chicago, U.S.
- Occupations: Actor, comedian

John Dillon (born John Daily Marum; October 2, 1831 – April 21, 1913) was an Irish-American comedian based in Chicago and popular in the central part of the United States in the late 19th century.

Dillon was born in County Kilkenny, Ireland, on October 2, 1831, and came to the United States at age 17 in 1848. Making his way from New York City to Buffalo, and then to Chicago, he started doing factory work. He later began playing small theater roles, debuting in Milwaukee in May 1854. He later went back in Chicago, where he joined the McVicker's Theatre company.

After a few years, Dillon went to New York and joined Laura Keene's company in 1862, and gained attention for his comedic skills. From 1864 to 1866, he was the head comedian at Wood's Museum. He then moved back to Chicago, touring the West frequently and becoming a "household word." In 1875, he returned to New York to appear in A. Oakey Hall's play The Crucible. He continued to perform through the 1880s and 1890s.

Dillon died in Chicago on April 21, 1913.

== Selected performances ==
- The Seven Sons (1862)
- Risks; or, Insure Your Life (1873) (written by Bartley Campbell)
- The Crucible (play) (1875) (written by A. Oakey Hall)
- Our Boys (play) (1877, managed by Charles Frohman)
- State's Attorney (1882)
- Wanted, the Earth (1887 play by Gus Heege)
- A Model Husband (play) (1892)
- Bartlett's Road To Seltzerville (1899)

== Personal ==
Dillon was married at least twice, and had two daughters.

His first wife was Helen Louise Allen, whom he married in 1856. She was a sister of the wife of Jack Langrishe, who along with J.B. Atwater, ran the Milwaukee theatre where Dillon was playing at that time.

His second wife was actress Mary Louise Hernandez (known as Louise Dillon). They married on October 3, 1872, in Sioux City, Iowa. She obtained a divorce in 1882, complaining that Dillon was a habitual drunk. There are indications that Dillon liked to drink, with periods of abstinence, as an 1879 profile of Dillon describes him as "determined never to invoke the pleasures of Bacchus again. He is as much opposed to the reign of that god now as he was his votary years ago." And a short newspaper blurb in 1892 reported Dillon was a member of the "Chicago Bi-Chloride of Gold Club" (which references a treatment for alcoholism popular in the 1890s), and "certainly should now be 'a model husband' if he never was before." "A Model Husband" was also the name of his most recent play at that time.
