= Bernard-Joseph Saurin =

French writer (1706–1781)

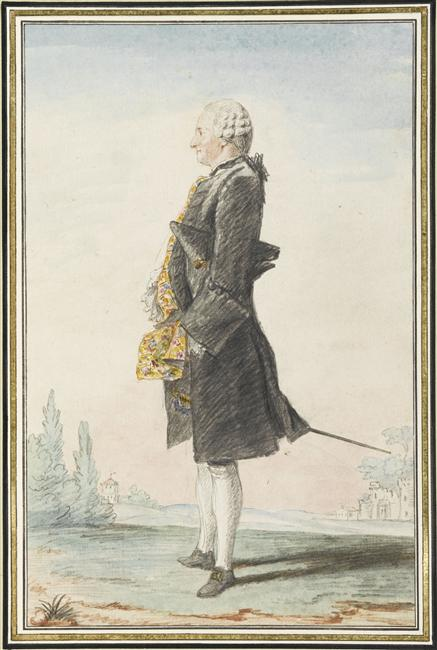
Bernard-Joseph Saurin. Portrait by Louis Carrogis dit Carmontelle, 1761. Chantilly, Musée Condé.

Bernard-Joseph Saurin (1706 in Paris – 17 November 1781 in Paris) was a lawyer, poet, and playwright.

== Biography ==
Saurin was the son of Joseph Saurin, a converted Protestant minister and mathematician who had been accused in 1712 by Jean-Baptiste Rousseau of being the actual author of defamatory verses that gossip had attributed to Rousseau.

Attracted to literature, and frequenting the Society of the Caveau, he became a lawyer at Parliament, a career which he did not like, but endured for fifteen years in order to support his family. His professional life in the theatre began when he was forty.

Neither his comedy Les Trois rivaux (The Three Rivals), nor his tragedy Aménophis met with success, which came in 1760 with the tragedy Spartacus and the comedy Les Mœurs du temps (The Manners of the Time), which were applauded at the Comédie-Française. In the following year, the author was elected a member of the Académie française.

He attended the literary cafes and the salons of Madame de Staël, Mme de Tencin, Madame Geoffrin and Madame d'Épinay. Friend of Voltaire, Saint-Lambert, Montesquieu, Turgot and Helvétius, he could be regarded as one of the philosophers.

He translated some English works into French, and saw some of his works translated in turn into English. Among the better known of his plays was Béverlei (1768), a tragedy.

== Works ==
=== Theatre ===
Works are listed chronologically and include links to the text in Gallica at the Bibliothèque nationale de France when available :

- Aménophis, a tragedy which premiered at the Comédie-Française on 12 November 1752
- Spartacus, a tragedy which premiered at the Comédie-Française on 20 February 1760, revived in February 1772 and on 20 August 1818
- Les Mœurs du temps, a prose comedy in one act, which premiered at the Comédie-Française on 22 December 1760 (It was revived 69 times between 1760 and 1785)
- Blanche et Guiscard, in imitation of the English Comedy Tancred and Sigismunda by James Thomson, was presented for the first time at the Comédie-Française on 25 September 1763
- L'Orpheline léguée, a comedy in 3 acts in free verse, Fontainebleau, Comédiens français ordinaires du Roi, 5 November 1765; Paris, 6 November 1765
- Béverlei, in imitation of the English tragedy The Gamester by Edward Moore, in five acts and in free verse, Paris, Comédiens français, 7 May 1768
- L'Anglomane, ou l'Orpheline léguée, a comedy in one act and in free verse, Fontainebleau, Comédiens français, 5 November 1772; Paris, 23 November 1772
- Sophie Francourt, a prose comedy in 4 acts, Paris, Comédiens italiens ordinaires du Roi, 18 February 1783
