= John Talbot Dillon (author) =

Anglo-Irish author (1734–1806)

John Talbot Dillon (1734–1806) was an Anglo-Irish naval officer, traveller and historian.

== Life ==
He was the son of Francis Dillon and Mary Wingfield, and was educated at Westminster School.

He spent extensive time abroad, travelling in Italy and Spain.

Dillon was an advocate of religious liberty, a believer in the moderation of the French Revolution, and an opponent of the emancipation of slaves. He is described as "baron of the Sacred Roman Empire" on the title-page of his Travels in Spain (1780), as well as in notes to John Bowle's edition of Don Quixote (1781).

== Slavery as necessary evil ==
According to his biography, he was an admirer of revolution, but "with all his enthusiasm for liberty, however, he was not disposed to extend it to the negroes in the West Indies. ‘God forbid,’ he says, ‘I should be an advocate for slavery as a system;’ but in their particular case he regarded it as a necessary evil, and believed that upon the whole they were far better off as slaves than they would be if set free."

== Legacy and death ==
Bowle, in the preface and notes to his edition of Don Quixote, acknowledges his obligations to Dillon for critical suggestions received during the progress of his work; and Joseph Baretti speaks of him with respect while attacking Bowle in Tolondron (1786).

== Works ==
Dillon's published works were:

- Travels through Spain … in a series of Letters, including the most interesting subjects contained in the Memoirs of Don G. Bowles and other Spanish writers, London, 1780. It was based on his own observations but relied also William Bowles's Introduction to the Natural History and Physical Geography of Spain (1775). It had four or five editions, was translated into German in 1782, and became an authority on the condition of Spain in the reign of King Charles III. It was followed the next year by his Letters from an English Traveller in Spain in 1778, on the Origin and Progress of Poetry in that Kingdom; the preface acknowledged the use of Velazquez's Origenes de la Poesía Castellana, Sarmiento and Sedano. It was translated, with additions, into French in 1810, under the title Essai sur la Littérature Espagnole.
- Letters from an English Traveller in Spain in 1778 … with illustrations of the romance of Don Quixote, London, 1781.
- A Political Survey of the Sacred Roman Empire, London, 1782. On the constitution and structure of the Holy Roman Empire.
- Sketches on the Art of Painting London, 1782. A translation from the Spanish of Mengs's letter to Antonio Ponz.
- History of the Reign of Pedro the Cruel, London, 1788, 2 vols. Translated into French in 1790.
- Historical and Critical Memoirs of the General Revolution in France in the year 1789 … produced from authentic papers communicated by M. Hugon de Bassville, London, 1790. A collection of original documents, and the views of a contemporary observer.
- Foreign Agriculture, London, 1796. Translated from the French of the Chevalier de Monroy.
- Alphonso and Eleonora, or the Triumphs of Valour and Virtue, London, 1800, 2 vols. A history of Alfonso VIII of Castile.

== Notes ==
Attribution

This article incorporates text from a publication now in the public domain: Ormsby, John (1888). "Dillon, John Talbot". Dictionary of National Biography. Vol. 15. pp. 84–85.
