= Blessington (Parliament of Ireland constituency) =

Pre-1801 Irish constituency

- Former borough constituency for the Irish House of Commons
- County: County Wicklow
- Borough: Blessington

1670–1801
- Seats: 2
- Replaced by: Disfranchised

Blessington in County Wicklow was a constituency represented in the Irish House of Commons from 1670 until 1800.

== History ==
In the Patriot Parliament of 1689 summoned by King James II, Blessington was represented with two members.

== Members of Parliament, 1670–1801 ==
Election	First MP	Second MP
1689	James Eustace	Maurice Eustace
1692	William Crowe	Sir Richard Levinge
1695	Denny Muschamp	Gideon Delaune
1703	William Crowe	John Jephson
1711	Hon. Charles Boyle	John Jephson
1719	David Dunbar	John Jephson
1724	David Dunbar	Joseph Slattery
November 1727	Sir Richard Levinge, 2nd Bt	Anthony Malone (Note: Also elected for County Westmeath in 1727, for which he chose to sit)
1727	Sir Richard Levinge, 2nd Bt	Patrick French
1745	Sir Richard Levinge, 2nd Bt	Charles Ussher
1748	Joseph Kelly	Charles Ussher
1749	Francis McCartney	Charles Ussher
1759	George Smyth	Charles Ussher
1761	John Monck Mason	Charles Ussher
1768	George Smyth	Charles Ussher
1769	John Monck Mason	Charles Ussher
1771	John Monck Mason	Charles Dunbar
1776	John Talbot Dillon	Charles Dunbar
1779	John Talbot Dillon	John Reilly
October 1783	William Montgomery (Note: Also elected for Hillsborough in 1783, for which he chose to sit)	John Reilly
1783	Sir Richard Johnston, 1st Bt	John Reilly
1796	David Ker	John Reilly
1798	Richard Annesley	John Reilly
1800	William Saurin	John Reilly
1801	Disenfranchised	

== Bibliography ==
- O'Hart, John (2007). The Irish and Anglo-Irish Landed Gentry: When Cromwell came to Ireland. Vol. II. Heritage Books. ISBN 0-7884-1927-7.
- Leigh Rayment's historical List of Members of the Irish House of Commons. Cites: Johnston-Liik, Edith Mary (2002). The History of the Irish Parliament 1692-1800 (6 volumes). Ulster Historical Foundation.
