= William Saurin =

Irish barrister and politician (1757–1839)

William Saurin (1757 – 11 February 1839) was an Irish barrister, Crown official and politician. He was Attorney-General for Ireland from 1807 to 1822, and for much of that period, he acted as the effective head of the Irish Government. He was unusual among Irish Law Officers in that he was never appointed a judge, nor wished to become one. As an Ulster Protestant, and a determined opponent of Catholic Emancipation, he incurred the bitter enmity of Daniel O'Connell, who called him "the mortal foe", and worked for years to have him removed from office.

== Family ==
Saurin was born in Belfast, second of the four sons of the Reverend James Saurin, Vicar of Belfast (died 1774) and his wife Jane Duff. James Saurin, Bishop of Dromore, was his younger brother.

The Saurins were of French Huguenot descent (no doubt this is why Daniel O'Connell called William an "insolent transplanted Frenchman"). The family, who were originally from Nimes, fled from France after the revocation of the Edict of Nantes in 1685. Even a century later, this episode, according to his friends, made a deep impression on William.

Louis Saurin, Dean of Ardagh, the first of the family to settle in Ireland, (he was a brother of the celebrated preacher Jacques Saurin, who converted to Catholicism, and then back to the Reformed faith), was William's grandfather.

== Education and early career ==
He was educated at Duboudien's School, a well-regarded private academy in Lisburn, and at Trinity College Dublin, where he took his Bachelor of Arts degree in 1777. He entered Lincoln's Inn and was called to the Bar in 1780. After a slow start in his profession, he became one of its acknowledged leaders; despite his later eminence he was at first considered something of a "plodder".

== Legal and political career ==
Saurin was a passionate opponent of the Act of Union and endeavoured, without success, to persuade the Irish Bar as a body to oppose it. He then entered the Irish House of Commons as member for Blessington, in order to combat the achievement of the Union.

His speeches against the Union were considered to be among the finest on the topic. He

denied the right of the legislature to alienate its sacred trust. He insisted that it would amount to a forfeiture of that estate which was derived from and held under the people, in whom the reversion must perpetually remain; that they were bound to consult the will of the majority of the nation, and that the will of the majority was the foundation of all law.

Castlereagh denounced the speech as an incitement to rebellion and compared Saurin to Thomas Paine. Others noted that by "the nation" Saurin meant the Protestant ruling class with whose interests he wholly identified: never, according to his critics, did he admit that the Catholic majority had any rights at all.

That he was appointed Attorney-General for Ireland despite his opposition to the Union and his repeated refusal to stand for the post-Union Parliament is a tribute to his legal eminence (although Daniel O'Connell inevitably accused him of political time-serving).

=== Attorney-General for Ireland ===
His tenure as Attorney-General is remarkable not only for its length, but also for his effective dominance of the Irish administration, a position never equalled by any other holder of the office (with the possible exception of Philip Tisdall, Attorney General 1760–1777). The fact that the Lord Lieutenant of Ireland was usually an absentee appointment and that the Lord Chancellor of Ireland, Lord Manners, was not familiar with the Irish political scene, gave Saurin the opportunity to direct the Irish Government, an opportunity of which he took full advantage. Sir Robert Peel, Chief Secretary for Ireland 1812–1818, was said to be wholly in sympathy with Saurin, although Peel was later to radically alter his own position on Catholic Emancipation.

As an Ulster Protestant, of Huguenot origin, it was perhaps natural that he should combine sympathy for the Orange Order with hostility to Catholic emancipation; but his perceived bias against Catholics destroyed his popularity. As early as 1813 his enemy Daniel O'Connell tried to turn the trial of the publisher John Magee for libel into an indictment of Saurin's anti-Catholic bias, although at the time these attacks did not greatly damage him; indeed O'Connell's personal attacks on Saurin, whom he called "stupid and vulgar", may have aroused sympathy for him. Saurin's prejudice against Catholics, sharpened by his personal feud with O'Connell, grew stronger until it became a matter of serious political concern; and while the Crown succeeded in convicting Magee, it failed to secure convictions in other related trials such as that of Dr. Sheridan.

=== Dismissal ===
Saurin's effective control of the Dublin administration was well known to, and for many years taken for granted by the British Government; in time however, his inflexible opinions and unpopularity made him a political liability. The publication of a letter he wrote to John Toler, the Chief Justice of the Irish Common Pleas, urging him to use his influence with Protestant juries to secure the conviction of Catholics in political cases, irrespective of whether they were innocent or guilty, did great damage to both of their reputations. In due course, the decision was taken to remove him from office as Attorney General, but to compensate him by appointment to the Bench. In 1822 the new Lord Lieutenant, Lord Wellesley, offered him the vacant position of Lord Chief Justice of the King's Bench for Ireland; when Saurin, who had never shown any interest in going on the Bench, refused, he was dismissed from the Attorney General's Office outright, a decision which seems to have come as an utterly unexpected blow to Saurin. Saurin's anti-Catholic bias is also said to have offended Wellesley's second wife, Marianne, who was a Catholic. Daniel O'Connell exulted in "the downfall of our mortal foe". Wellesley, who was accused of treating Saurin harshly, said that short of offering him the Lord Lieutenancy itself, he did not see what more he could have done. Saurin retained some indirect political influence until the enactment of Catholic Emancipation in 1829 finally ended his political career.

Despite his increasing age he returned to private practice for some years, and became "Father of the Bar" (that is, its longest serving member). In that capacity, he gave the farewell address to the departing Lord Chancellor, Sir Anthony Hart, in 1830.

== Personal life ==
Saurin married Mary O'Brien, daughter of Edward Dominic O'Brien and Mary Carrick. She was the sister of William O'Brien, 2nd Marquess of Thomond, and James O'Brien, 3rd Marquess of Thomond, and the widow of Sir Richard Eyre Cox, 4th Baronet (died 1783). She and William had four sons, including Edward, James and Mark, and one daughter. Their eldest son, Edward (died 1878), became an Admiral and married Lady Mary Ryder (died 1900), daughter of the prominent statesman Dudley Ryder, 1st Earl of Harrowby and his wife Susanna Leveson Gower. The celebrated Australian actor William Saurin Lyster was William's nephew.

Saurin died at his home at St. Stephen's Green, Dublin, in January 1839; his widow died the following year. He also owned Carysfort House, Stillorgan, and held substantial lands in County Tipperary.

=== Character and appearance ===
He was described as small and decidedly "French" in appearance (hence O'Connell's gibe about his being a "transplanted Frenchman"); his face was dominated by shaggy eyebrows, under which his black eyes had a piercing but not unkindly expression. His private life was blameless and despite his anti-Catholic bias, his character was described as honourable and affectionate.

Parliament of Ireland
Preceded by John Reilly; Richard Annesley	Member of Parliament for Blessington; February–August 1800; With: John Reilly	Constituency abolished
Political offices
Preceded by William Plunket	Attorney-General for Ireland; 1807–1822	Succeeded by William Plunket
