= John T. Dillon (businessman) =

American businessman

John T. Dillon (September 7, 1938 – February 28, 2023) was an American businessman who was the chairman and chief executive officer of International Paper from 1996 to 2003.

== Early life ==
Dillon was born in 1938 in Schroon Lake, New York. He earned an AAS in pre-professional forestry from Paul Smith's College in 1958, a BA from the University of Hartford in 1966 and an MBA from Columbia Business School in 1971. He joined International Paper in 1965 as a sales trainee. He became President and COO in 1995 and Chairman and CEO in 1996. He held these positions until he retired in 2003.

Prior to his appointment as chairman and CEO, Dillon served as president and chief operation officer of International Paper.

Dillon also served as a director on other corporate boards, including Caterpillar Inc. beginning in 1997, DuPont beginning in 2004, Kellogg Co. and Vertis. He was the vice chairman of Evercore Capital Partners.

Dillon was also a member of The Business Council. Dillon was a chairman of The Business Roundtable and American Forest and Paper Association, a member of the President's Advisory Council on Trade Policy and Negotiations and served as chairman of the National Council on Economic Education.

== Personal life and death ==
Dillon lived in Greenwich, Connecticut. He died on February 28, 2023, at the age of 84.
