= James Saurin (priest) =

Irish Anglican priest (1798–1879)

James Saurin (6 February 1798 – 11 May 1879) was an Anglican priest in Ireland in the nineteenth century. The Saurins were a Huguenot family who came to Ireland from Nimes in France in the 1720s.

The son of another James Saurin (Bishop of Dromore from 1819 to 1842) and Elizabeth Lyster, he was born in County Dublin and educated at Trinity College, Dublin. He was vicar of Seagoe parish and Archdeacon of Dromore from 1832 until his death in 1879.

He married firstly Emily Simpson of Bath, Somerset, who died in 1838, and secondly Emma Elizabeth Egerton-Warburton, daughter of Reverend Rowland Egerton and Emma Croxton of Norley, Cheshire, and sister of Rowland Egerton-Warburton and Peter Egerton-Warburton. She died in 1891. By his first marriage he had three daughters, one of whom died in infancy.
