= Jacques Saurin =

French Huguenot minister (1677–1730)

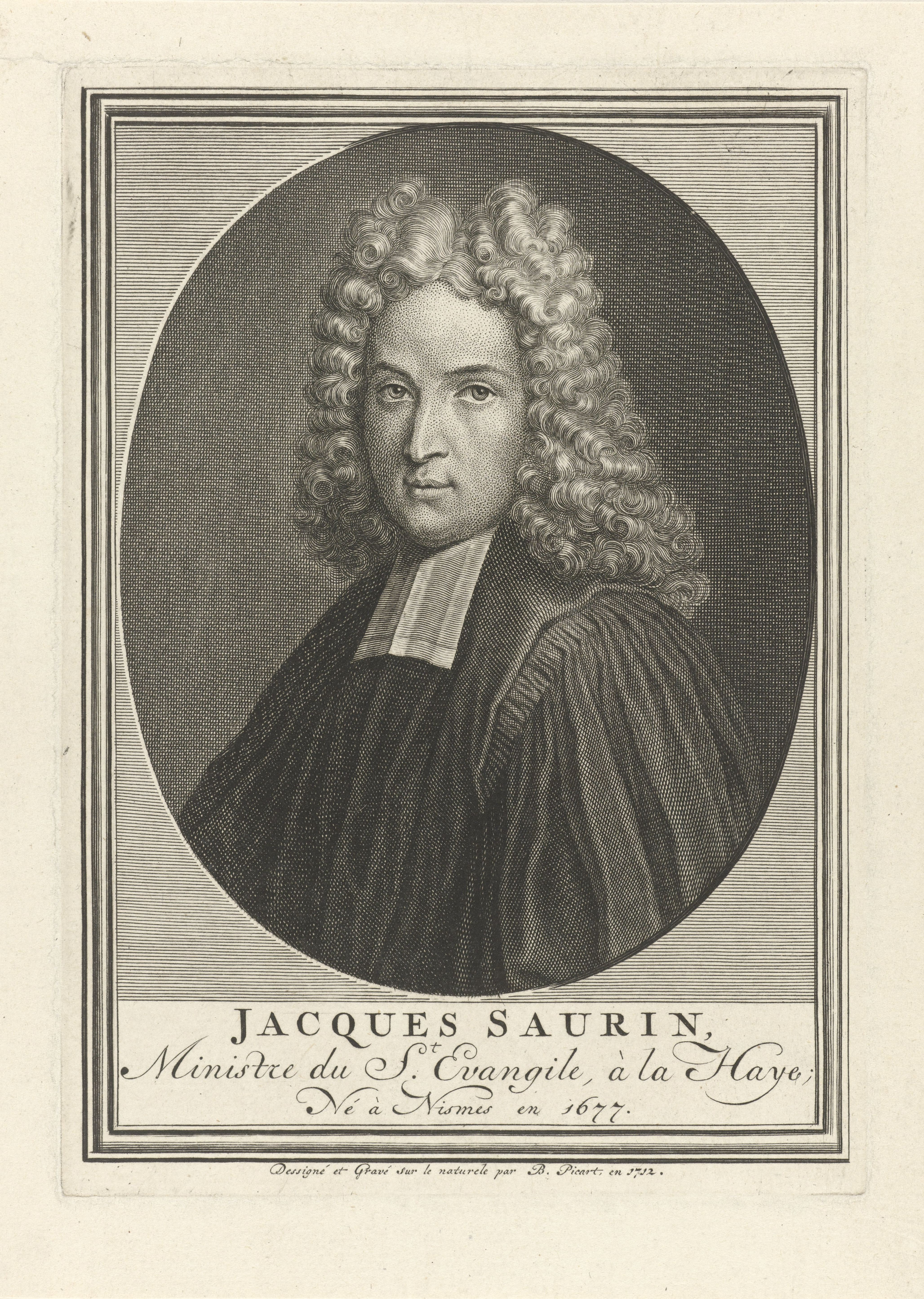
- Born: January 6, 1677; Nîmes, France
- Died: December 30, 1730 (aged 53); The Hague
- Occupation: Preacher

Jacques Saurin (January 6, 1677 – December 30, 1730) was a major French religious figure in the late 17th century and early 18th century who was particularly well-known as a preacher.

== Early life and education ==
Jacques Saurin was born in Nîmes, France on January 6, 1677. He was the oldest child of Jean Saurin (1632–1705), a lawyer and the secretary of the Academy of Nîmes, and Hippolyte de Tournière. Jacques Saurin had three younger siblings: Louis, Marc-Antoine, and Anne-Marie. Saurin and his siblings were raised as huguenots.

In 1685, when the Edict of Nantes was revoked by Louis XIV, Saurin and his family were forced to flee from France. The family ultimately settled in Geneva, Switzerland. There, Saurin studied theology and philosophy.

Saurin's studies were briefly interrupted in 1694, when he decided to volunteer to serve in the army of Victor Amadeus II of Sardinia during the Nine Years' War against Louis XIV. He remained in the army until the Treaty of Ryswick was signed in 1697. He then returned to his studies in Geneva where he was taught by Louis Tronchin, Bénédict Pictet, and Jean-Alphonse Turrettini. He completed his studies on July 5, 1700.

== Career ==
In 1700, Saurin moved briefly to Holland before settling in London, England. There, in 1701 he was appointed to serve as a pastor for a Walloon church. He also served as a chaplain for a regiment of soldiers stationed in England.

London's weather, unfortunately, did not agree with Saurin's health, and after only four years, he decided to leave England. In 1705, he settled in The Hague. There, he underwent a religious conversion experience and became a pastor of the Reformed Church of France.

== Personal life ==
In 1703, Saurin married Catherine Boitoult. Together, they had five children between 1707 and 1724: Philippe, Antoine, Jeanne-Isabelle, Jacques-Antoine and Guillaume-Sicco.

His brother Louis moved to Ireland around 1727. He had numerous descendants, of whom the most notable was his grandson William Saurin, for many years Attorney General for Ireland, and a key figure in the Irish administration.

== Major works ==
- Sermons sur divers textes de l'Écriture Sainte, The Hague, 1708-1725
- Discours historiques, critiques, théologiques et moraux sur les événements les plus mémorables du Vieux et du Nouveau Testament, Amsterdam, 1720-1728
- Abrégé de la théologie et de la morale chrétiennes, en forme de catéchisme, Amsterdam, 1722
- État du christianisme en France, The Hague, 1725
- Nouveau Sermons sur la Passion, Rotterdam, 1732
