= John Talbot Dillon =

Irish politician (1739–1805)

Sir John Talbot Dillon, 1st Baronet, Baron Dillon (1739 – 17 July 1805) was an Irish politician and baronet.

== Career ==
Dillon was the son of Arthur Dillon and Elizabeth Lambert, daughter of Ralph Lambert; and grandson of Sir John Dillon of Lismullen, knight, and Member of Parliament for Meath. Dillon sat in the Parliament of Ireland, representing Wicklow from 1771 to 1776, and then Blessington from 1776 to 1783.

Dillon may have spent time in Vienna, and enjoyed the favour of the Emperor Joseph II, from whom he received the title of Baron Dillon, of the Holy Roman Empire, on 4 July 1783. He used this title after recognition by King George III per Royal Licence on 22 February 1784. In the obituary notice in the Gentleman's Magazine for September 1805 it is said that this honour was conferred in recognition of his services in parliament on behalf of Catholics; and the date is given as 1782, which is repeated in the Baronetages of William Betham and Foster.

== Family ==
Dillon married Millicent Drake in 1767, with whom he had one son Charles Drake Dillon, who succeeded him as second baronet. His first wife died on 28 May 1768. Dillon remarried the following year, to Sarah Miller, with whom he had five further sons and two daughters. He was created a baronet of the United Kingdom by King George III in 1801, and died in Dublin on 31 August 1805.

Parliament of Ireland
Preceded by Edward Tighe; William Whitshed	Member of Parliament for Wicklow; 1771–1776; With: Edward Tighe	Succeeded by Edward Tighe; Sir William Fownes, 2nd Bt
Preceded by John Monck Mason; Charles Dunbar	Member of Parliament for Blessington; 1776–1783; With: Charles Dunbar 1771–1779; John Reilly 1779–1783	Succeeded by John Reilly; William Montgomery
Baronetage of the United Kingdom
New title	Baronet (of Lismullen); 1801–1805	Succeeded by Charles Dillon
German nobility of the Holy Roman Empire
New title	Baron Dillon; 1783–1805	Succeeded by Charles Dillon
