= Anthony Browne (1552–1592) =

English noble

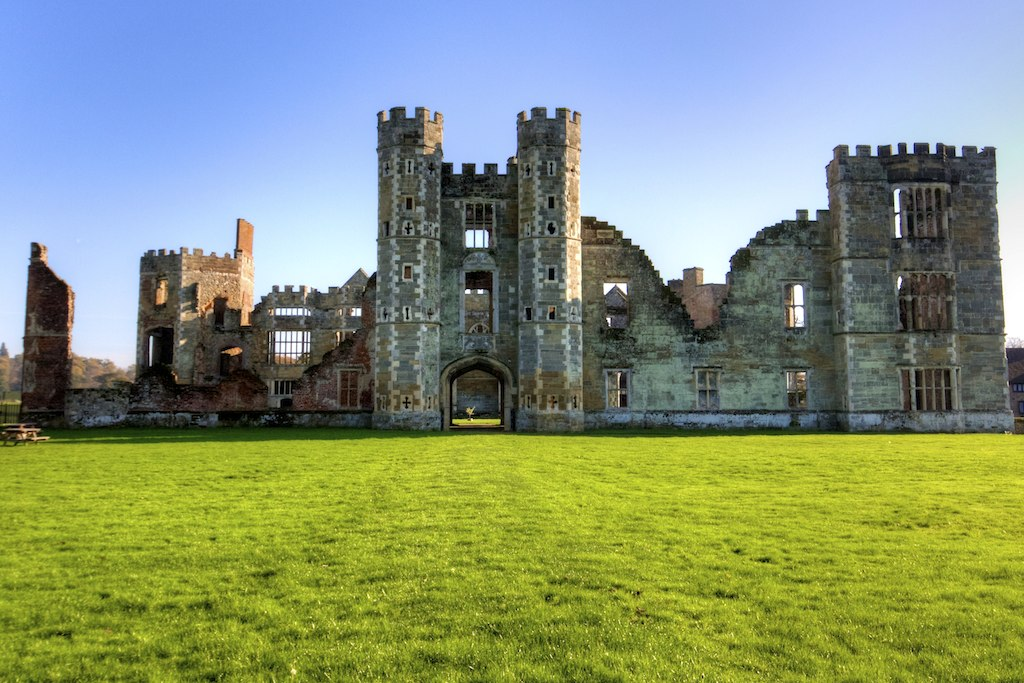
- The ruins of Cowdray House, Browne's birthplace
- Born: 22 July 1552; Cowdray House, Midhurst, Sussex
- Died: 29 June 1592 (aged 39); Riverbank House, Cowdray, Sussex
- Noble family: Browne
- Spouse: Mary Dormer
- Issue: Anthony-Maria Browne, 2nd Viscount Montagu; John Browne; Dorothy Browne; Jane Browne; Katherine Browne
- Father: Anthony Browne, 1st Viscount Montagu
- Mother: Jane Radcliffe

Anthony Browne (22 July 1552 – 29 June 1592) was Sheriff of Surrey and of Kent in 1580. The heir to a great estate in Sussex, he predeceased his father by four months. Aside from his own progeny, his sister Mary married Henry Wriothesley, 2nd Earl of Southampton who gave birth to Henry Wriothesley, 3rd Earl of Southampton.

== Life ==
Browne was born at Cowdray House, Midhurst, Sussex, in 1552, the eldest son and heir of Anthony Browne, 1st Viscount Montagu (1528–1592), by his first marriage to Lady Jane Radcliffe, a daughter of Robert Radcliffe, 1st Earl of Sussex. He had a twin sister, Mary (1552–1607; later Countess of Southampton), but their mother, Lady Jane, died in childbirth. Their grandfather was another Sir Anthony Browne (died 1548), knight of the shire for Surrey, and their great-grandfather, Sir Anthony Browne (died 1506) held the office of Standard Bearer of England. By 1558 their father, Lord Montagu, had married secondly Magdalen Dacre, by whom he had three further sons, George, Thomas and Henry, and three daughters, Elizabeth, Mabel and Jane.

Browne's relationship with his stepmother appears to have been close. She was said to have had "so solicitous a care of his health as if he had been her own child", and was so far from preferring her own children at Browne's expense that when an incident occurred which incurred Viscount Montagu's displeasure against his eldest son and heir, "she pacified her husband", and brought Browne into his father's favour again.

In 1572, Browne married Mary Dormer, a daughter of Dorothy (born Catesby) and Sir William Dormer. They had two sons, Anthony-Maria (born March 1574), who, shortly after his father's death in 1592, succeeded his grandfather as Viscount Montague, and John; and three daughters, Dorothy, who married Edmund Lee, Jane, who married Sir Francis Englefield, 1st Baronet (c. 1561 – c. 1631) and Katherine, who married John Tregonwell. In 1580, Browne was Sheriff of Surrey and of Kent, an office usually held for only one year.

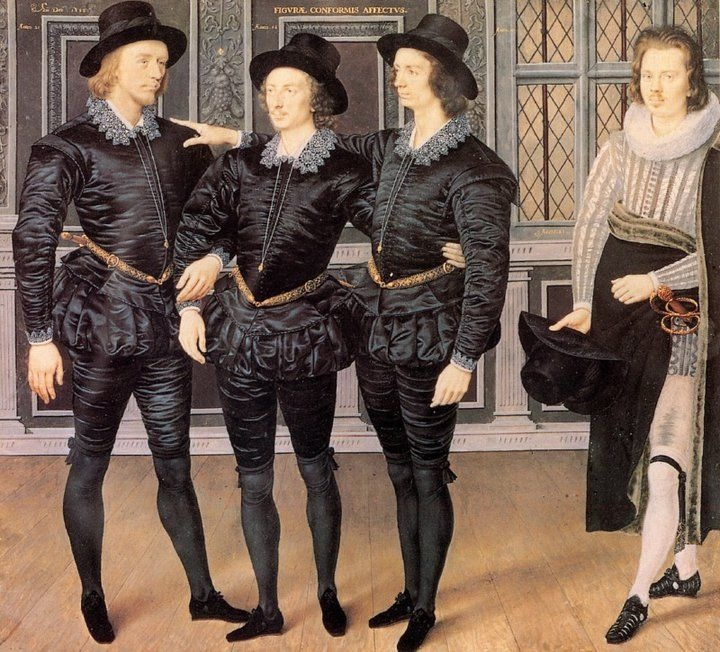
″The Brothers Anthony, John und William Brown″ by English painter Isaac Oliver, signed with monogram, inscribed and dated 1598, Burleigh House

On 19 February 1565/66, at the age of thirteen, Browne's twin sister, Mary, had married, from their father's house in London, Henry Wriothesley, 2nd Earl of Southampton. On 1 November 1573, a month after Mary had given birth to her son, Henry, the 2nd Earl wrote to Sir William More that he and his wife would stop at Loseley on their journey to London, which they were making in the company of "my brother Anthony Browne and his wife".

However, this happy state of affairs did not long continue. Around 1577 the 2nd Earl, for reasons unknown, had forbidden Mary ever to see again a certain Donsame, "a common person". When, in, 1580 it was reported to him that she had been seen at Dogmersfield with Donsame, he forever banished her his 'board and presence', forcing her to live at one of his Hampshire estates under close surveillance. The Countess defended herself with spirit in a long letter to her father, Viscount Montague, on 21 March 1580, denying adultery and accusing one of the Earl's servants, Thomas Dymock, of having been the cause of the contention between herself and her husband. The two families and their servants were drawn into the trouble between Mary Browne and her husband. An entry in the register of the Privy Council records that one of the 2nd Earl of Southampton's servants had been committed to the Marshalsea on 23 February 1580 "for certain misdemeanors by him used against Mr Anthony Brown, the eldest sonne of the Lord Montacute".

In September 1588, a contemporary reported to Bernardino de Mendoza, then Spanish Ambassador in Paris, that Browne, his young son, and two of his half brothers, George and Henry, had accompanied Viscount Montagu to Tilbury, where the Viscount had been the first nobleman to appear there with his forces at the threat of invasion by the Spanish Armada:

The first that showed his bands to the Queen, was that noble, virtuous, honorable man, the Viscount Montague, . . . who now came, though he was very sickly, and in age, with a full resolution to live and die in defense of the Queen. . . . And to show his mind agreeably thereto, he came personally himself before the Queen, with his band of horsemen, being almost two hundred; the same being led by his own sons, and with them a young child, very comely, seated on horseback, being the heir of his house, that is, the eldest son to his son and heir: a matter much noted of many, to see a grandfather, father, and son, at one time on horseback, afore a Queen for her services.

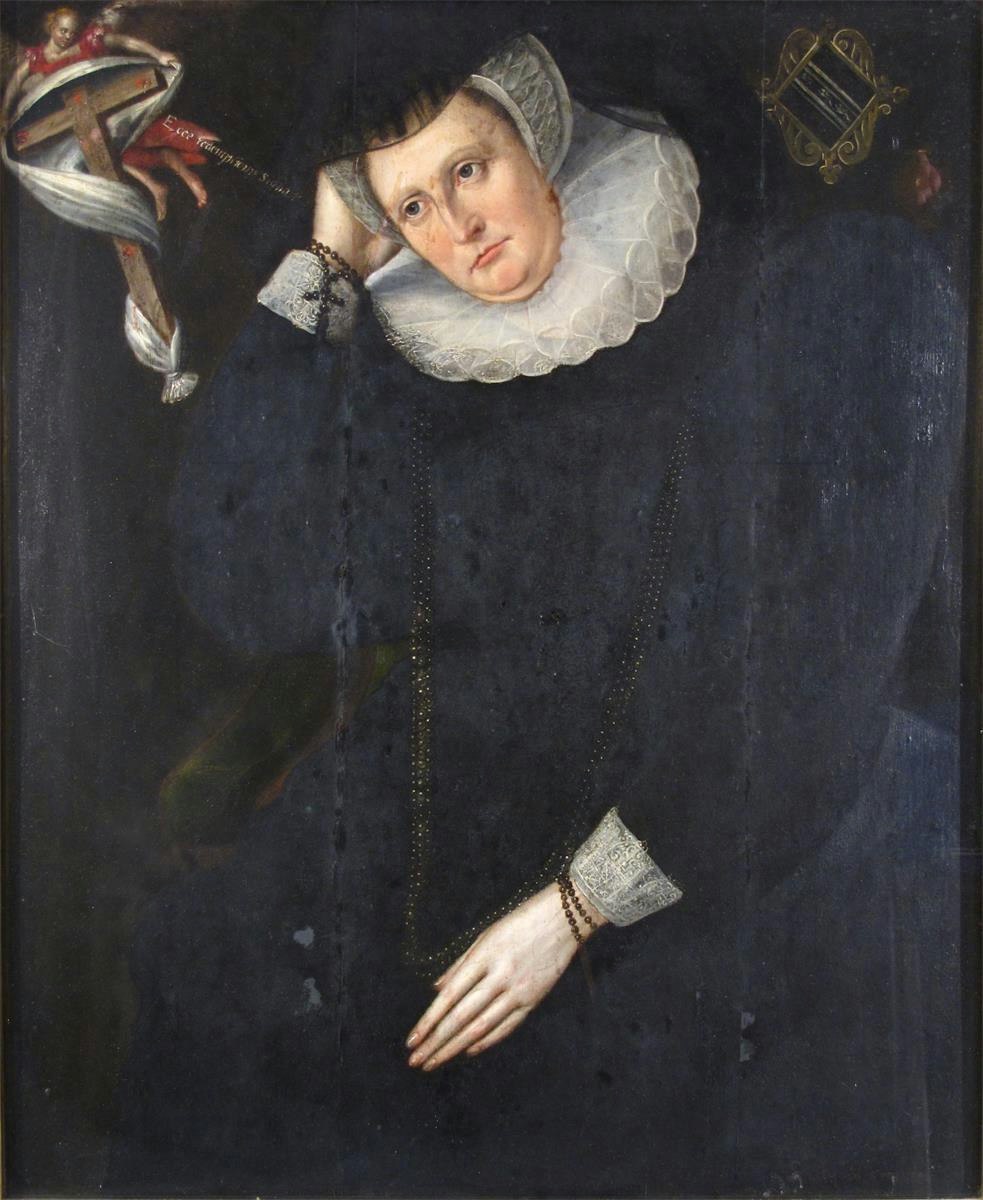
His wife or daughter: Mary Dormer/Browne or Elizabeth Dormer/Browne as widows, c. 1592 or c. 1616, oil-on-panel, (35 x 29 inches).

It is unknown if Browne was present during the Queen's 6-day visit to Cowdray in August 1591 at which his half-brother, Henry, organised the Queen's sport at hunting, and his half-brother, George, and brother-in-law, Robert Dormer, were knighted. However, on 30 December of that year Browne wrote from Horsley to Sir William More regretting he could not accept an invitation at that time, although he hoped to be able to leave his "dear friend Cornwallis' and travel before the twelve days of Christmas were up, adding, 'But I assure you I have been very weak and faint since Christmas".

In the early 1590s Browne may have been the focus of Catholics who saw him as likely to soon inherit his father's estates. Shortly after Queen Elizabeth's visit to his father's house at Cowdray, Browne was denounced by the informer Robert Hammond to Lord Burghley for associating with Catholics whom the regime considered suspect. The Jesuit John Curry was reported by Viscount Montague's chaplain, Robert Gray, to have been residing at Riverbank House in Cowdray Park, and Thomas Simpson, who later preached Browne's funeral sermon, and had been ordained a priest in the early 1580s by the Cardinal of Guise, may also have been a visitor there.

Browne died at Riverbank House at Cowdray on 29 June 1592, predeceasing his father by four months, and was buried at Midhurst, Sussex. His widow, Mary Browne (née Dormer), married, secondly, to Sir Edmund Uvedale (died 1606), and thirdly, to Sir Thomas Gerard (died 1621), the son and heir of Sir Thomas Gerard. In her will, dated 20 July 1637, Mary Gerard gave instructions for her burial at Midhurst near her first husband, Browne.
