= Jane Radcliffe =

English noblewoman

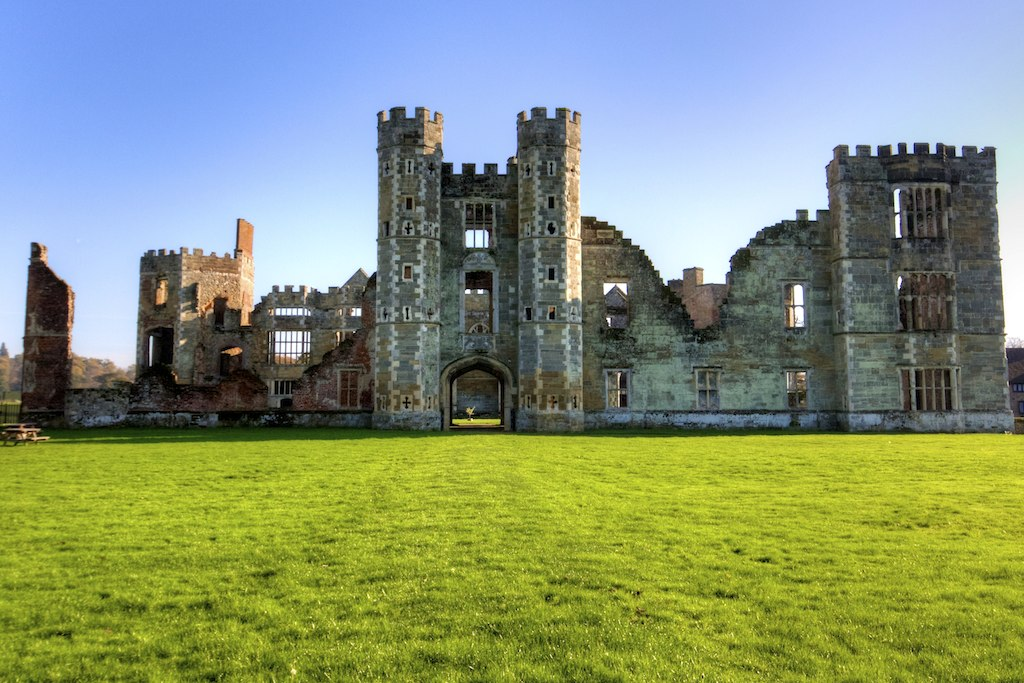
- Ruins of Cowdray House, Sussex
- Born: c.1532
- Died: 22 July 1552; Cowdray House, Sussex
- Noble family: Radcliffe (by birth); Browne (by marriage)
- Spouse: Anthony Browne, 1st Viscount Montague
- Issue: Anthony Browne; Mary Browne
- Father: Robert Radcliffe, 1st Earl of Sussex
- Mother: Margaret Stanley

Lady Jane Browne, (née Jane Radcliffe; c.1532 – 22 July 1552) was an English noblewoman.

== Family ==
Jane Radcliffe was the daughter of Robert Radcliffe, 1st Earl of Sussex, by his second wife, Margaret Stanley, daughter of Thomas Stanley, 2nd Earl of Derby, and Anne Hastings, the daughter of Edward Hastings, 2nd Baron Hastings. Jane had one sister, born of the same parents, Anne Radcliffe, who married Thomas Wharton, 2nd Baron Wharton.

By her father's other marriages Jane had several half-brothers: Henry Radcliffe, 2nd Earl of Sussex, Sir Humphrey Radcliffe (c.1508/9 – 13 August 1566), George Radcliffe, a brother who died in infancy, and Sir John Radcliffe.

== Marriage and issue ==
Jane Radcliffe married Anthony Browne, 1st Viscount Montague (d. 19 October 1592), the oldest son of Sir Anthony Browne and his first wife, Alice Gage. Jane Radcliffe Browne was not styled Viscountess Montague in life, as Anthony Browne was not created 1st Viscount Montague until September 1554, over two years after her death. Jane and Anthony Browne had 2 children, twins, a boy and a girl, born 22 July 1552:

- Anthony Browne (22 July 1552 – 29 June 1592), who married Mary Dormer, the daughter of Sir William Dormer (d.1575) by his second wife Dorothy Catesby, the daughter of Anthony Catesby, esquire. Anthony Browne predeceased his father by four months, leaving a son, Anthony, who succeeded as 2nd Viscount Montague, as well as another son, John, and three daughters, Dorothy, who married Edmund Lee, esquire, Jane, who married Sir Francis Englefield (c.1561 – 26 October 1631), 1st Baronet Englefield, and Katherine, who married a husband surnamed Throckmorton. Anthony Browne's widow, Mary Dormer, married secondly, Sir Edmund Uvedale (d. 6 April 1606), and thirdly, Sir Thomas Gerard (d. 16 February 1621), son and heir of Sir Thomas Gerard by Elizabeth, daughter and co-heiress of Sir John Port. In her will dated 20 July 1637, Mary Dormer requested that she be buried at Midhurst, Sussex, near her first husband, Anthony Browne.
- Mary Browne (22 July 1552 – 4 November 1607) married (1) Henry Wriothesley, 2nd Earl of Southampton (2) Thomas Heneage (3) William Hervey.

Unfortunately, Jane died in childbed while giving birth to the twins. She was buried at Midhurst, Sussex.

After Jane's death, Anthony Browne remarried to Magdalen Dacre (d. 8 April 1608), daughter of William Dacre, 4th Baron Dacre of Gilsland, by Elizabeth Talbot, daughter of George Talbot, 4th Earl of Shrewsbury.
