= Countess of Southampton =

Countess of Southampton is a title that may belong to either the wife of the Earl of Southampton or a countess in her own right. The title may refer to:

- Mary Wriothesley, Countess of Southampton (1552–1607), wife of Henry Wriothesley, 2nd Earl of Southampton
- Elizabeth Wriothesley, Countess of Southampton (1572–1655), wife of Henry Wriothesley, 3rd Earl of Southampton
- Barbara Palmer, 1st Duchess of Cleveland (1640–1709), countess in her own right
