= Mary Browne (courtier) =

English aristocrat and courtier

Mary Browne (1593–1692) was an English aristocrat.

She was a daughter of Anthony-Maria Browne, 2nd Viscount Montagu and Jane Sackville, a daughter of Thomas Sackville, 1st Earl of Dorset.

In 1597 her father, a Catholic, wrote an "Instruction to my daughter Marie Browne, in the principall groundes, and moste necessarie pointes of the Catholique faithe", possibly directing her towards the idea of becoming a nun.

She married firstly, William Paulet (d. 1621), Lord St John, eldest son of William Paulet, 4th Marquess of Winchester.

The letter writer John Chamberlain described the end of her first marriage in 1616. He heard that she hoped to get the marriage annulled because of her husband's impotence.

Chamberlain thought that she would renounce the Catholic faith, and might join the household of Anne of Denmark as a replacement for the queen's favourite Jean Drummond, Countess of Roxburghe.

She attended the funeral of Anne of Denmark in 1619, listed as the Baroness St John.

Her second husband was William Arundell (d. 1653) of Horningsham, Wiltshire, the second son of Thomas Arundell, 1st Baron Arundell of Wardour, and Mary Wriothesley, the daughter of Henry Wriothesley, 2nd Earl of Southampton. His sister-in-law Lady Blanche Arundell was a prominent member of the queen's household.

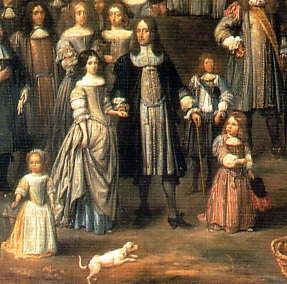
Henry Tichborne and family, c. 1670, Gillis van Tilborgh

After her second marriage, Mary continued to be known as "Lady St John". Her children included:

- Charles Arundell (1621 – 28 October 1649), who married Mary Talbot, a daughter of John Talbot, 10th Earl of Shrewsbury
- Mary Arundell (1622 – 1698), who married Sir Henry Tichborne
- Katherine Arundell (1625 – 4 Mar 1641)
- Mark Arundell (b. 1628)

She died on 13 November 1692 aged 99.
