= Henry Wriothesley =

Henry Wriothesley (pronounced Risley) may refer to:

- Henry Wriothesley, 2nd Earl of Southampton (1545–1581)
- Henry Wriothesley, 3rd Earl of Southampton (1573–1624), patron of William Shakespeare
