= Anthony Browne, 1st Viscount Montagu =

English peer

The Right Honourable The Viscount Montagu KB PC
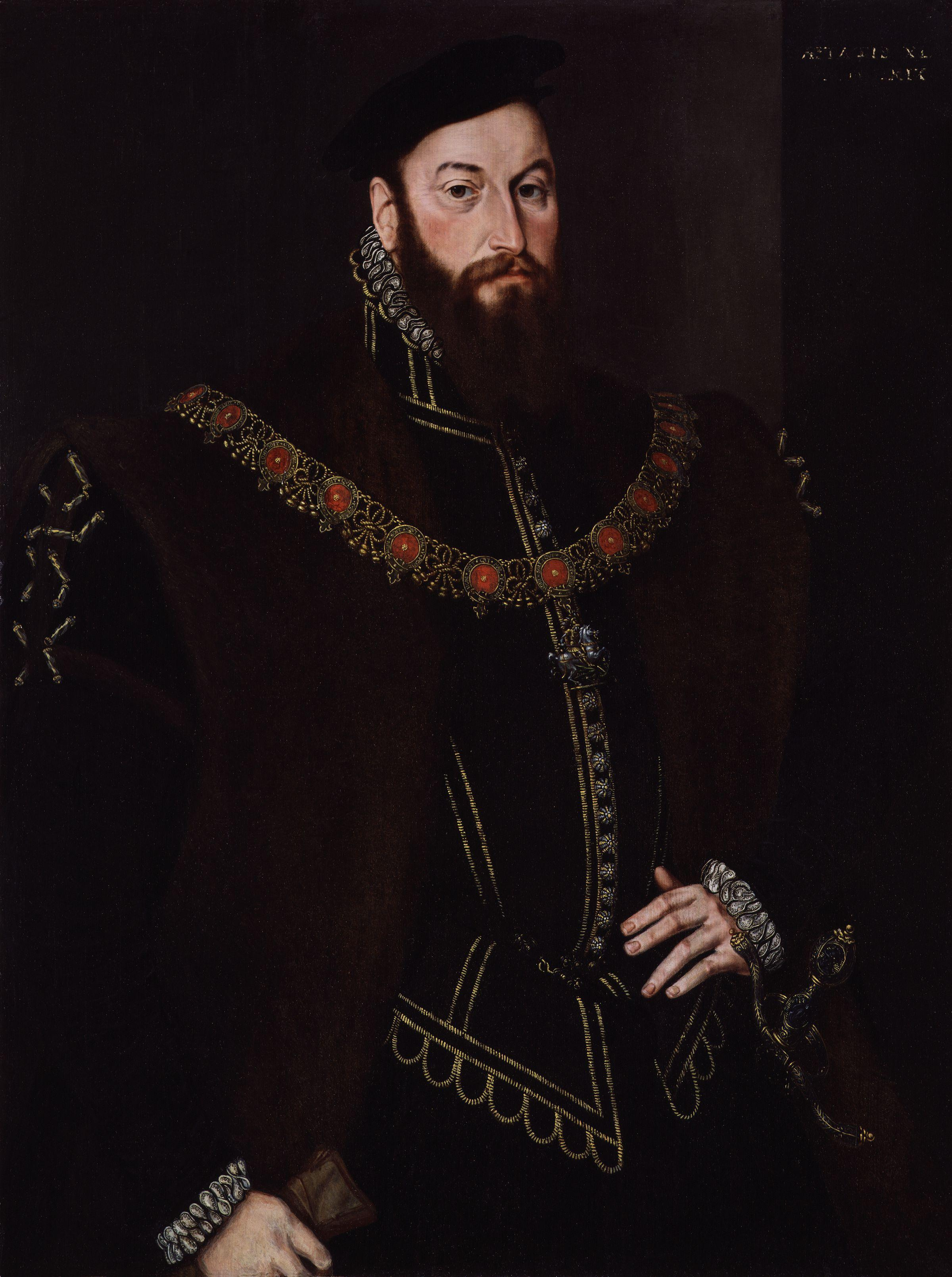
- Anthony Browne, 1st Viscount Montague, by Hans Eworth
- Born: 29 November 1528
- Died: 19 October 1592 (aged 63); West Horsley, Surrey
- Noble family: Browne
- Spouses: Jane Radcliffe; Magdalen Dacre
- Issue: Anthony Browne; Mary Browne; Sir George Browne; Thomas Browne; Henry Browne; Elizabeth Browne; Mabel Browne; Jane Browne
- Father: Sir Anthony Browne
- Mother: Alice Gage

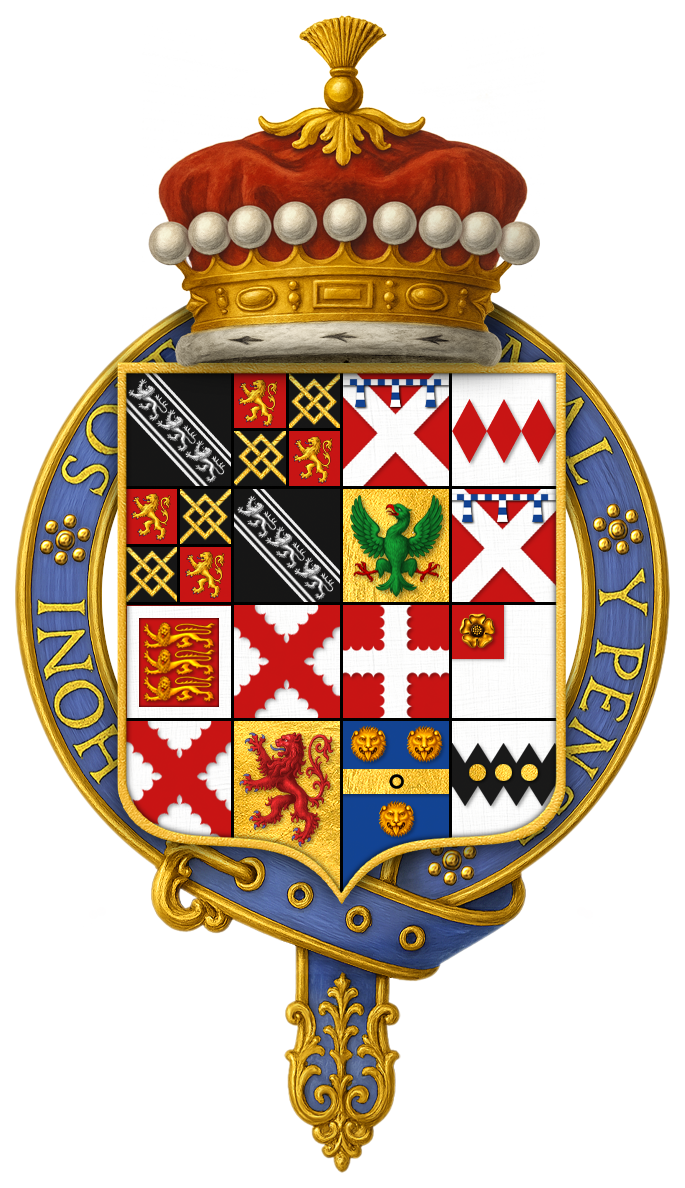
Quartered arms of Sir Anthony Browne, 1st Viscount Montagu, KG

Anthony Browne, 1st Viscount Montagu, KB, PC (29 November 1528 – 19 October 1592) was an English peer during the Tudor period. He was a staunch Roman Catholic, but unswervingly loyal to the Crown. Montagu was employed on diplomatic missions to the Pope in Rome and to Spain, and was 'highly esteemed for his prudence and wisdom' by Queen Elizabeth. In spite of his bold opposition to the Acts of Supremacy and Allegiance (1559 and 1562), which threatened the religious activities of the Roman Catholics, he never lost Queen Elizabeth's favour. He was one of the commissioners who tried Mary, Queen of Scots in 1587. In 1571 he was implicated in the Ridolfi Plot along with two of his Dacre brothers-in-law.

== Biography ==
Anthony Browne was the eldest of the six sons of Sir Anthony Browne by his first wife, Alice Gage (d. 31 March 1540/1), the daughter of Sir John Gage of Firle, Sussex.

Browne was elected a member of parliament for Guildford in 1545, and named standard-bearer jointly with his father in 1546. Before 16 February 1547 he was appointed as an equerry in the royal stables. He was among the forty Knights of the Bath created at the coronation of King Edward VI on 20 February 1547.

According to Elzinga, Browne's conservative views, and particularly his support for Henry VIII's daughter, Princess Mary, antagonised the Edwardian regime, but he was nonetheless re-elected for Guildford in 1547, and at his father's death on 28 April 1548 was allowed to purchase his wardship for £333 6s 8d, although he was replaced as standard-bearer, as being too young for the position. He inherited from his father an estate worth at least £1,177 12s 2d per annum. On reaching the age of majority he was restored to the position of standard-bearer, and had licence to enter on his lands on 4 May 1550.

He was Sheriff of Surrey and Sussex from 1552 to 1553, and returned as MP for Petersfield, Hampshire, in March 1553, although nothing further is known of his role in the House of Commons. He appears to have taken no active part in the succession crisis which followed the death of Edward VI, despite receiving a letter from the Privy Council on 8 July 1553 and a letter from Lady Jane Grey herself two days later.

After Queen Mary's accession to the throne in July 1553 Browne was appointed to several positions in the royal household. From October 1553 he was Keeper of Guildford Park. In April 1554 he was appointed Master of the Horse to Queen Mary's consort, Philip II of Spain, for which he was granted an annuity of £200. From June 1554 he was steward and keeper of the chase at Hampton Court Palace. However, in early September 1554 King Philip replaced the English appointees in his household with Spaniards, and Browne lost his position as Philip's Master of Horse. There was much indignation at Court at Philip's graceless behaviour. However Browne continued to hold civic offices. In April 1554 he was elected knight of the shire for Surrey, and in the same year was a justice of the peace for Surrey and Sussex.

At Queen Mary's marriage to King Philip at Winchester Cathedral on 25 July 1554, Browne's future (second) wife, Magdalen Dacre, walked in the bridal procession, and Browne was elevated to the peerage as Viscount Montagu. He took his seat in the House of Lords on 12 November, and is said to have attended regularly.

From 16 February to 24 August 1555 Montagu travelled to Rome as one of the English ambassadors sent to treat with Pope Julius III for the restoration of Catholicism in England. He was installed as a Knight of the Garter on 17 October 1555. In 1557 he served under William Herbert, 1st Earl of Pembroke, as lieutenant-general of the English forces in Picardy at the siege of St Quentin. On 28 April 1557 he was appointed to the Privy Council. He was one of fifteen executors of Queen Mary's will, and one of the chief mourners at her funeral.

When Queen Elizabeth came to the throne in November 1558, Montagu was replaced on the Privy Council, and in the Parliament of 1559 spoke against the new regime's measures for religious reform, including bills for uniformity in religion, for the re-establishment of the royal supremacy, and for the dissolution of the religious houses which had been restored during Queen Mary's reign (Montagu himself had founded two chantries, one at Battle Abbey, and one at Midhurst). In 1563 he again spoke against a bill involving the oath of supremacy. Despite his opposition to the regime's religious reforms, Montagu retained Queen Elizabeth's favour through his prudence and loyalty. He was sent on diplomatic missions to Spain in 1560 and 1565.

According to Elzinga, Montagu had landed income in the 1560s of between £2000 and £3000 a year, and as one of the wealthiest peers in Sussex was reappointed as joint Lord Lieutenant of Sussex during the Northern Rebellion in 1569. However, in November both Montagu and his son-in-law, Henry Wriothesley, 2nd Earl of Southampton, were implicated in the rebellion. In a letter dated 1 December 1569 the Spanish ambassador, Guerau de Spes, wrote to the Duke of Alba that both Montagu and Southampton 'have sent to me for advice as to whether they should take up arms or go over to your Excellency'. According to Akrigg, Montagu and Southampton set sail for Flanders, but were driven back by contrary winds. Although they were ordered to come immediately to court to explain their actions, to all appearances things were smoothed over, and neither Montagu nor his son-in-law was punished for his involvement.

In the following year Montagu's son-in-law was in more serious trouble, although Montagu himself appears to have escaped unscathed. After Pope Pius V's excommunication of the Queen, English Catholics were required to choose between loyalty to religion and loyalty to the sovereign. Southampton sought counsel from John Lesley, Bishop of Ross, at a secret meeting in the marshes of Lambeth, where they were intercepted by the watch, and in consequence, on 18 June 1570 the Privy Council ordered Southampton's arrest and confined him to the house of Henry Beecher, Sheriff of London. On 15 July he was placed in the custody of Sir William More at Loseley, where More was under instructions to induce Southampton to take part in Protestant devotions in the household. After doing so, Southampton was released in November.

A year later, in September 1571, under questioning concerning the Ridolfi plot, the Bishop of Ross incriminated Southampton by revealing the entire story of their meeting in Lambeth marsh. Southampton was arrested at the end of October and confined to the Tower for 18 months. He was finally released on 1 May 1573, and again placed in the custody of Sir William More at Loseley. On 14 July he was permitted to live with Montagu at Cowdray House, although his liberty was still restricted, and on 6 October 1573 Southampton wrote elatedly to Sir William More from Cowdray House to announce the birth of his son, Henry Wriothesley, 3rd Earl of Southampton.

In the year prior to Southampton's death, Montagu's relationship with his son-in-law was severely strained. In about 1577 Southampton, for reasons unknown, had forbidden his wife ever to see again a certain Donsame, 'a common person'. When in 1580 it was reported to him that she had been seen at Dogmersfield with Donsame, he forever banished her from his 'board and presence', forcing her to live at one of his Hampshire estates under close surveillance. The Countess defended herself with spirit in a long letter to her father on 21 March 1580, denying adultery and accusing one of the Earl's servants, Thomas Dymock, of having been the cause of the contention between herself and her husband. An indication of the rift between Montagu and Southampton over the latter's treatment of his wife can be found in an entry in the register of the Privy Council recording that one of Southampton's servants had been committed to the Marshalsea on 23 February 1580 'for certain misdemeanours by him used against Mr Anthony Brown, the eldest sonne of the Lord Montacute'.

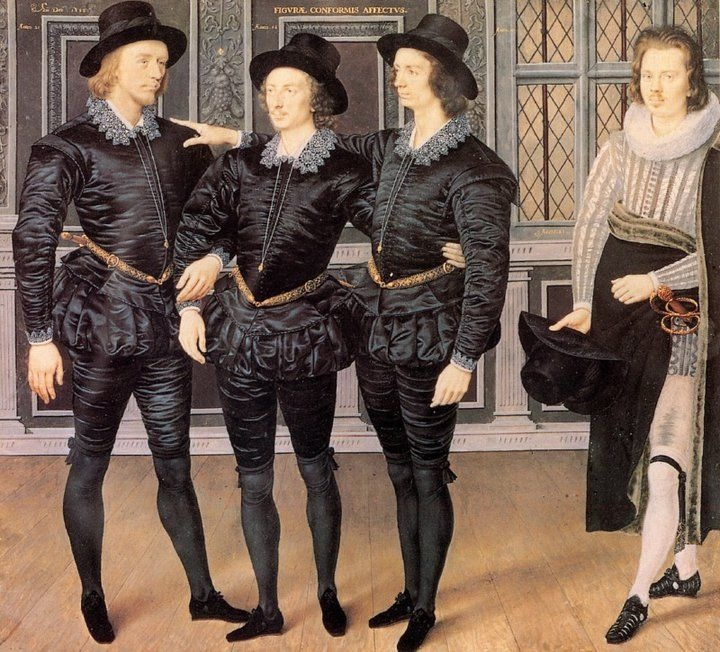
The Three Brothers Browne, by English painter Isaac Oliver, 1598. L to R: His grandsons John Browne, Anthony Maria Browne, William Browne, Burghley House Collections.

When war broke out with Spain in 1585, Montagu was removed from his position as Lord Lieutenant. However, the following year he proved his loyalty to the Queen as one of the peers who tried Mary, Queen of Scots, and in 1588 aided in the defence against the Spanish Armada, leading a troop of horsemen with his son and grandson. In August 1591 the queen honoured Montagu by spending six days at Cowdray House. He entertained her lavishly, and in reward she conferred knighthoods on Montagu's second son, George Browne, and Montagu's son-in-law, Robert Dormer, 1st Baron Dormer.

In 1590 Montagu and his daughter Mary were negotiating with Lord Burghley for a marriage between Mary's son, Henry Wriothesley, 3rd Earl of Southampton, and Lord Burghley's eldest granddaughter, Elizabeth de Vere, daughter of Burghley's daughter, Anne Cecil, and Edward de Vere, 17th Earl of Oxford. However, the match was not to Southampton's liking, and in a letter written in November 1594, about six weeks after Southampton had turned 21, the Jesuit Henry Garnet reported the rumour that 'The young Erle of Southampton refusing the Lady Veere payeth £5000 of present payment'.

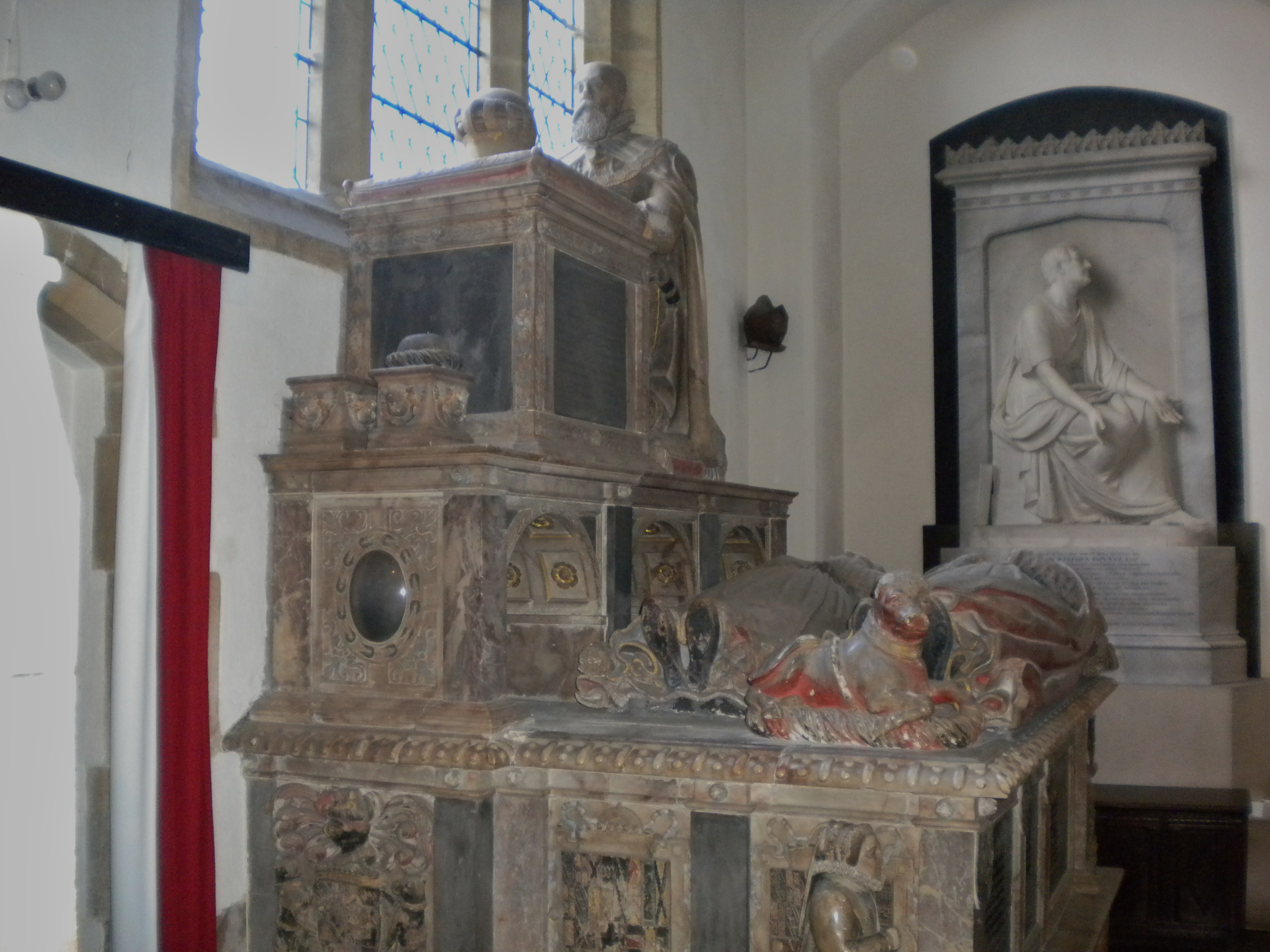
Montagu's monument in St Mary's parish church, Easebourne, Sussex

Montagu died at his manor house in West Horsley, Surrey, on 19 October 1592 of a lingering illness, and was buried at Midhurst in Sussex on 6 December. His tomb of marble and alabaster, surmounted by a kneeling effigy of himself and recumbent effigies of his two wives, so closely resembles the Southampton monument at Titchfield as to be, according to Elzinga, 'a testament to the closeness between Montague and Southampton'.

In 1851 Montagu's monument was moved from Midhurst to St Mary's parish church, Easebourne, Sussex.

== Family ==
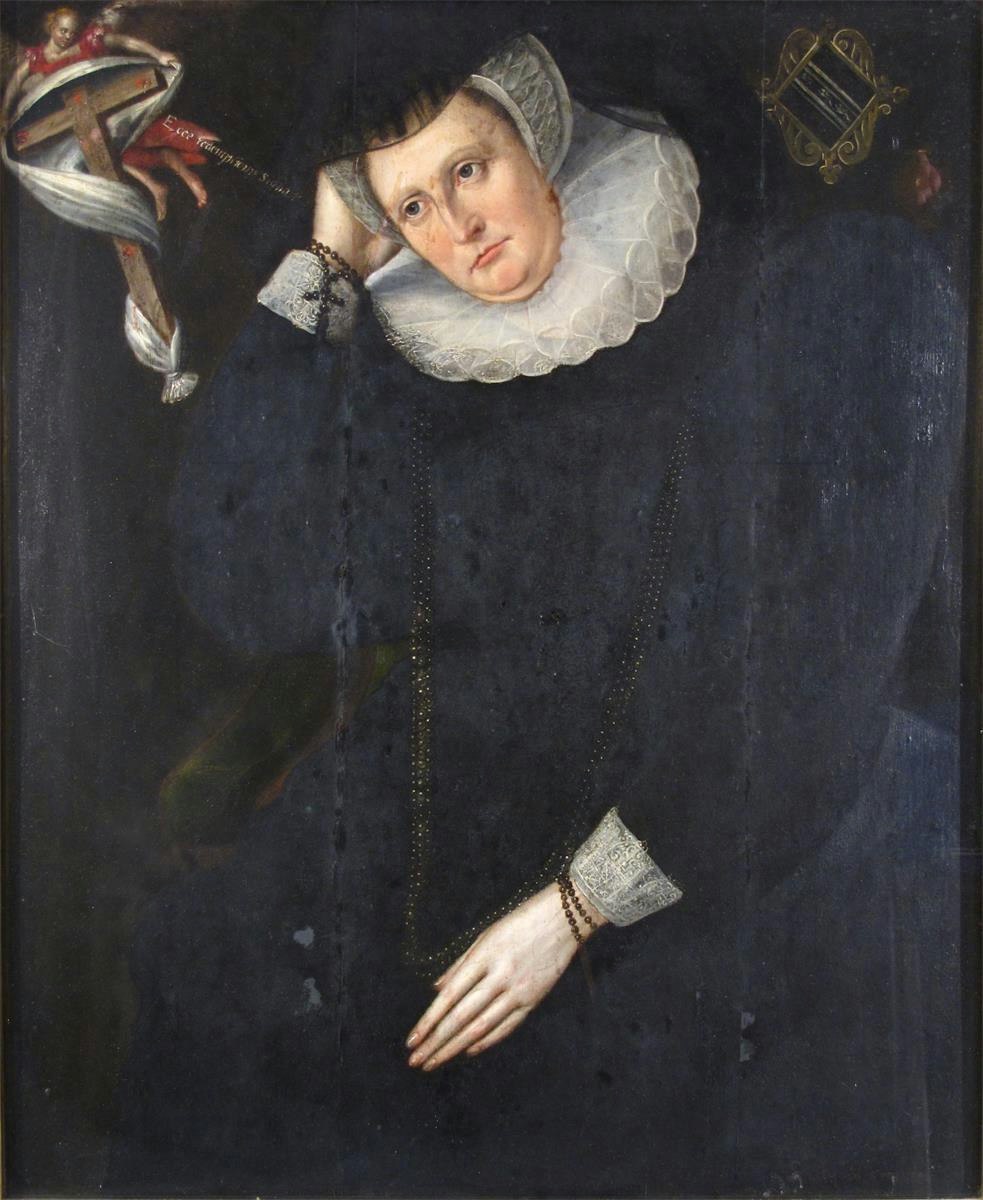
Mary Dormer/Browne or Elizabeth Dormer/Browne as widows, c. 1592 or c. 1616, oil-on-panel (35 × 29 inches)

Anthony Browne married, firstly, Jane Radcliffe, daughter of Robert Radcliffe, 1st Earl of Sussex, by whom he had twin children, a son and a daughter:

- Anthony Browne (22 July 1552 – 29 June 1592), who married Mary Dormer, the daughter of Sir William Dormer. Anthony Browne predeceased his father by four months, therefore never became Viscount; the title passed instead to his son, Anthony-Maria Browne.
- Mary Browne, who married, firstly, Henry Wriothesley, 2nd Earl of Southampton, then married, secondly, Sir Thomas Heneage, and, thirdly, William Hervey, 1st Baron Hervey.

Jane died in childbirth on 22 July 1552 after giving birth to twins; Montagu married, before 10 December 1558, Magdalen Dacre (d. 8 April 1608), daughter of William Dacre, 3rd Baron Dacre of Gilsland, by Elizabeth Talbot, daughter of George Talbot, 4th Earl of Shrewsbury, by whom he had three sons and three daughters:

- Sir George Browne (d. April 1615) married Eleanor Bridges and Mary Tyrwhitt, both by whom he had issue.
- Sir Henry Browne, who married Mary Hungate and then Anne Catesby.
- Thomas Browne.
- Elizabeth Browne (d. 1631), who married Robert Dormer, 1st Baron Dormer, the son of Sir William Dormer by his second wife, Dorothy Catesby (d.1613).
- Mabel Browne, who married Sir Henry Capel.
- Jane Browne, who married Sir Francis Lacon.

== Notes ==
Political offices
Preceded by The Lord Lumley	Lord Lieutenant of Sussex jointly with The Lord De La Warr; The Lord Buckhurst; 1570–1585	Succeeded by The Lord Howard of Effingham
Peerage of England
New creation	Viscount Montagu; 1554–1592	Succeeded by Anthony-Maria Browne
