= Anthony-Maria Browne, 2nd Viscount Montagu =

English peer

Anthony-Maria Browne
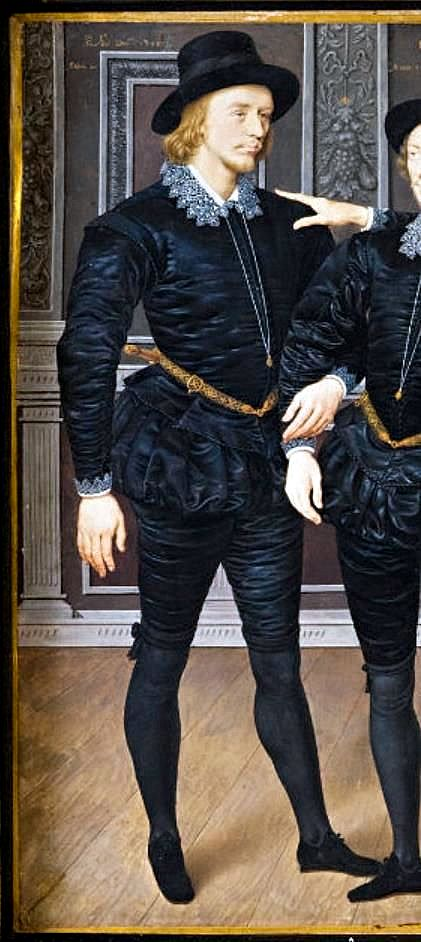
- Anthony-Maria Browne, 2nd Viscount Montagu from a painting by Isaac Oliver (1598)
- Born: 1574
- Died: 23 October 1629 (aged 54–55)
- Buried: Midhurst, Sussex
- Noble family: Browne
- Spouse: Jane Sackville
- Issue: Francis Browne; Anthony Browne; Francis Browne, 3rd Viscount Montagu; Mary Browne; Katherine Browne; Mary Browne (again); Frances Browne; Anne Browne; Lucy Browne
- Father: Anthony Browne
- Mother: Mary Dormer

Anthony-Maria Browne (1574 – 23 October 1629) was an English peer during the Tudor and Stuart period.

He was born in 1574, the son of Anthony Browne (22 July 1552 – 29 June 1592), eldest son of Anthony Browne, 1st Viscount Montagu, and Mary Dormer. He became the Second Viscount Montagu at the age of 18 on the death of his grandfather in 1592, from whom he inherited an estate worth between £3600 and £5400 per annum.

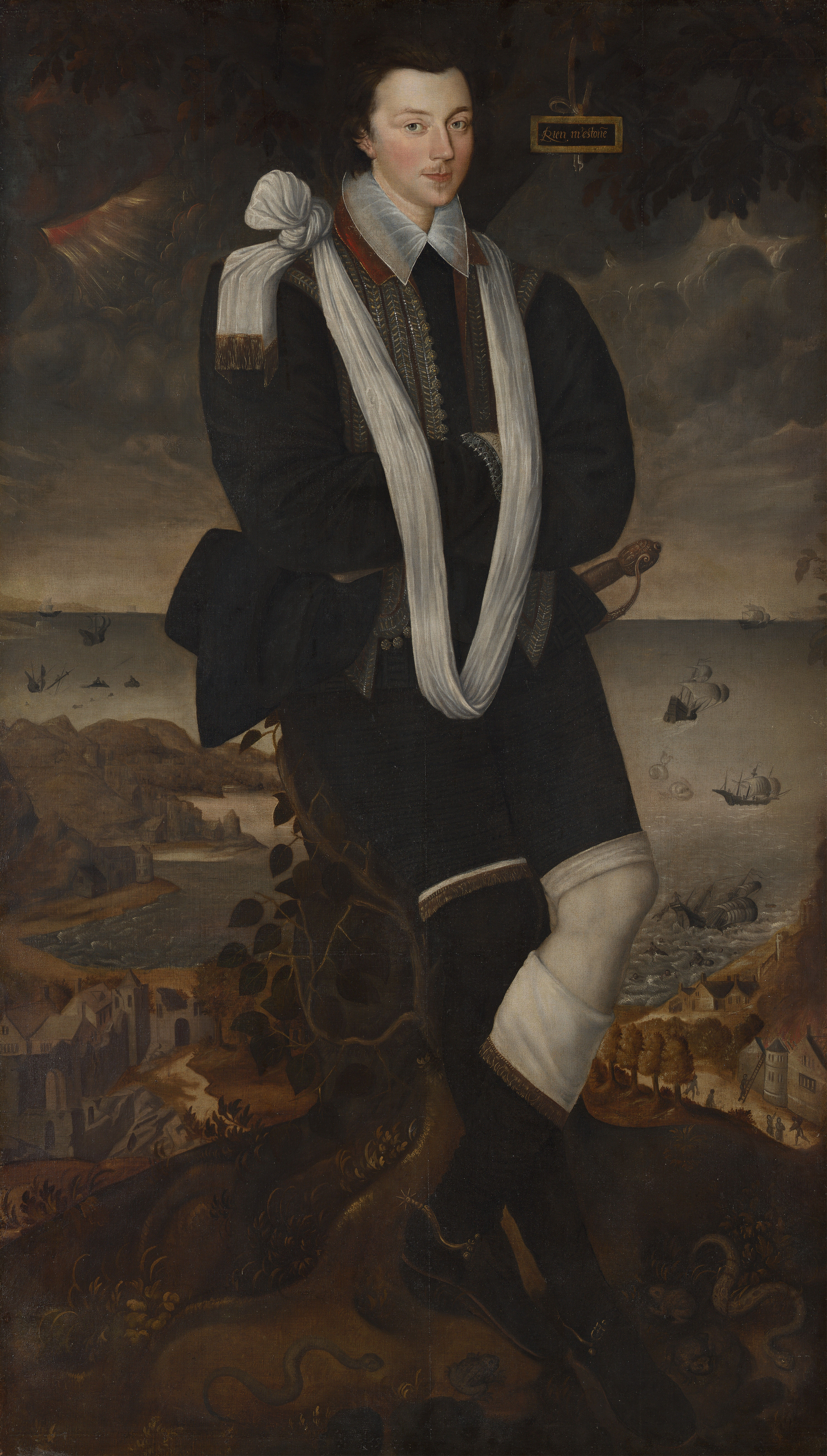
Portrait of Anthony Maria Browne, 2nd Viscount Montagu by Robert Peake the Elder.

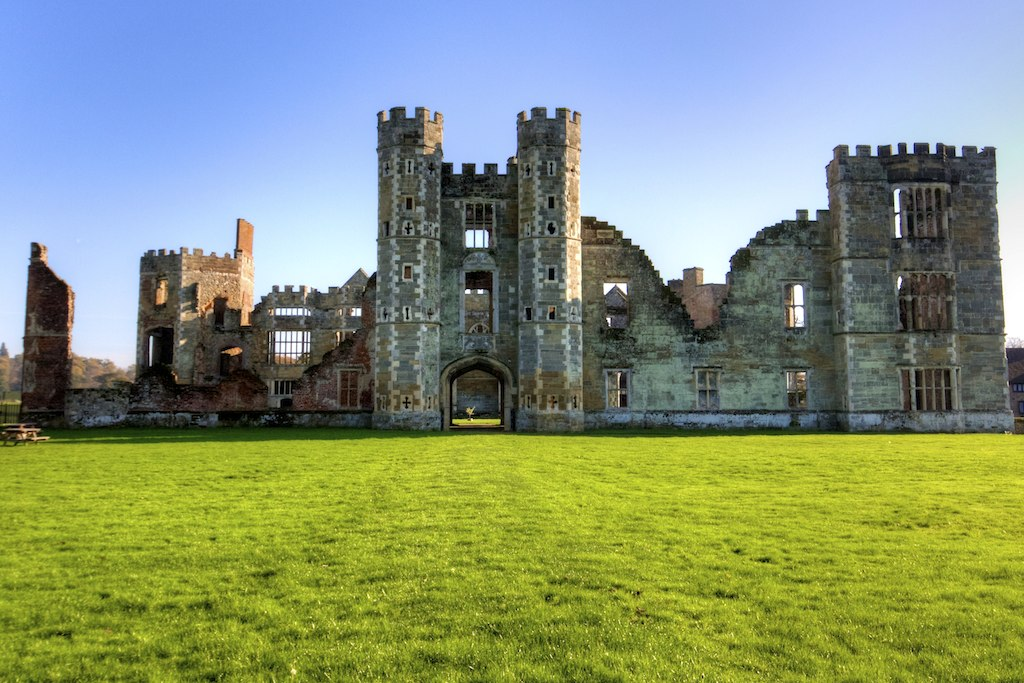
Ruins of Cowdray House

In 1591 Browne married Jane Sackville, daughter of Thomas Sackville, 1st Earl of Dorset, and by her had issue:

- Francis Browne (died young).
- Anthony Browne (died young).
- Francis Browne, 3rd Viscount Montague, who married Elizabeth Somerset, the daughter of Henry Somerset, 1st Marquess of Worcester.
- Mary Browne, who married firstly, William Paulet (d.1621), Lord St. John, eldest son of William Paulet, 4th Marquess of Winchester, and secondly, William Arundell, esquire, of Horningsham, Wiltshire, second son of Thomas Arundell, 1st Baron Arundell of Wardour, and Mary Wriothesley, the daughter of Henry Wriothesley, 2nd Earl of Southampton, by Mary Browne, daughter of Anthony Browne, 1st Viscount Montague.
- Catherine Browne, who married William Tyrwhit.
- Mary Browne (d. January 1685), who married Robert Petre, 3rd Baron Petre (d. October 1638).
- Frances Browne, who married John Blomer.
- Anne Browne, who became a nun.
- Lucy Browne, who became a nun.

Anthony-Maria Browne was arrested in connection with the Gunpowder Plot and spent about a year in the Tower of London.

In 1595, he wrote a book on how to manage a nobleman's household entitled "A Booke of Orders and Rules".

He died on 23 October 1629 and is buried in Midhurst Church.

== Footnotes ==
Peerage of England
Preceded by Anthony Browne	Viscount Montagu; 1592–1629	Succeeded by Francis Browne
