= Mary Wriothesley, Countess of Southampton =

English noblewoman (1552–1607)

Mary Wriothesley
- Countess of Southampton
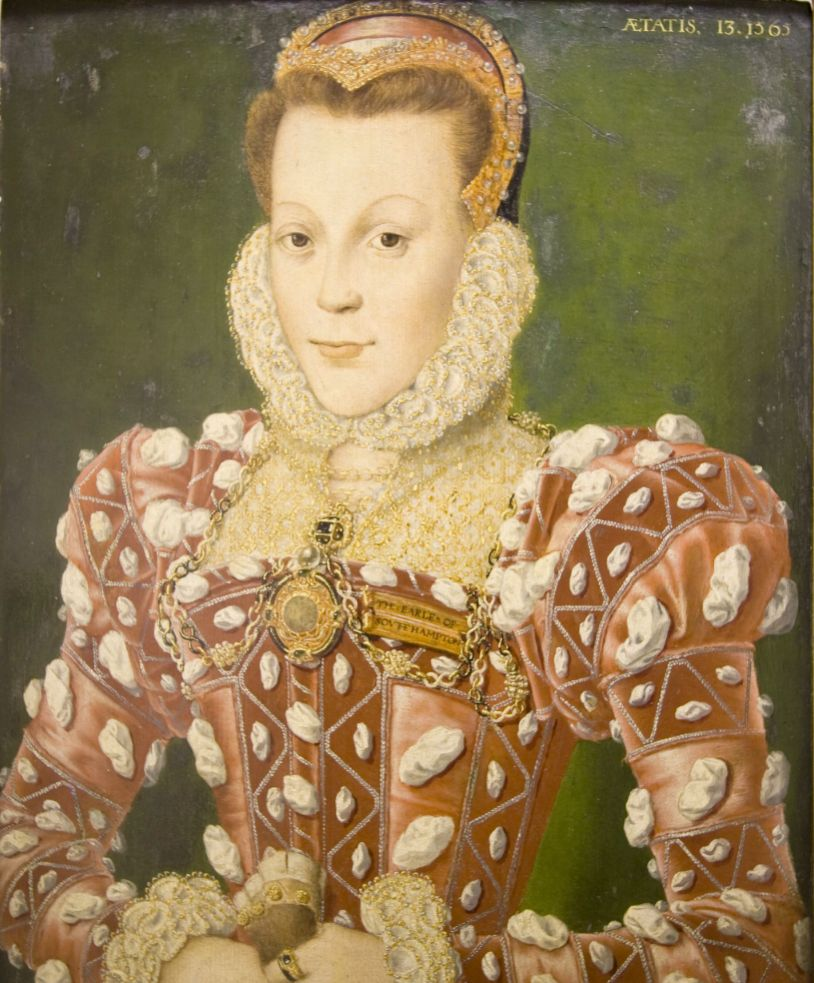
- Portrait by Hans Eworth, 1565
- Born: Mary Browne; 22 July 1552
- Died: October/November 1607 (aged 55)
- Noble family: Browne
- Spouses: Henry Wriothesley, 2nd Earl of Southampton; Thomas Heneage; William Hervey, 1st Baron Hervey
- Issue: Henry Wriothesley, 3rd Earl of Southampton; Jane; Mary
- Father: Anthony Browne, 1st Viscount Montagu
- Mother: Jane Radcliffe

Mary Wriothesley, Countess of Southampton (22 July 1552 – October/November 1607), previously Mary Browne, became the wife of Henry Wriothesley, 2nd Earl of Southampton, at the age of thirteen and the mother of Henry Wriothesley, 3rd Earl of Southampton. Widowed in 1581, she was Dowager Countess of Southampton until 1595, when for a few months until his death she was married to the courtier Sir Thomas Heneage. In 1598 she married lastly Sir William Hervey.

== Life ==
The daughter of Anthony Browne, 1st Viscount Montagu, by his first marriage to Lady Jane Radcliffe, a daughter of Robert Radcliffe, 1st Earl of Sussex, and Lady Margaret Stanley. Mary Browne had a twin brother, Anthony, but they lost their mother in the childbirth. Before 10 December 1558 Montagu married Magdalen Dacre, by whom he had three sons, Sir George, Thomas and Henry, and three daughters, Elizabeth, Mabel and Jane.

On 19 February 1565/66 at the age of thirteen Mary Browne married, at her father's house in London, Henry Wriothesley, 2nd Earl of Southampton, a royal ward who himself was aged only twenty, the son of Jane Cheney and the deceased 1st Earl of Southampton. Later in 1566 Southampton reached the age of twenty-one, but he did not gain control of his estates until 7 February 1568. He then found himself with six residences and an income of between £2,000 and £3,000, so "lived in a grand way, maintaining a large and lavish household". However, Mary's life with Southampton was troubled by his political difficulties stemming from his "fervent Catholicism".

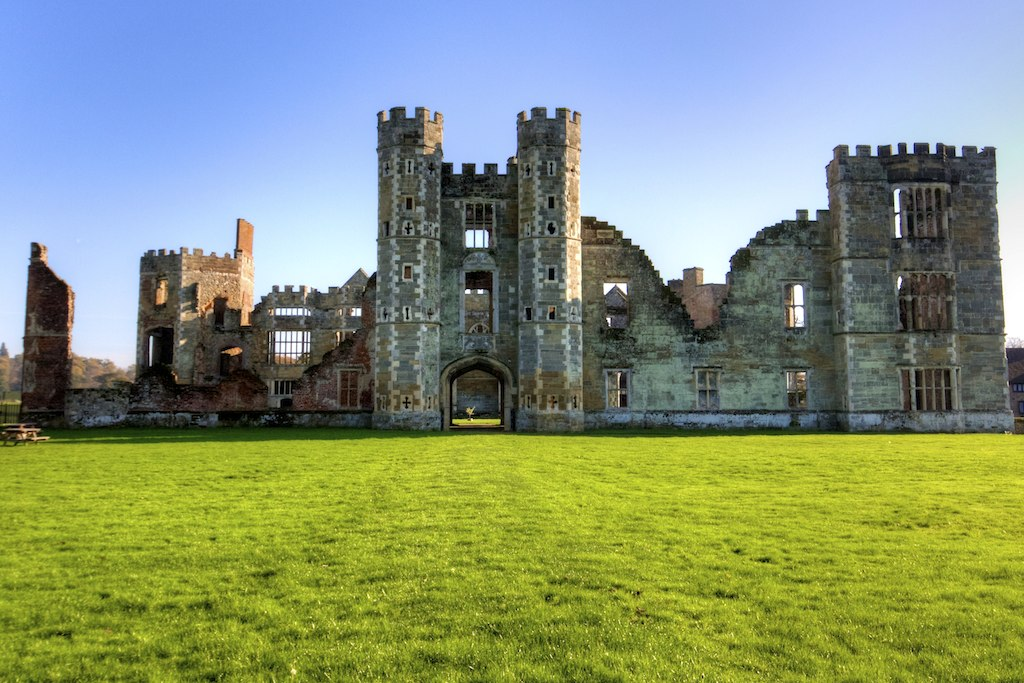
Ruins of Cowdray House, Mary Browne's birthplace

By Southampton Mary had an only son, Henry Wriothesley, 3rd Earl of Southampton, and two daughters, Jane, who died before 1573, and Mary, who married Thomas Arundell, 1st Baron Arundell of Wardour. On 6 October 1573 Southampton wrote with great happiness to his friend Sir William More to give news of the birth of his son. The next six years were a period of stability, with the Queen granting Southampton small signs of favour. Following his mother's death in 1574 he began to build a great new country house at Dogmersfield. Mary and Southampton continued on affectionate terms until about 1577, but by then he had forbidden her to see a man named Donsame, described as "a common person", and after that development the couple's relationship worsened. In 1580, Southampton learned that Mary had been seen at Dogmersfield with Donsame and he put her away from him, after which she was forced to live under surveillance on one of her husband's Hampshire estates. Mary denied adultery and accused a servant, Thomas Dymock, of having caused the suspicion between herself and her husband. There then arose a dispute between Southampton and his father-in-law over his treatment of his wife, which years later Robert Persons blamed on the Roman Catholic conspirator Charles Paget. Lord Montagu wrote to Mary, asking his daughter to explain herself, and Mary sent him a copy of a letter she had sent Southampton by their son, which her husband had refused to read. She said to her father in a postscript

That yowr Lordship shalbe witnes of my desier to wyn my Lorde by all such meanes as resteth in me, I have sent yowe what I sent him by my little boye. Butt his harte was too greate to bestowe the reading of it, coming from me. Yett will I do my parte so longe as I am with him, but good my Lorde, procure so soone as conveniently yowe may, some end to my miserie for I am tyred with this life.

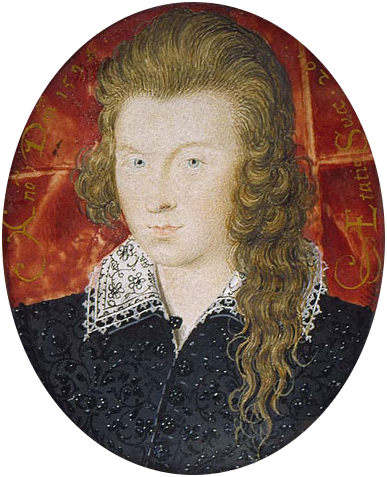
Mary's son Southampton aged twenty-one

Mary did not see her son again until after his father died the following year, on 4 October 1581, leaving an estate worth £1097 a year, when she became Dowager Countess of Southampton. In his Will, Southampton named Thomas Dymock and Charles Paget as executors, and Mary contested this with some success, supported by the Earl of Leicester. By 11 December 1581 there was a settlement between her and the executors under which Dymock was still to receive generous bequests but had to relinquish the administration of the estate to Edward Gage.

Queen Elizabeth sold the wardship and custody of Mary's young son to Lord Howard of Effingham for £1,000. Howard then transferred the custody to Lord Burghley, but kept control of the young peer's estates, and as a result late in 1581 or early in 1582 the new Earl of Southampton, then aged eight, came to live at Cecil House in the Strand. This did not prevent Henry from spending some time with his mother, who on 14 October 1590 wrote to Burghley to thank him for entrusting her son to her for a long time.

For almost fourteen years the Dowager Countess remained a widow. On 2 May 1594, she married as his second wife the courtier Sir Thomas Heneage, Vice-Chamberlain of the Queen's Household, but Heneage lived barely another five months. Having drawn in advance substantial sums in connection with his office, he died owing the crown £12,000. In 1596, his widow, who was also his executrix, had already made two large payments, but the Queen's auditors advised her that there was still more than £7,800 owing. According to Akrigg, in order to repay this substantial debt Mary probably had to draw on her own resources. Between 5 November 1598 and 31 January 1598/99, Mary Heneage married thirdly Sir William Hervey (died 1642), and lived almost another nine years, dying in October or November 1607. She left a will proved on 14 November in which she gave instructions for her burial at Titchfield "as near as may be unto the body of my honorable and dearlie beloved Lord and husband Henrie late Earle of Southampton". On 17 November 1607 Thomas Howard, 2nd Earl of Arundel, wrote to the Earl of Shrewsbury that "Old Southampton... is dead, and hath left the best of her stuff to her son, and the greatest part to her husband, the most of which I think will be sold and dispersed into the hands of many men".
