= Earl of Southampton =

English noble title

Arms of FitzWilliam, Earl of Southampton: Lozengy argent and gules

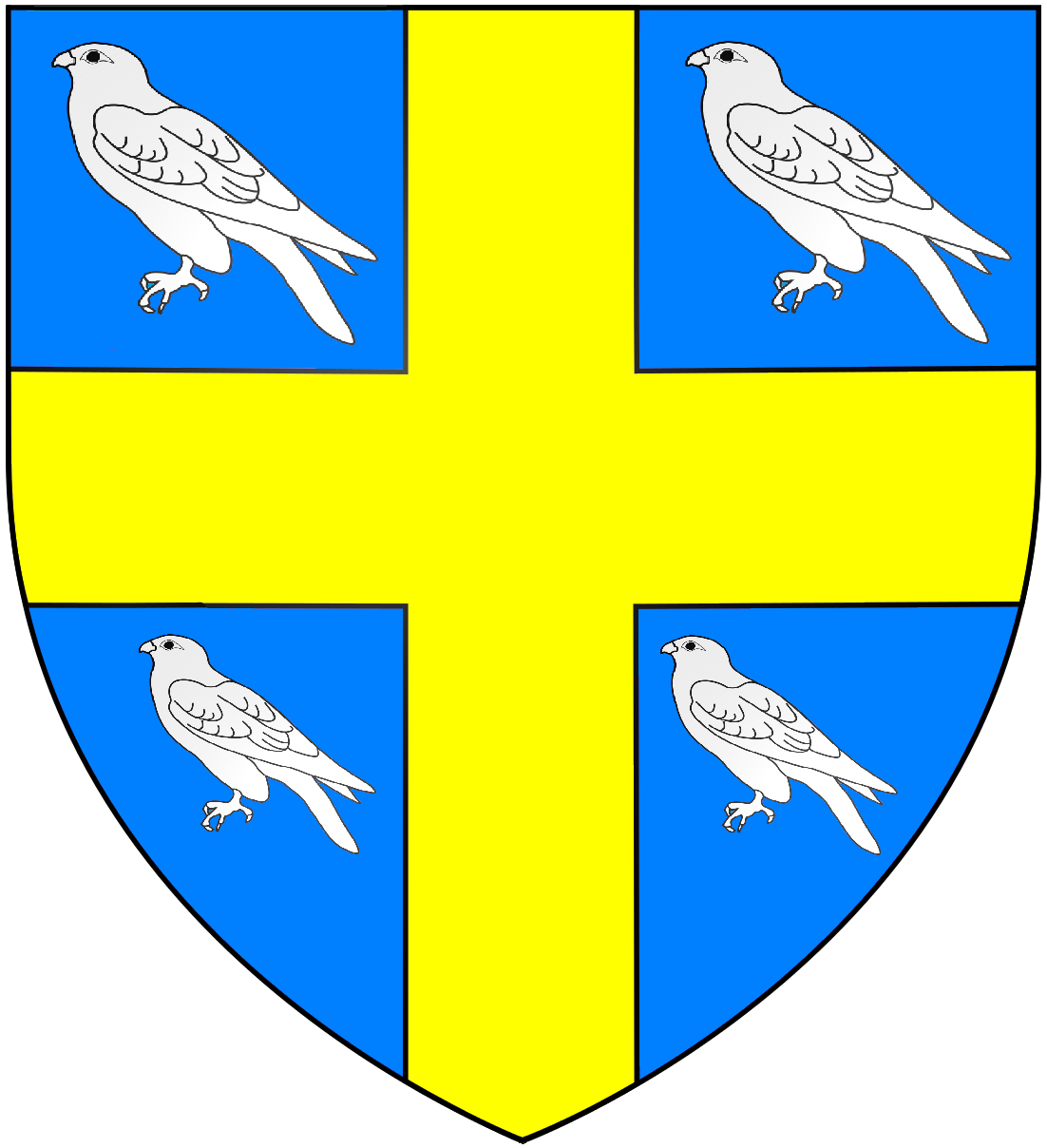
Arms of Wriothesley, Earls of Southampton: Azure, a cross or between four hawks close argent

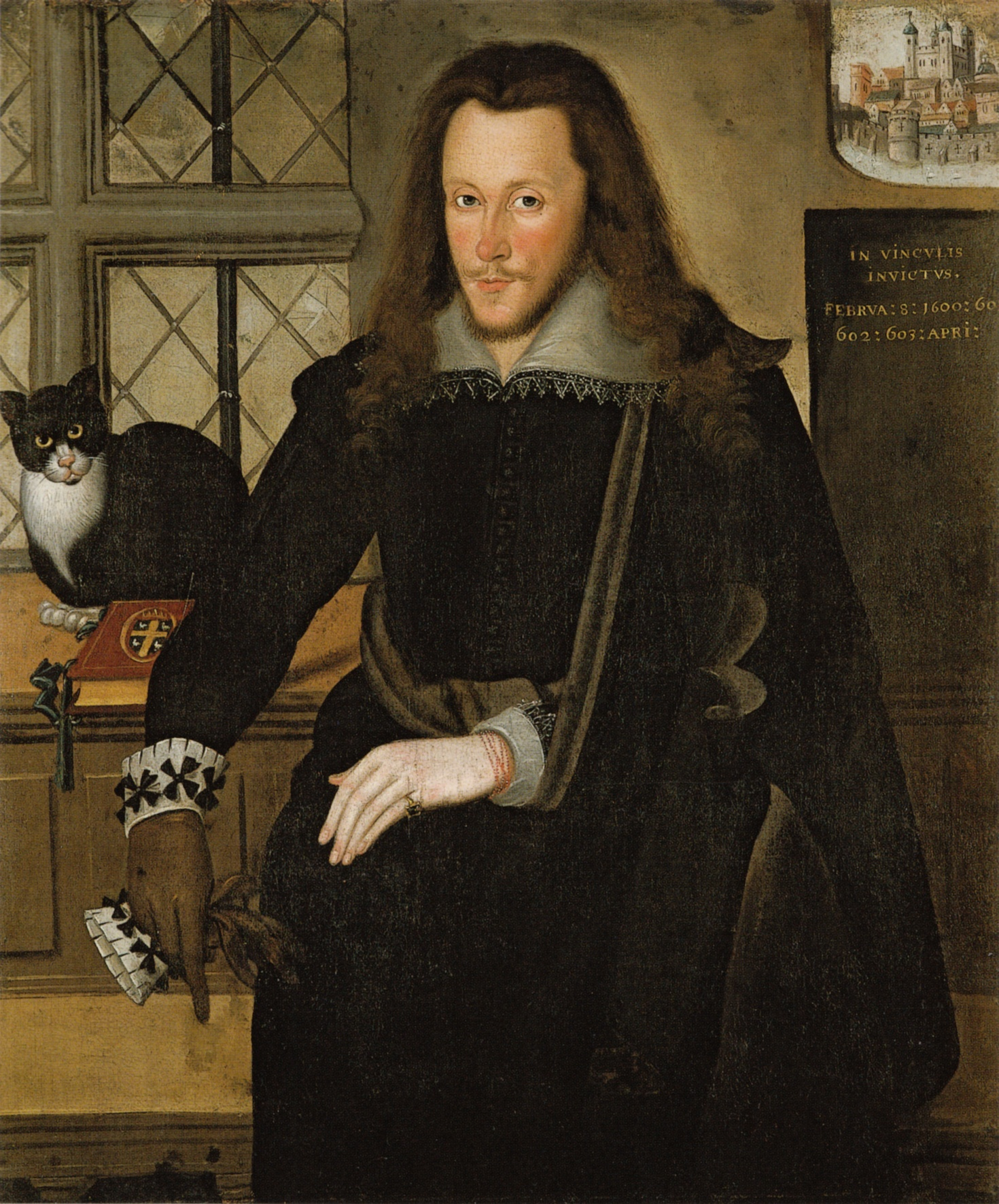
Henry Wriothesley, 3rd Earl of Southampton

Earl of Southampton was a title that was created three times in the Peerage of England.

Its first creation came in 1537 in favour of the courtier William FitzWilliam. He was childless and the title became extinct on his death in 1542.

Its second creation came in 1547 in favour of the politician Thomas Wriothesley, 1st Baron Wriothesley, Lord Chancellor between 1544 and 1547. He had already been created Baron Wriothesley (pronounced "rose ley" /ˈroʊzli/) in 1544, also in the Peerage of England. He was succeeded by his third but only surviving son, the second Earl. On his death the titles passed to his second but only surviving son, the third Earl. He is best remembered as a patron of William Shakespeare. He was succeeded by his second but only surviving son, the fourth Earl, who was a prominent statesman and served as Lord High Treasurer under Charles II between 1660 and 1667. In 1653 he had succeeded his father-in-law Francis Leigh, 1st Earl of Chichester as second Earl of Chichester according to a special remainder in the letters patent. However, Lord Southampton had no sons and the titles became extinct on his death in 1667.

The third creation came in 1670 for Barbara Palmer, mistress of Charles II. She was made Baroness Nonsuch and Duchess of Cleveland at the same time.

== Earls of Southampton; First creation (1537) ==
- William Fitzwilliam, 1st Earl of Southampton (1490–1542)

== Barons Wriothesley (1544) ==
- Thomas Wriothesley, 1st Baron Wriothesley (1505–1550) (created Earl of Southampton in 1547)

== Earls of Southampton; Second creation (1547) ==
- Thomas Wriothesley, 1st Earl of Southampton (1505–1550)
  - William Wriothesley (1535–1537)
  - Anthony Wriothesley (1542–1542)
- Henry Wriothesley, 2nd Earl of Southampton (1545–1581)
- Henry Wriothesley, 3rd Earl of Southampton (1573–1624)
  - James Wriothesley, Lord Wriothesley (1605–1624)
- Thomas Wriothesley, 4th Earl of Southampton, 2nd Earl of Chichester (1607–1667)

== Earls of Southampton; Third creation (1670) ==
- see Duke of Cleveland

== See also ==
- Duke of Southampton
- Baron Southampton
- Earl of Winchester
