= Cowdray House =

Ruins of one of England's great Tudor houses

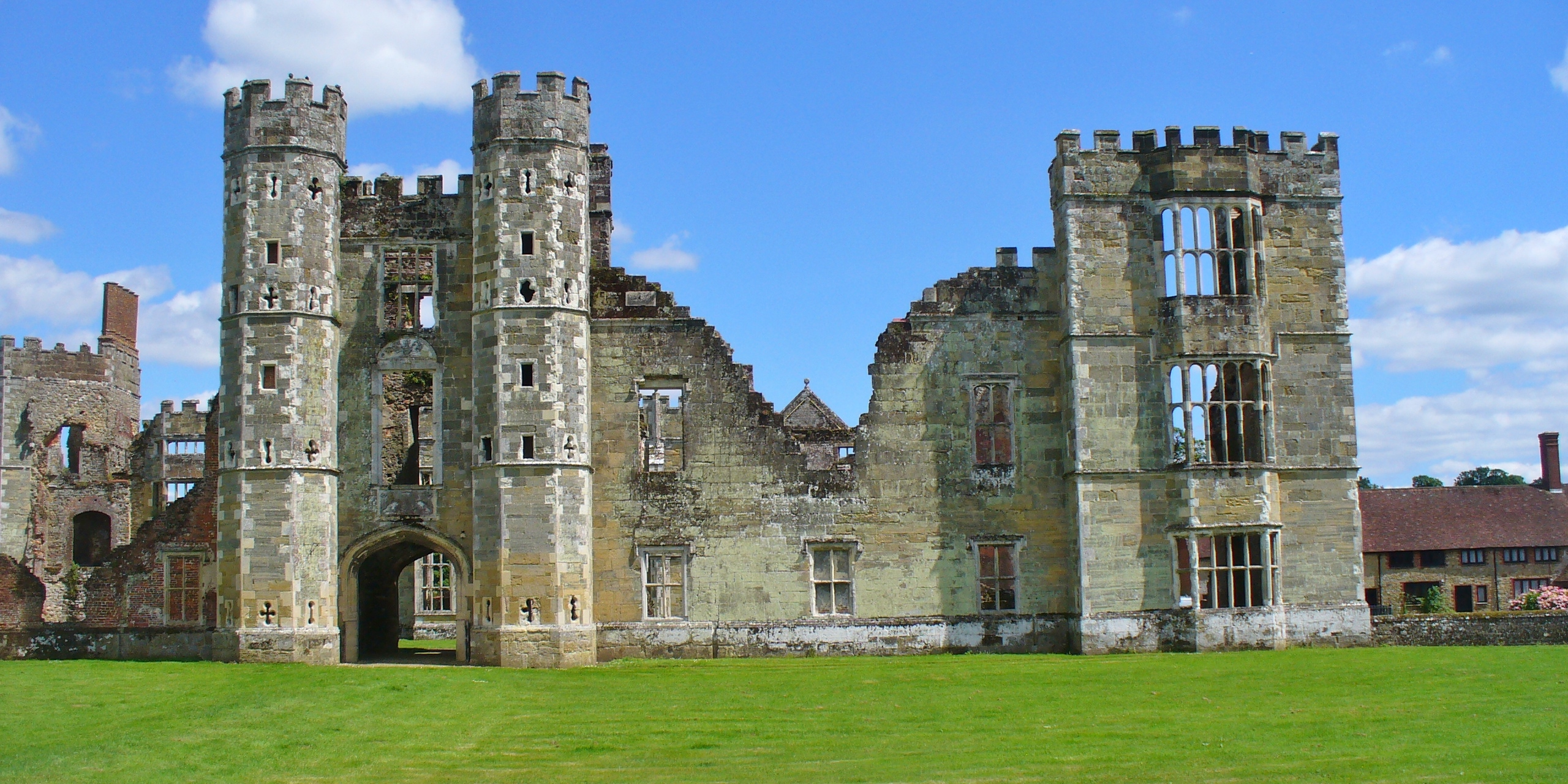
- The ruins of Cowdray House with the three-storey gatehouse on the left

- Location within West Sussex

General information
- Location: Midhurst, West Sussex, England
- Coordinates: 50.9877°N 0.7317°W
- Construction started: c. 1520
- Destroyed: 24 September 1793
- Owner: Viscount Cowdray

Cowdray House consists of the ruins of one of England's great Tudor houses, architecturally comparable to many of the great palaces and country houses of that time. It is situated in the parish of Easebourne, just east of Midhurst, West Sussex standing on the north bank of the River Rother. It was largely destroyed by fire on 24 September 1793, but the ruins are Grade I listed for their historical importance.

The house is also known for a series of now destroyed and very detailed paintings of near contemporary events in Tudor England, whose appearances have survived in various published etchings made over the centuries when they existed.

== Manor house ==
The original fortified manor house was built between 1273 and 1284 by Sir John Bohun across the river from the town of Midhurst. He named it Coudreye, the Norman word for the nearby hazel woods.

== 16th century ==
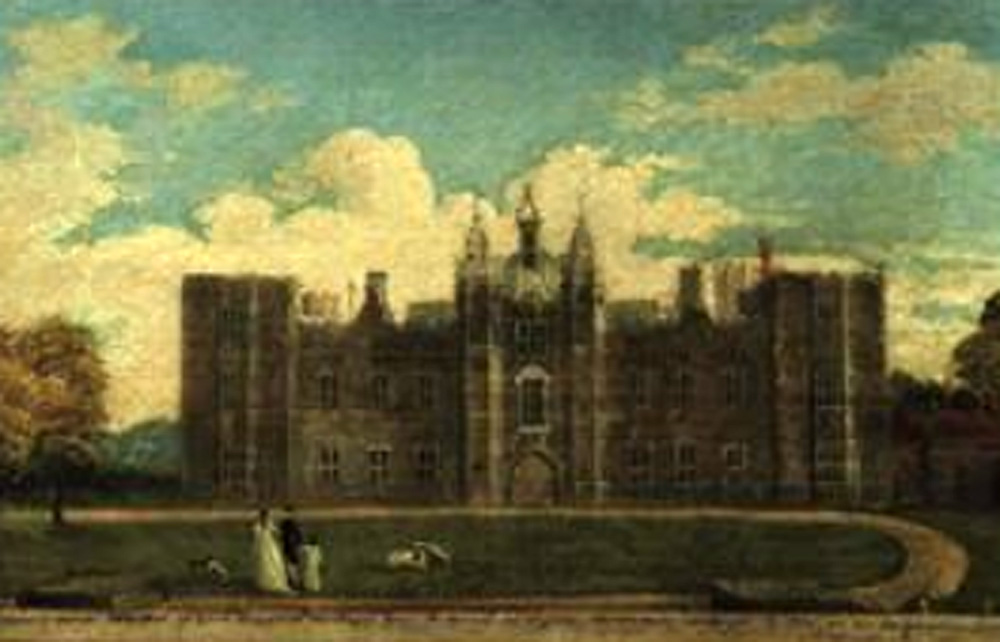
Painting of Cowdray House circa 1790 before its decay.

In the 1520s, Sir David Owen, uncle to Henry VII, began construction of the current Cowdray House on the site of the former home Coudreye, which he had acquired upon the death of his wife Mary Bohun in 1496.

The main entrance was through a three-story gatehouse. Gatehouses were often a focus of display, and the approach to the entrance was via a causeway across marshy ground. The historian Audrey Thorstad suggests that dictating the approach to the castle was drawn from medieval practices, and the reflections in the watery landscape would have enhanced the appearance of the gatehouse.

In 1529, Sir David's son, Henry, sold the estate of Cowdray to Sir William Fitzwilliam. In 1533 Henry VIII granted a licence to Fitzwilliam's trustees to impark 600 acres (240 ha) of meadow, pasture and wood and build fortifications at "Cowdry".

In 1536, following the Dissolution of the Monasteries, Sir William was given the nearby Easebourne Priory and other properties, whilst in 1538 his half-brother and heir who later inherited Cowdray, Anthony Browne, received Battle Abbey. It is rumoured that a dispossessed monk from Battle cursed the family and house by fire and water, thy line shall come to an end and it shall perish out of this land.

Henry VIII made five visits to the house during his reign, in August 1538, July 1539 and August 1545.

In November 1538, the last surviving member of the House of Plantagenet, Margaret Pole, 8th Countess of Salisbury, was imprisoned at Cowdray until September 1539. She was the niece of Richard III, the last Plantagenet king who died at Bosworth Field in 1485. She was removed to the Tower of London, and was executed in May 1541.

In 1548, Anthony Browne's son, Sir Anthony Browne inherited Cowdray; he was later ennobled as the 1st Viscount Montague upon the marriage of Queen Mary I to King Philip II of Spain. Mary of Guise, widow of James V of Scotland, stayed a night at Cowdray in October 1551. Edward VI visited in July 1552, and wrote to his friend Barnaby Fitzpatrick that they "rather excessively banqueted".

Elizabeth I came to Cowdray on 14 August 1591. She was welcomed by a "personage in armour" who offered her the keys to the house. A few days later, while walking in the gardens an actor dressed as a pilgrim showed her an oak tree decorated with the heraldic shields of local knights. A "wild man" told her that treachery could not uproot the oak. The next evening, at the fish ponds, a fisherman and a netter performed a loyal dialogue. The speeches and entertainments for Elizabeth were printed later in the year.

Henry Wriothesley, 3rd Earl of Southampton (1573–1624), courtier and literary patron, was born at Cowdray House on 6 October 1573. He was the third child and only surviving son of Henry Wriothesley, 2nd Earl of Southampton, and his wife, Mary Browne, daughter of the first Viscount Montagu. Wriothesley is famous as the dedicatee of Shakespeare's Venus and Adonis and The Rape of Lucrece, and the likely inspiration for the 'fair youth' of Shakespeare's Sonnets.

== Cowdray engravings ==
16th-century wall-paintings, originally commissioned by Sir Anthony Browne, were painted onto the walls of Browne's hall in Cowdray House. The original paintings were destroyed by fire in 1793 but had been copied in published etchings while they existed.

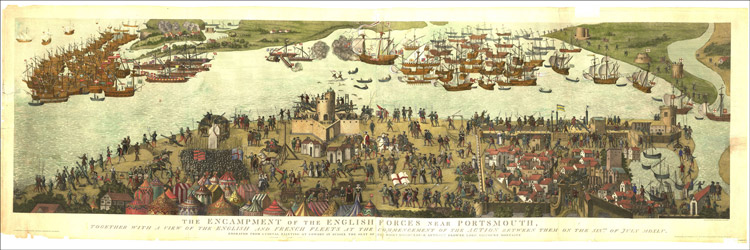
The encampment of the English forces near Portsmouth, together with a view of the English and French fleets at the commencement of the action between them on the XIXst of July MDXLV,1544

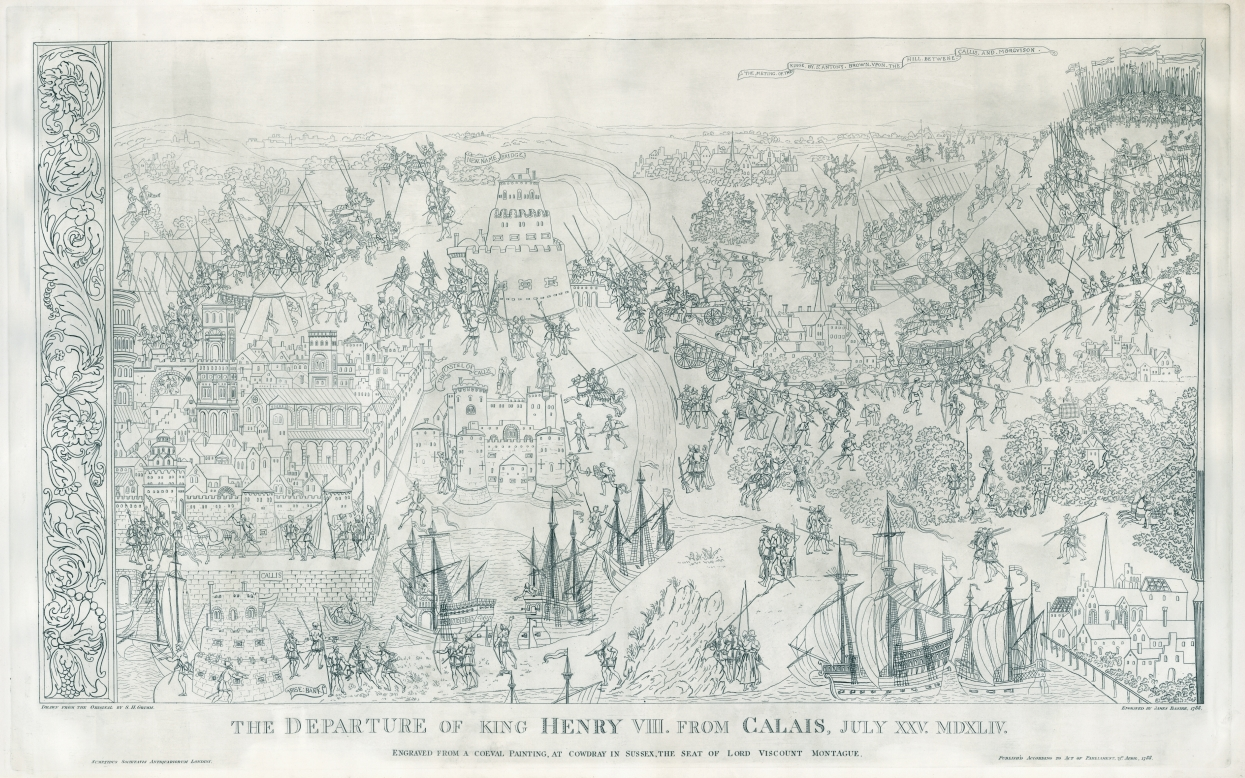
The Departure of King Henry VIII from Calais, on 25 July 1544, Subtitled 'The Meting of the Kinge by S'r Antony Brown Upon the Hill Betweene Callis and Morguison

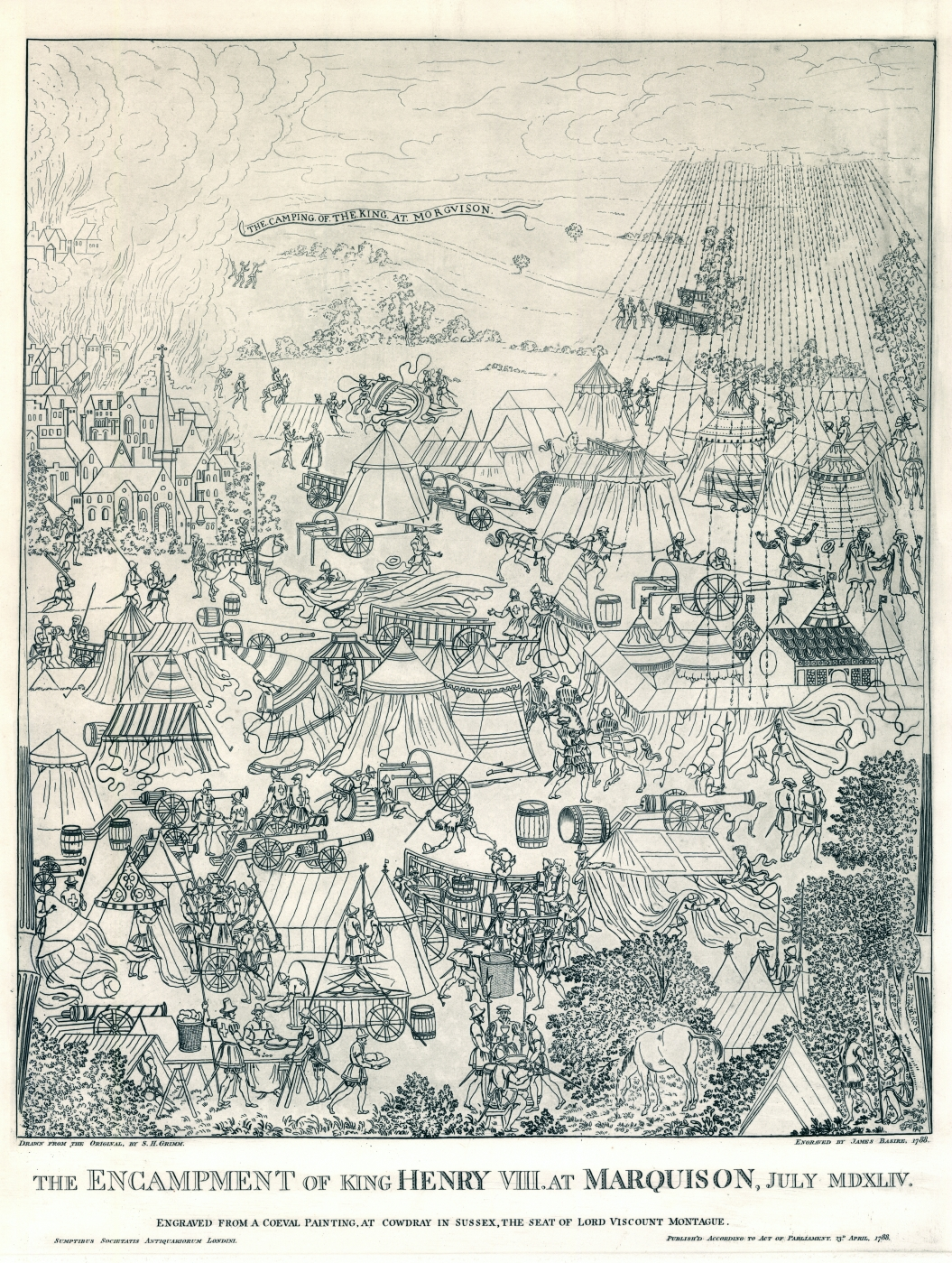
The Encampment of King Henry VIII at Marquison (Marquise), in July 1544

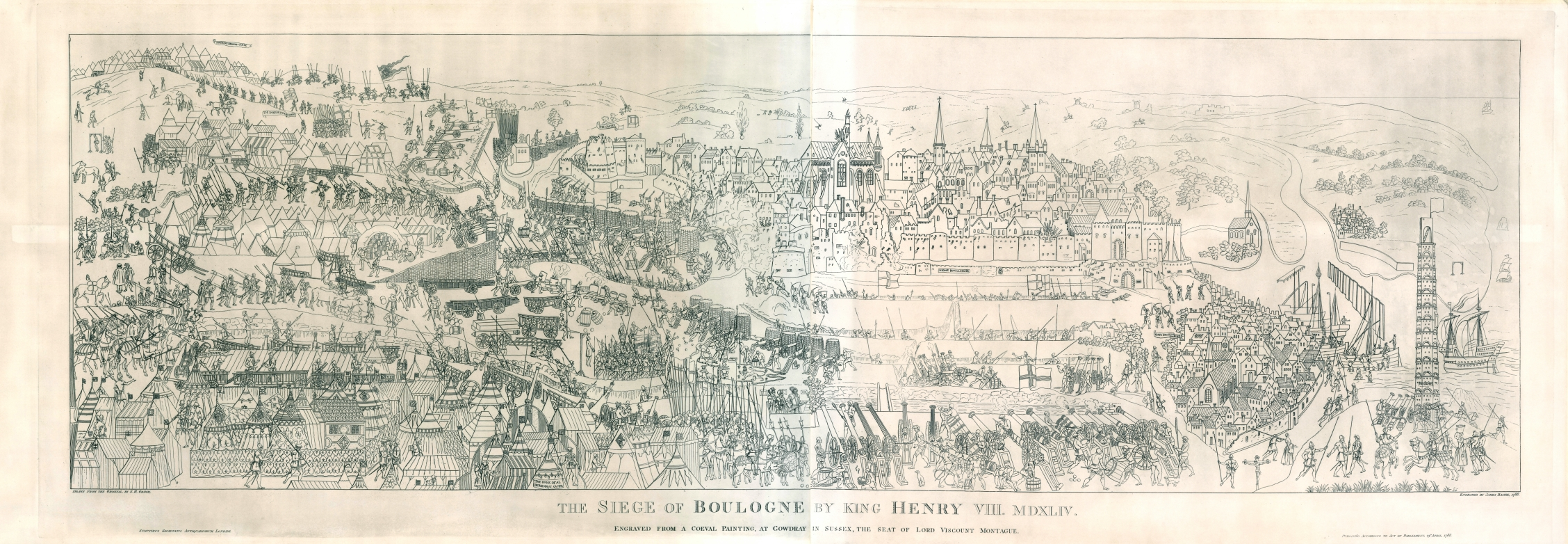
The Siege of Boulogne by King Henry VIII in 1544

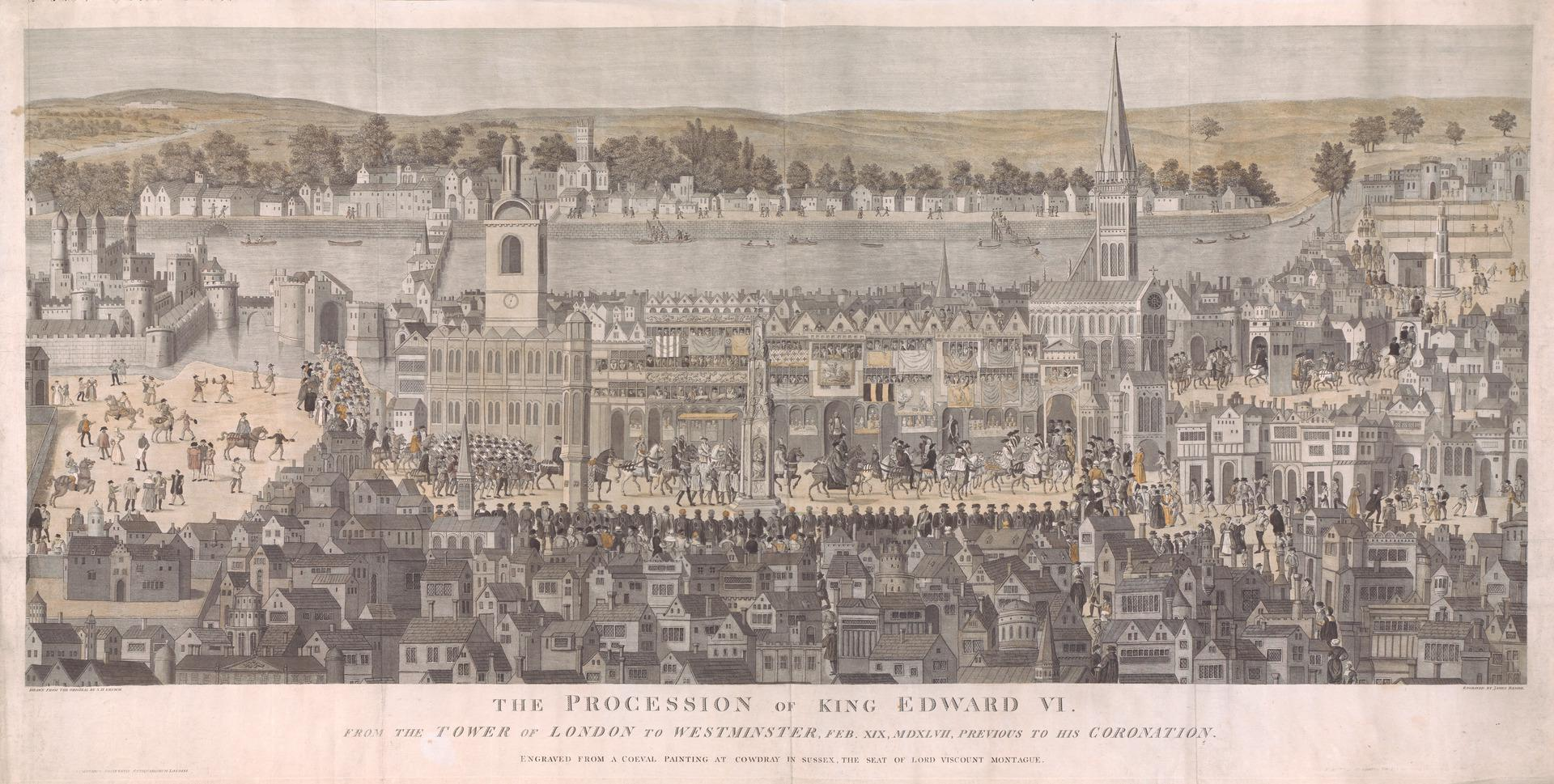
The coronation procession of King Edward VI from the Tower to Westminster (1547)

== 17th century ==
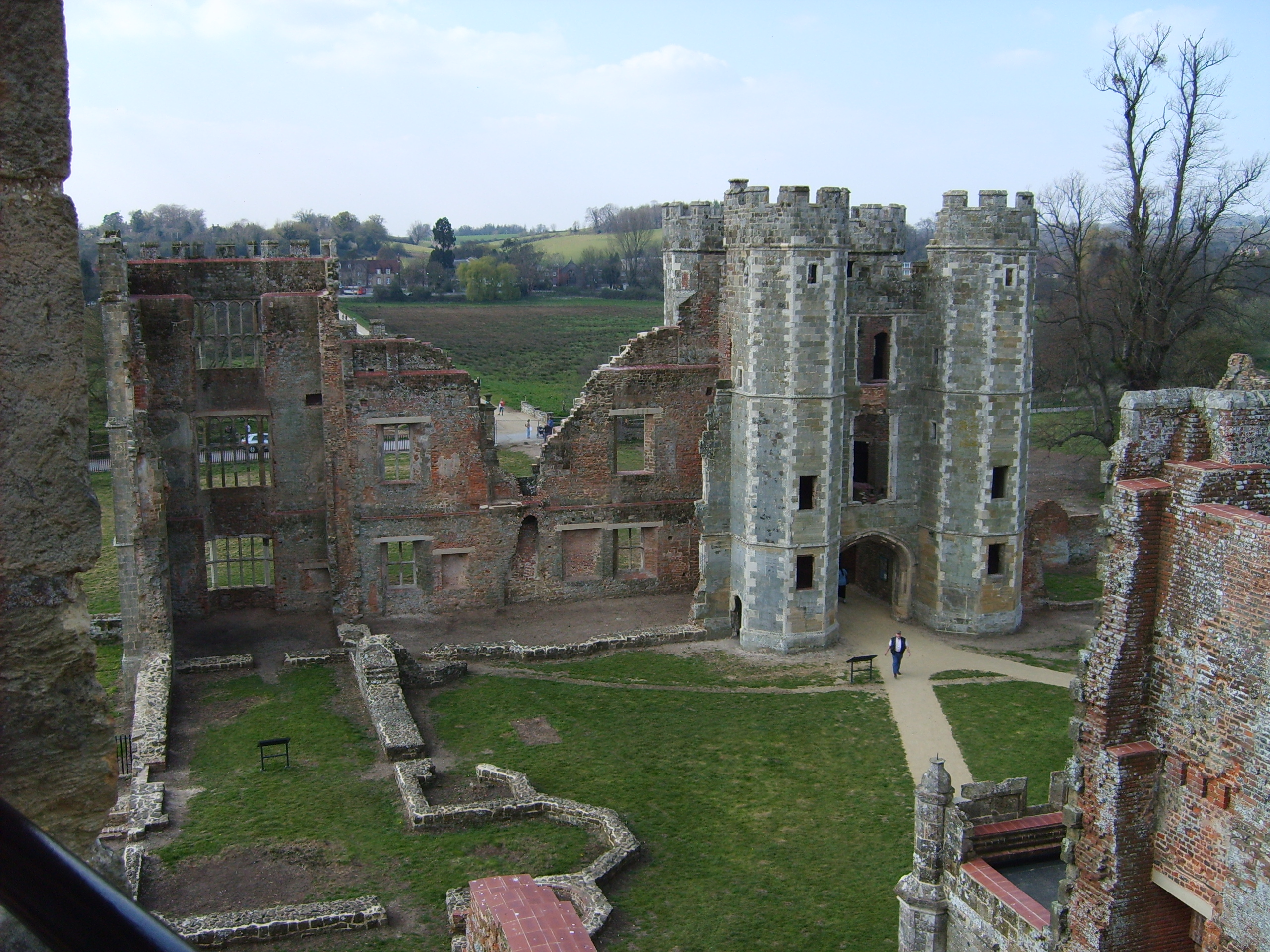
Cowdray Ruins

In 1592, the 1st Viscount's grandson Anthony-Maria Browne inherited Cowdray. During his ownership of Cowdray, Guy Fawkes was briefly employed as a footman and the 2nd Viscount was briefly imprisoned for complicity in the Gunpowder Plot after staying away from Parliament on 5 November 1605 following a warning.

In the mid-1640s, Robert May was employed as a cook at Cowdray House.

During the English Civil War, two-thirds of the Cowdray estate were sequestered from Francis Browne, 3rd Viscount Montagu, and the house was garrisoned by Parliamentary forces. There are marks on the walls of the main courtyard of the house thought to be from musketballs fired by soldiers during this time.

== 18th century ==
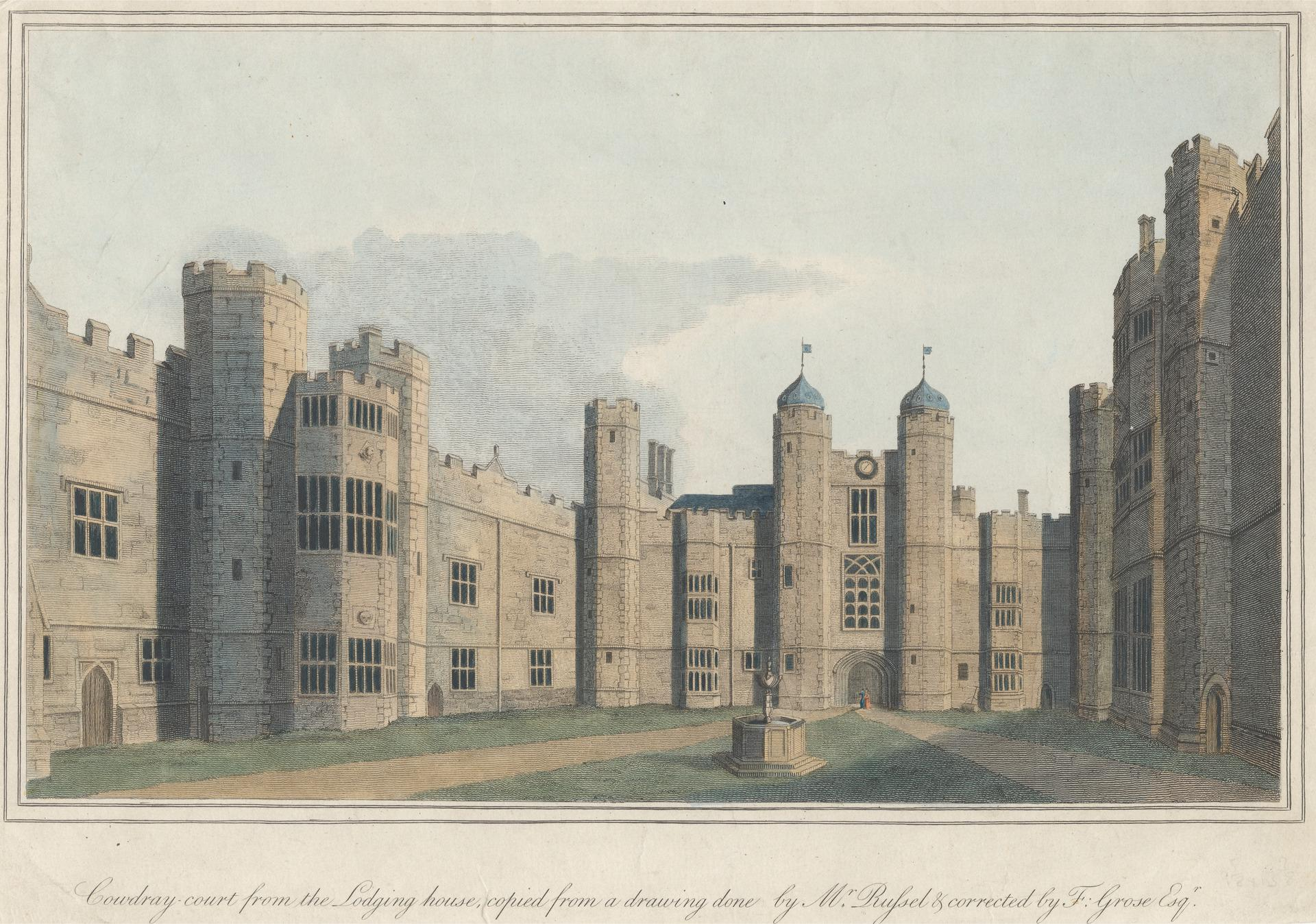
Cowdray Court from the Lodging House, before the fire by Francis Grose

In 1770, under the ownership of Anthony Browne, 7th Viscount Montagu, Capability Brown was employed to modernise the gardens.

On 24 September 1793, during restoration work, a fire started in the carpenters' workshop in the North Gallery where some smouldering charcoal was allowed to fall upon the sawdust and woodshavings strewn across the floor. During the restoration work the family's furniture and treasures had also been stored in the North Gallery to make re-decorating easier. From the collection only three paintings and a few small pieces of furniture were saved, the rest including artefacts from Battle Abbey being devoured by flames.

Less than three weeks later, George Browne, 8th Viscount Montagu perished whilst trying to ride the Rhine Falls and the title passed to a descendant of the 2nd Viscount, Mark Browne who later died childless and the peerage became extinct. These two events marked the conclusion of the supposed curse set upon the family 250 years earlier. The estate was inherited by the 8th Viscount's sister and by marriage William Stephen Poyntz.

== 19th and 20th centuries ==
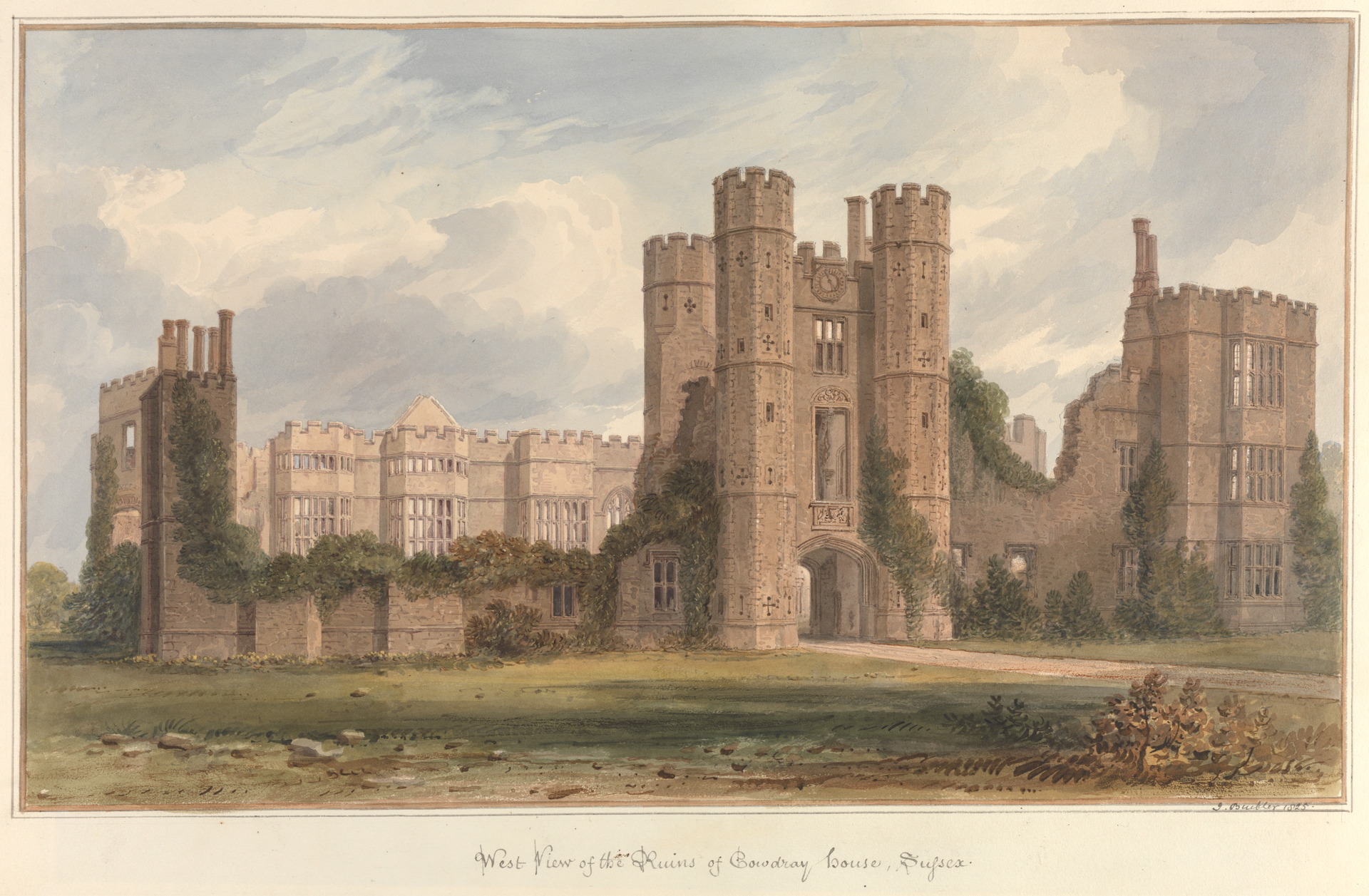
West view of the Ruins of Cowdray House, Sussex, John Buckler, John Chessell Buckler

During the early 19th century, the house was left to ruin; it was quickly colonised by plants, most notably ivy, which hastened its decay. Small alterations were made to the surviving Kitchen Tower such as a floor being put in above the kitchens, though it was not inhabited. Following the death of William Poyntz, the estate passed to his three daughters, but they could not decide how to divide the estate and it was eventually sold to George Perceval, 6th Earl of Egmont in 1843.

In 1908, the 8th Earl of Egmont sold the estate to Sir Weetman Dickinson Pearson, becoming Baron Cowdray of Midhurst and later in 1917 became the 1st Viscount Cowdray. The Viscount put a halt to the decay, arranging for the careful removal of the ivy, the restoration of any unsafe structures and a full survey of the ruins to be completed.

== 21st century ==
The house remains under the ownership of Viscount Cowdray, currently Michael Pearson, 4th Viscount Cowdray, who inherited it in 1995. Following a major preservation/conservation project in 2006, the ruins were opened to visitors on 31 March 2007. The Ruins is looked after by a charity, Cowdray Heritage Trust.

Cowdray House featured largely in Anya Seton's 1972 historical romance Green Darkness.

== See also ==
- Cowdray Park, West Sussex, the nearby replacement house.
