= Henry Wriothesley, 2nd Earl of Southampton =

English peer

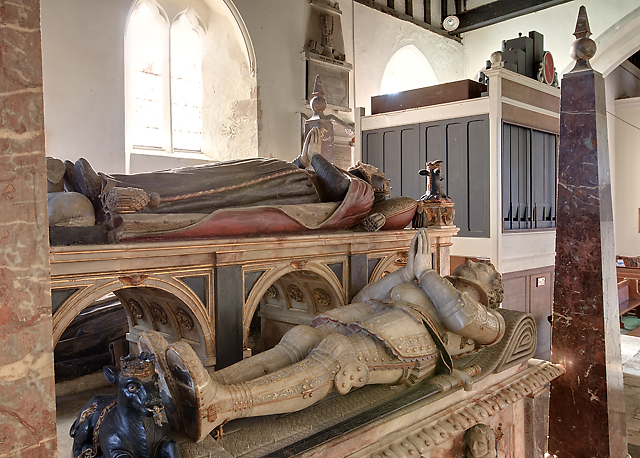
- Tomb effigy at Titchfield of Henry Wriothesley, 2nd Earl of Southampton, with that of his mother above
- Born: 24 April 1545
- Died: 4 October 1581 (aged 36); Itchell, Hampshire
- Noble family: Wriothesley
- Spouse: Mary Browne
- Issue: Henry Wriothesley, 3rd Earl of Southampton; Mary Wriothesley
- Father: Thomas Wriothesley, 1st Earl of Southampton
- Mother: Jane Cheney

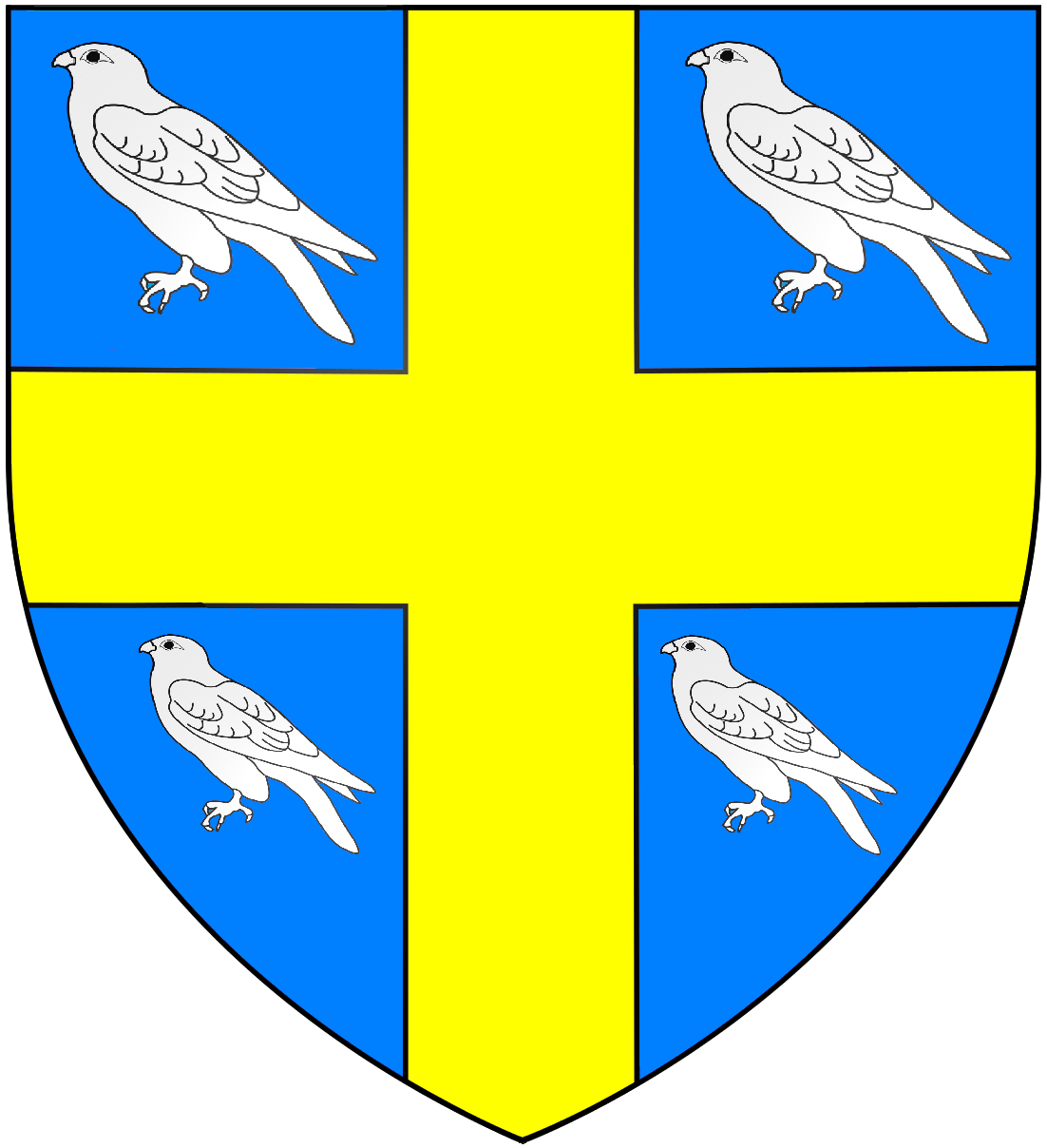
Arms of Wriothesley: Azure, a cross or between four hawks close argent

Henry Wriothesley, 2nd Earl of Southampton (pronunciation uncertain: /ˈraɪzli/ RYE-zlee (archaic), /ˈrɒtsli/ ROTT-slee (present-day) and /ˈraɪəθsli/ RYE-əths-lee have been suggested) (24 April 1545 – 4 October 1581), was an English peer.

== Family ==
Henry Wriothesley, born 24 April 1545, was the only surviving son of Thomas Wriothesley, 1st Earl of Southampton, and Jane Cheney (d. 15 September 1574), the daughter and heiress of William Cheney of Chesham Bois, Buckinghamshire, by Emma Walwyn, daughter of Thomas Walwyn. At his christening on 24 April 1545 at St Andrew's, Holborn, he was honoured in having King Henry VIII and the King's brother-in-law, Charles Brandon, 1st Duke of Suffolk, as godfathers, and the King's daughter, Princess Mary, as godmother. Henry Fitzalan, 12th Earl of Arundel, was godfather at the bishoping or confirmation.

Wriothesley had two brothers who both died young, and five sisters:

- Elizabeth (buried 16 January 1555), who married Thomas Radcliffe, 3rd Earl of Sussex, as his first wife;
- Mary (d. December 1561), who married firstly, Richard Lyster, grandson of Sir Richard Lyster, and secondly, William Shelley of Michelgrove;
- Katherine, who was contracted to marry Sir Matthew Arundell, but instead married Sir Thomas Cornwallis;
- Anne, who was contracted to marry Sir Henry Wallop, but who died before the marriage could take place; and
- Mabel, who married Sir Walter Sandys.

== Life and career ==
=== Minority ===
From 1547 until his father's death on 30 July 1550 he was styled Lord Wriothesley. At his father's death he inherited the earldom at the age of five, and became a royal ward. His custody and marriage were granted, on 14 December 1550, to Sir William Herbert.

According to Akrigg, it appears that Southampton's wardship was subsequently acquired by his mother, Jane, while Elzinga states that the wardship was eventually granted in 1560 to Sir William More of Loseley. Whatever the case, Southampton remained for some years with his mother, Jane Cheney, a devout Catholic. Southampton, brought up by her in that religion, remained Catholic throughout his lifetime. As Akrigg summed it up, 'the key to the unhappy life of the second Earl of Southampton is to be found in his fervent Catholicism'.

=== Marriage and lavish household ===
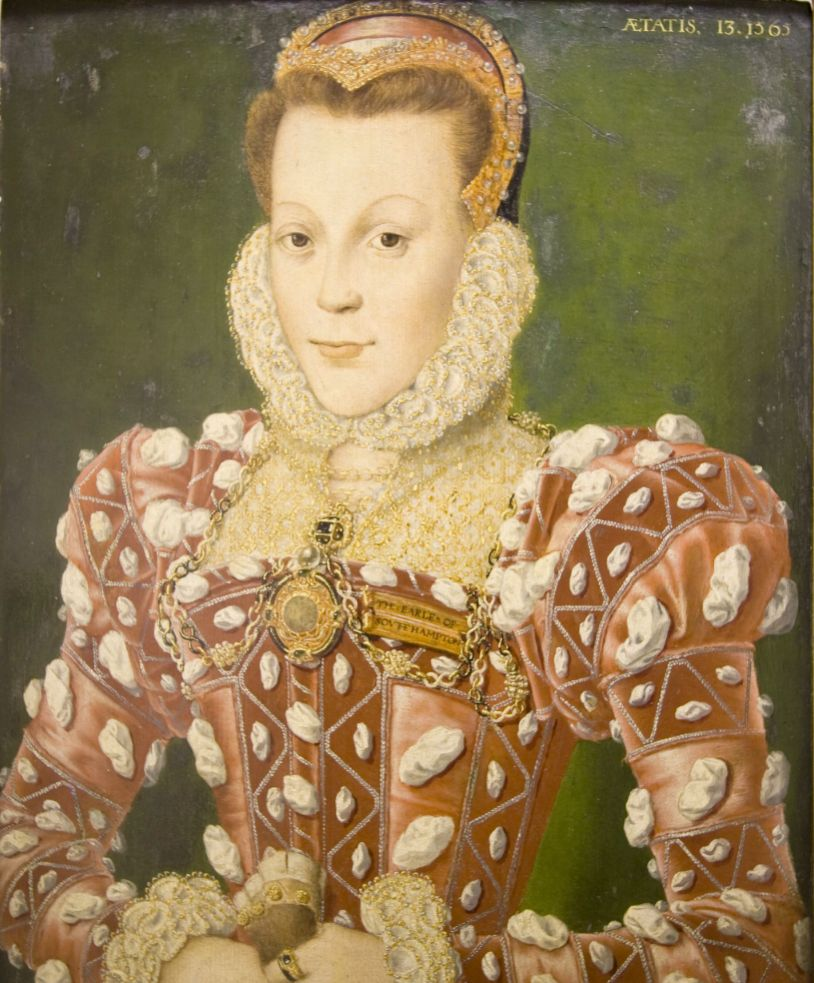
Mary Browne (1552–1607)

On 19 February 1566, at her father's house in London, Southampton (aged twenty) married the thirteen-year-old Mary Browne (d. 1607), daughter of Anthony Browne, 1st Viscount Montagu, by Jane Radcliffe, the daughter of Robert Radcliffe, 1st Earl of Sussex. On 19 March 1566 he was admitted to Lincoln's Inn. On reaching the age of majority in 1566 he sued his livery, and was granted licence to enter on his lands by letters patent dated 7 February 1568. According to Elzinga, Southampton had six residences and landed income between £2000 and £3000 in the 1560s, and 'lived in a grand way, maintaining a large and lavish household'.

=== Suspicious Lambeth marsh meeting exposed ===
The strains between Southampton's religion and the Elizabethan regime first became apparent when in February 1569 Southampton's brother-in-law, the Earl of Sussex, wrote to Sir William Cecil urging that Southampton be 'rather charitably won than severely corrected'. That summer Queen Elizabeth was Southampton's guest at Titchfield Abbey, but in November both Southampton and his father-in-law, Viscount Montague, were implicated in the Northern Rebellion. In a letter dated 1 December 1569 the Spanish ambassador, Guerau de Spes, wrote to the Duke of Alba that both Montague and Southampton 'have sent to me for advice as to whether they should take up arms or go over to your Excellency'. According to Akrigg, Montague and Southampton set sail for Flanders, but were driven back by contrary winds.

Although they were ordered to come immediately to court to explain their actions, to all appearances things were smoothed over, and neither Southampton nor his father-in-law was punished for his involvement. However matters came to a head in May 1570 when Pope Pius V excommunicated the Queen, and English Catholics were required to choose between loyalty to religion and loyalty to the sovereign. Southampton sought counsel from John Lesley, Bishop of Ross, at a secret meeting in the marshes of Lambeth, where they were intercepted by the watch, and in consequence, on 18 June 1570 the Privy Council ordered Southampton's arrest and confined him to the house of Henry Becher, Sheriff of London. On 15 July he was placed in the custody of Sir William More at Loseley, where More was under instructions to induce Southampton to take part in Protestant devotions in the household. After doing so, Southampton was released in November 1570.

A year later, in September 1571, under questioning concerning the Ridolfi plot, the Bishop of Ross incriminated Southampton by revealing the entire story of their meeting in Lambeth marsh. Southampton was arrested at the end of October and confined to the Tower for 18 months. He was finally released on 1 May 1573, and again placed in the custody of Sir William More at Loseley. On 14 July he was permitted to live with his father-in-law at Cowdray, although his liberty was still restricted.

=== Birth of son and estrangement of Mary ===
On 6 October 1573 Southampton wrote elatedly to Sir William More to announce the birth of his son, Henry Wriothesley, 3rd Earl of Southampton. The next six years were a period of stability in Southampton's life, with the Queen granting him small offices and other signs of favour. His income was augmented at his mother's death in 1574, and he began construction of a mansion at Dogmersfield.

However his relationship with his wife, Mary, gradually deteriorated, and by about 1577 he forbade her ever to see again a certain Donsame, 'a common person'. When in 1580 it was reported to him that she had been seen at Dogmersfield with Donsame, he forever banished her his 'board and presence', forcing her to live at one of his Hampshire estates under close surveillance.

The Countess defended herself with spirit, denying adultery and accusing one of the Earl's servants, Thomas Dymock, of having been the cause of the contention between herself and her husband. Years later the Jesuit Robert Persons charged Charles Paget with having been responsible for the falling out between the Earl and his father-in-law over the Earl's treatment of his wife.

=== Further illicit contact and death ===
Matters took a further turn for the worse when the authorities were advised in August 1581 that the Jesuit Edmund Campion had been in contact with the Earl through Thomas Dymock. Southampton died 4 October 1581 at his house of Itchell, near Dogmersfield, Hampshire, and was buried at Titchfield on 30 November. He left an estate valued at £1097 6s per annum. In his will the Earl named both Thomas Dymock and Charles Paget as executors.

Both Dymock and Paget were alleged hostile to Countess Wriothesley who contested the will with some success, with support from Robert Dudley, 1st Earl of Leicester; by 11 December 1581 the Countess and the executors reached a settlement under which Dymock retained the Earl's generous bequests to him, but relinquished administration of the Earl's estate to another executor, Edward Gage.

== Marriage and issue ==
By Mary Browne Southampton had an only son, Henry Wriothesley, 3rd Earl of Southampton, and two daughters, Jane, who died before 1573, and Mary (c. 1567 – 1607), who married Thomas Arundell, 1st Baron Arundell of Wardour.

After Southampton's death his widow, Mary, married firstly, on 2 May 1595, as his second wife, Sir Thomas Heneage (d. 17 October 1595), Vice-Chamberlain of the Household, and secondly, sometime between 5 November 1598 and 31 January 1599, Sir William Hervey, with whom she remained until her death in November 1607. Her will was proved in 14 November, in which she directed burial at Titchfield as near as may be unto the body of my honorable and dearlie beloved Lord and husband Henrie late Earle of Southampton.

== Footnotes ==
Peerage of England
Preceded by Thomas Wriothesley	Earl of Southampton; 1550–1581	Succeeded by Henry Wriothesley
