= Dogmersfield =

Village and parish in Hampshire, England

Coordinates: 51.269877°N 0.874078°W

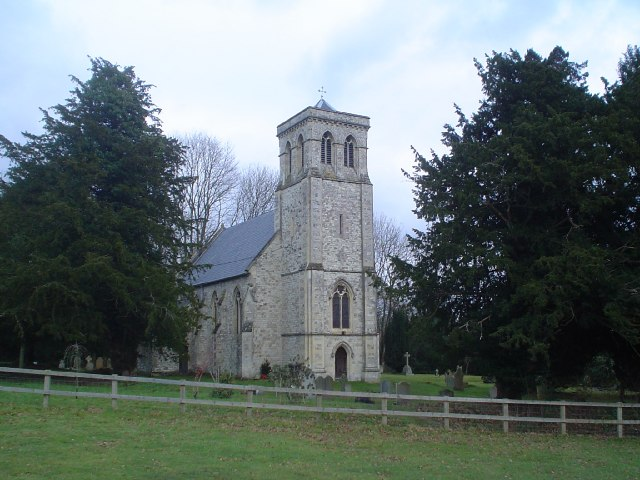
- All Saints' Church

- Location within Hampshire
- Population: 317 (2021 Census)
- District: Hart (district)
- Shire county: Hampshire
- Region: South East
- Country: England
- Sovereign state: United Kingdom
- Post town: Hook, Hart
- Postcode district: RG27
- Dialling code: 01252
- Police: Hampshire and Isle of Wight
- Fire: Hampshire and Isle of Wight
- Ambulance: South Central
- UK Parliament: North East Hampshire
- Website: www.dogmersfieldparish.co.uk

Dogmersfield is a small village lying between the towns of Fleet and Hartley Wintney in Hampshire, England. The M3 motorway and railway stations at Fleet and Winchfield provide routes to London.

Places of interest include the village church, which is dedicated to All Saints, the Queen's Head pub and a mansion house, Dogmersfield Park. Henry VIII's elder brother Arthur, Prince of Wales, and his bride Catherine of Aragon are said to have stayed in the village. The land where the manor is located was recorded in the Domesday Book of 1086 as "Doccemere feld".

Dogmersfield Church of England Primary School was built in 1911. Every year the school has a May Fair with traditional Maypole dancing and crowning of the May Queen. Other education facilities in the areas are St Nicholas' School and the Lord Wandsworth College.

The Basingstoke Canal runs through Dogmersfield.

== Dogmersfield House ==
Dogmersfield House, originally built by the St John-Mildmays in 1727, was Reed's School in the mid-1900s and later became the Noviciate and house of studies for the De La Salle Order, a Roman Catholic institute of teaching Brothers. After they left the site, it was partly burned down, the remainder falling into disrepair. It was subsequently restored and enlarged, and then occupied by both the Amdahl Corporation and then Systems Union.

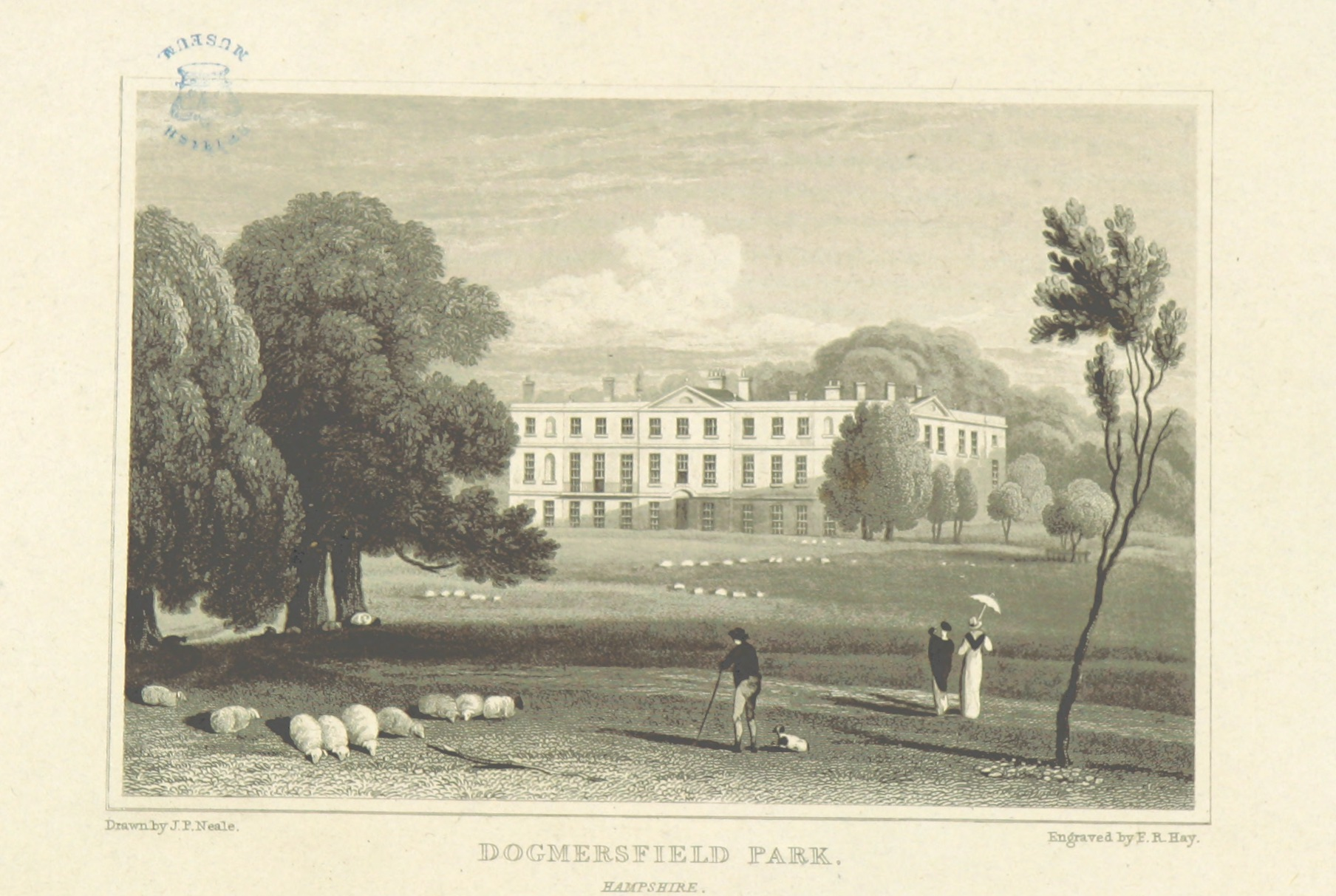
Engraving of Dogmersfield Park, after drawing by Neale (1818)

Following the De La Salle ownership of the house it was sold to the Vallance family, the owners of Daneshill School, who relocated from its previous home in Old Basing, at Daneshill House. Owing to increasingly stringent fire safety regulations and market forces it became uneconomic to accommodate boarders in the main house and smaller premises were sought. The house was both a family home and a school. The property was sold on to an investor who had the intention of opening a health farm; however, this never happened owing to a devastating fire that took place in 1981.

The new owners completed renovations, setting up the manor for office use. They sold the property in 1996 and it was again up for sale in 2000. Since spring 2005, after completion of a major renovation, the manor, on 500 acres, has operated as the Four Seasons Hotel Hampshire.

== Sports ==
The village is home to Dogmersfield Cricket Club (nicknamed The Dogs), who play their home games at the St. John Milday Ground (known locally as the Dog Bowl).

== See also ==
- Basingstoke Canal
