= John Dormer =

John Dormer may refer to:

- Sir John Dormer (of Dorton) (died 1629) English MP for Clitheroe and Aylesbury
- John Dormer (Parliamentarian) (c. 1611–1679) English MP for Buckingham
- Sir John Dormer, 1st Baronet (c. 1640–1675), of the Dormer baronets
- John Dormer (Jesuit) (1636–1700), English Jesuit
- John Dormer, 7th Baron Dormer (1691–1785), Baron Dormer
- John Baptist Joseph Dormer, 12th Baron Dormer (1830–1900), Baron Dormer

== See also ==
- Dormer (surname)
