= Robert Dormer =

Robert Dormer may refer to:

- Robert Dormer, 1st Baron Dormer (1551–1616)
- Robert Dormer, 1st Earl of Carnarvon (1610–1643)
- Robert Dormer (MP for Wycombe) (1485–1552), MP for Chipping Wycombe, 1529
- Robert Dormer (1650–1726), Member of Parliament for Aylesbury, Buckinghamshire and Northallerton
