= Charles Dormer, 2nd Earl of Carnarvon =

English peer

The Earl of Carnarvon
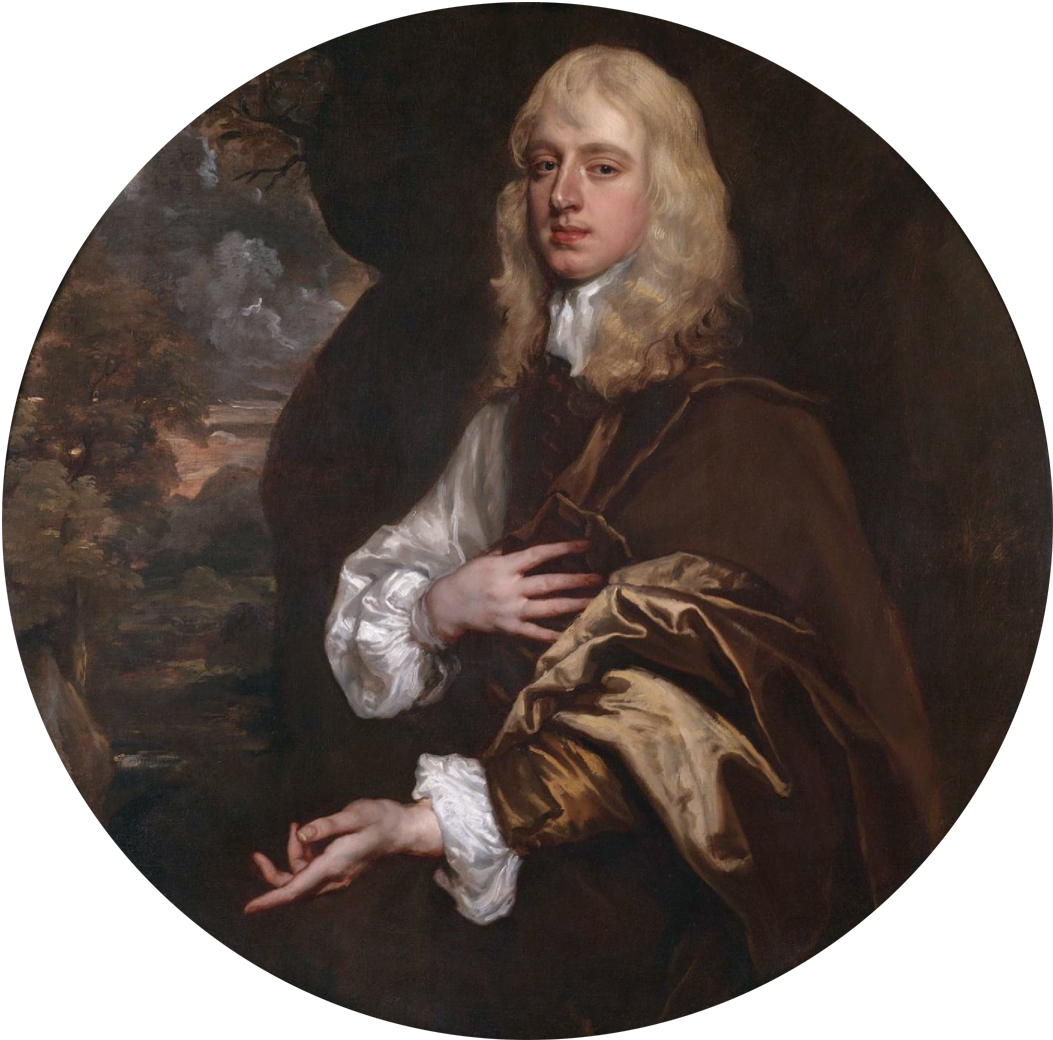
- Charles Dormer, 2nd Earl of Carnarvon, by (Peter Lely)
- Born: 25 October 1632
- Died: 29 November 1709 (aged 77); England
- Buried: England
- Spouse: Hon. Elizabeth Capel
- Issue: Lady Anna Sophia Dormer, Lady Elizabeth Dormer, Charles Dormer, 3rd Viscount Ascott, Lady Isabella Dormer
- Father: Robert Dormer, 1st Earl of Carnarvon
- Mother: Lady Anna Sophie Herbert

Sir Charles Dormer of Wing, 3rd Baronet, 2nd Earl of Carnarvon, 2nd Viscount Ascott, 3rd Baron Dormer of Winge (25 October 1632 – 29 November 1709) was an English peer. On his father's death at the First Battle of Newbury, on 20 September 1643, he succeeded to his father's titles, at just 10 years of age. His mother had died in June, a few months earlier. He married twice, had four children, but his only son predeceased him and so when he died in 1709 the earldom and the viscountcy became extinct. The baronetcy and barony were inherited by Rowland Dormer, 4th Baron Dormer, a grandson of the second son of the 1st Baron Dormer.

== Early life ==
Baptised in St Benet's in London, he was the son of Robert Dormer, 1st Earl of Carnarvon and Lady Anna Sophia Herbert, daughter of Philip Herbert, 4th Earl of Pembroke. Dormer was educated at the University of Oxford, where he graduated Master of Arts in 1648.

In 1643, on his father's death at the First Battle of Newbury, he succeeded to his father's titles and became Hereditary Chief Avenor and Keeper of the King's Hawks. His mother had died a few months earlier.

== Career ==
Carnarvon was witty, hospitable and extravagant; Samuel Pepys records his saying that God provides timber so that men may pay their debts. He rarely spoke on public affairs, but his intervention in the House of Lords debate on the impeachment of the Earl of Danby in December 1678 was crucial. In a speech of great wit and humour, he drew examples going back over a century to show that managing the impeachment of another public figure was virtually a guarantee of being impeached oneself and cheerfully urged his fellow peers to "mark the man who first dares to run down Lord Danby and see what becomes of him". The Lords then voted not to commit Danby to prison until he had been heard in his own defence.

He was a friend of the future Queen Anne, and was one of the few who remained loyal to her after her violent quarrel with William III and Mary II, which in 1692 led to her banishment from Court. When Anne was reconciled with William after Mary's death in 1694, Carnarvon noted with cynicism the large crowds at her house, and said he hoped she would remember the time when none of them called on her.

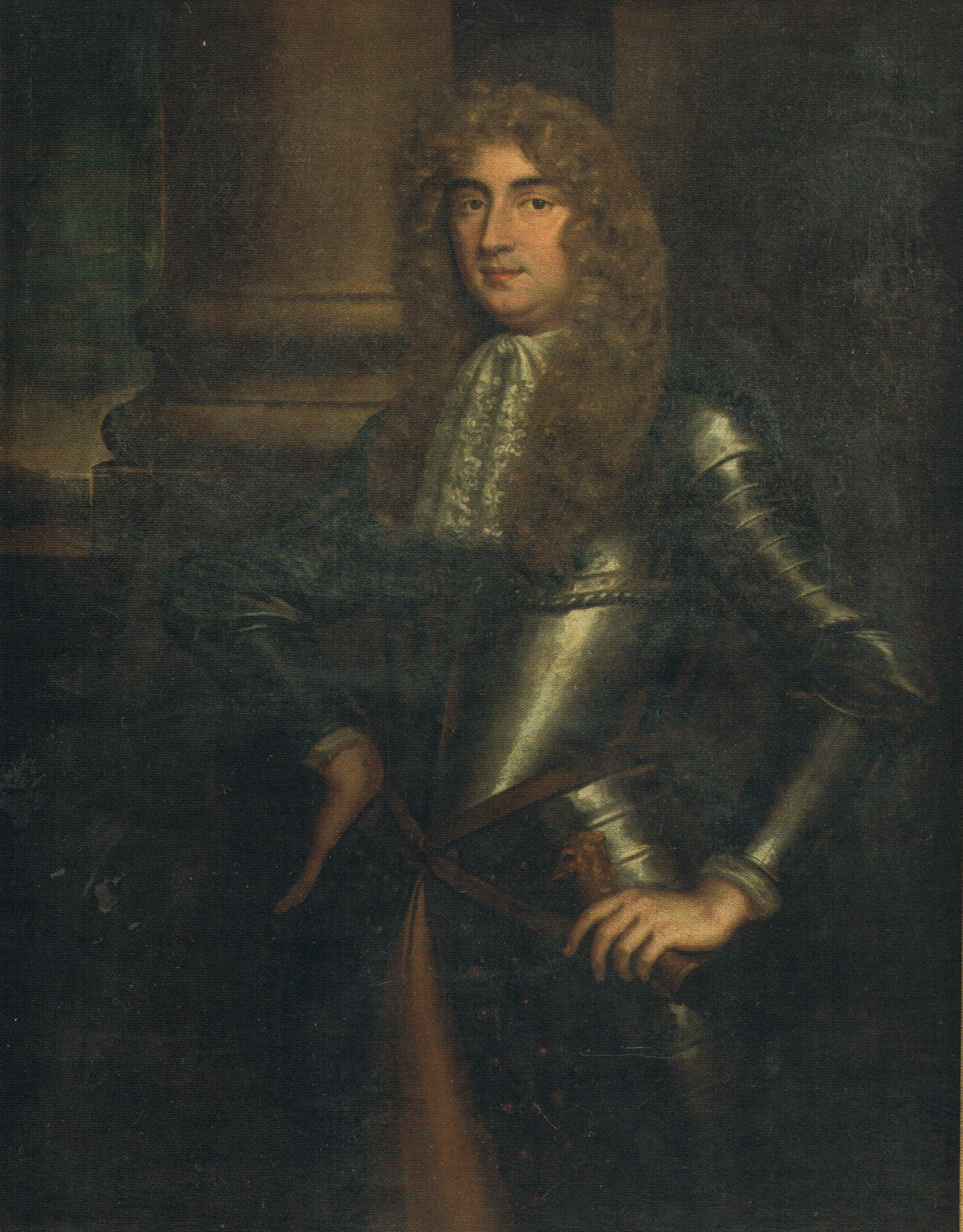
An oil-on-canvas portrait of Charles Dormer, 2nd Earl of Carnarvon, 50 x 40 inches.

== Marriage and family ==
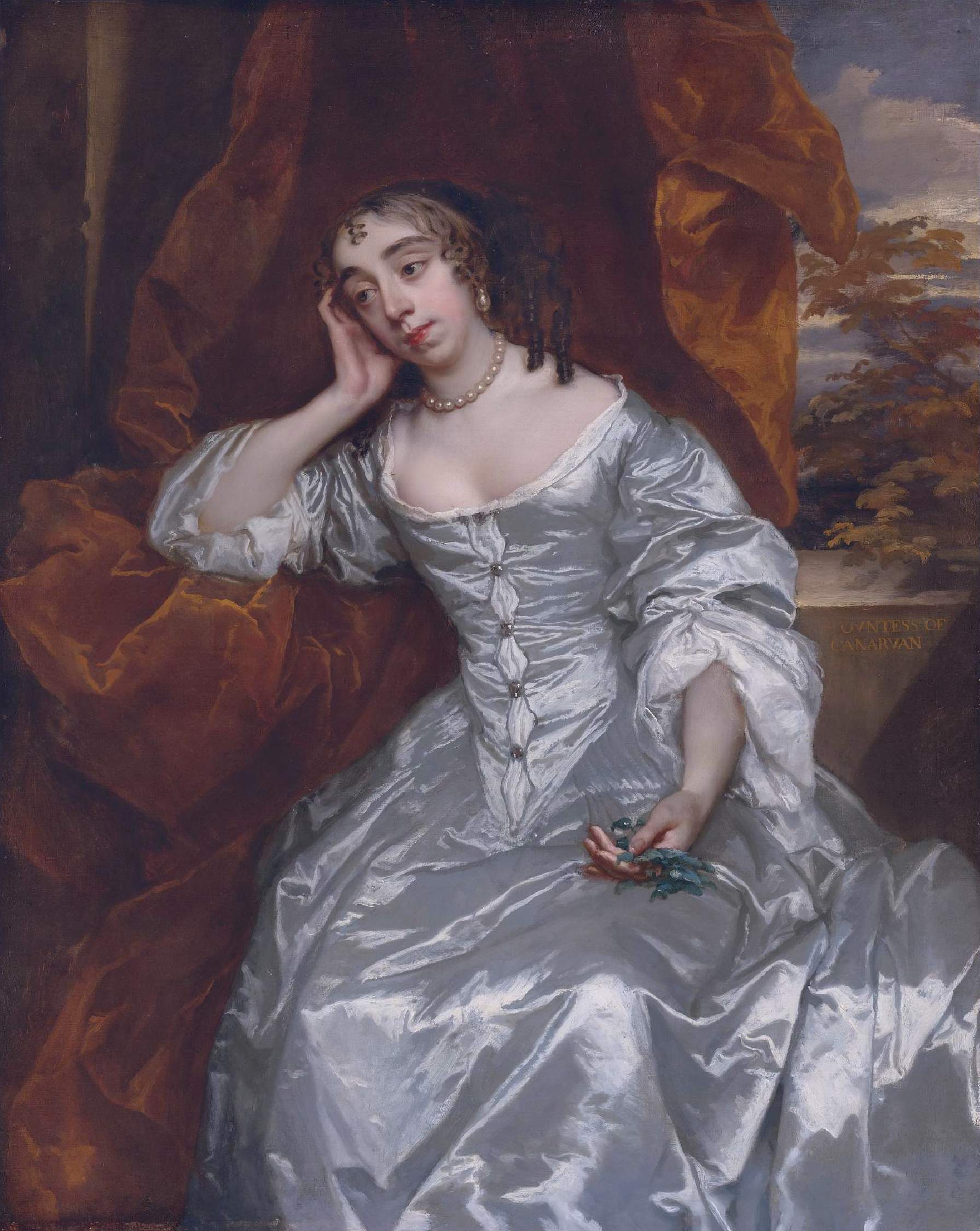
His first wife, Elizabeth Capel (Peter Lely)

Dormer was married twice. Firstly to Hon. Elizabeth Capel, daughter of the 1st Baron Capel and Elizabeth Morrison around 1653. They had 3 daughters and 1 son:

- Lady Anna Sophia Dormer
- Lady Elizabeth Dormer married Philip Stanhope, 2nd Earl of Chesterfield
- Charles Dormer, Viscount Ascott, born 25 June 1652, died before 1673. He matriculated at Christ Church, Oxford, Oxford, England, on 22 April 1664. He graduated from Merton College, Oxford University, Oxford, Oxfordshire, England, on 8 September 1665 with a Master of Arts (M.A.).
- Lady Isabella Dormer, born 27 August 1663, married Charles Coote, 3rd Earl of Mountrath and had issue

Secondly, he was married to Lady Mary Bertie (1655–1709), daughter of 2nd Earl of Lindsey and his second wife Bridget Wray, Baroness Norris, with whom he had no issue.

== Death and legacy ==
He died in Ascott House and was buried in Wing in Buckinghamshire. With his death, the earldom and the viscountcy became extinct, while the baronetcy and barony were inherited by Rowland Dormer, a grandson of the second son of the 1st Baron Dormer.

After his death, his estate passed to his daughters Elizabeth and Isabella.

Peerage of England
Preceded by Robert Dormer	Earl of Carnarvon; 1st creation 1643–1709	Extinct
Preceded by Robert Dormer	Baron Dormer; 1643–1709	Succeeded by Rowland Dormer
