= Anna Dormer, Countess of Carnarvon =

English noblewoman

Countess of Carnarvon
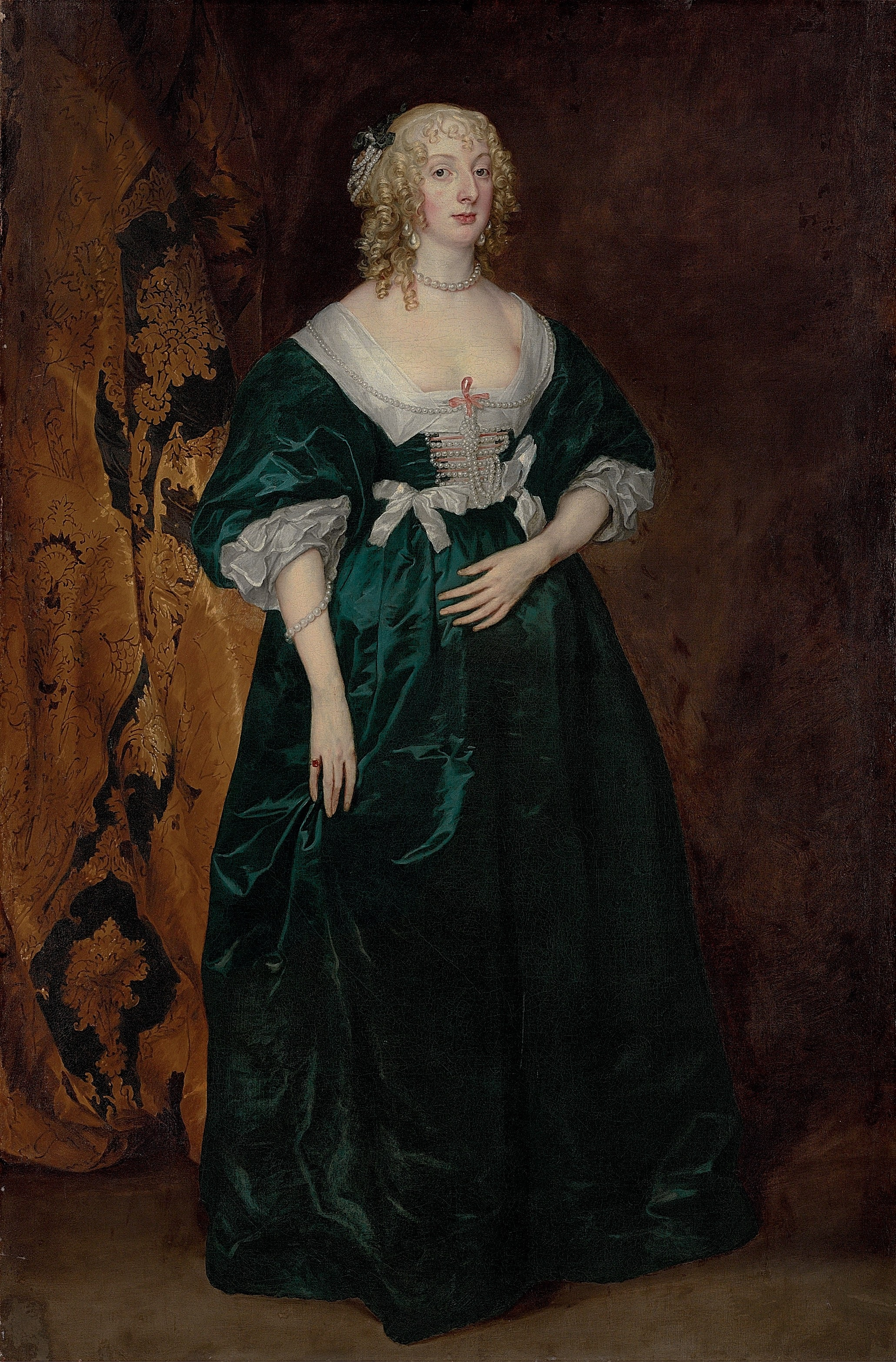
- Anne Sophia, Countess of Carnarvon
- Born: c.1610
- Died: 3 June 1643; England
- Noble family: Herbert, de Vere, Dormer
- Spouse: Robert Dormer, 1st Earl of Carnarvon
- Issue: Charles Dormer, 2nd Earl of Carnarvon
- Father: Philip Herbert, 4th Earl of Pembroke
- Mother: Lady Susan de Vere

Anna Sophie Dormer, Countess of Carnarvon (c. 1610-3 June 1643) (née Lady Anna Sophia Herbert) was an English noblewoman who married Robert Dormer, 1st Earl of Carnarvon (1610 – 20 September 1643) and thereby became Countess of Carnarvon. Dormer received the title Baron Dormer at the age of six and on 2 August 1628, at age 18, he was raised to Viscount Ascott and was created Earl of Carnarvon. Anne Sophia died on 3 June 1643 of smallpox.

== Early life ==
Anna Sophia Herbert was born in around 1610, the daughter of Philip Herbert, 4th Earl of Pembroke and Lady Susan de Vere, the youngest daughter of the Elizabethan courtier, poet, and playwright, Edward de Vere, the 17th Earl of Oxford.

== Marriage and children ==
On 27 February 1625, she was married to Robert Dormer, 1st Earl of Carnarvon, a match which secured her future, as Dormer was one of the wealthiest men in England at the time. The Countess of Carnarvon and her husband were regular performers in masques at court. He was an ardent Royalist and defied his father-in-law in fighting for King Charles I in the English Civil War.

Their son Charles Dormer, 2nd Earl of Carnarvon was born on 25 October 1632, and baptised in St Benet's in London. Charles Dormer was educated at the University of Oxford, where he graduated Master of Arts in 1648.

An anecdote of her can be found in the Strafford Papers (ii, 47). In 1639, she was chosen to perform in the court masque Salmacida Spolia but refused to dance in rehearsals on Sundays on religious grounds. A poem addressed to her is printed in Choice Drollery, 1656.

== Death and legacy ==
Lady Carnarvon died on 3 June 1643 of smallpox.

Lord Carnarvon survived her only by a few months; he was killed at the first Battle of Newbury on 20 September 1643 by a lone trooper who chanced upon him returning from a successful cavalry charge. As he lay dying he was asked if he had one final request of the King. "No", he replied, "in an hour like this, I have no prayer but to the King of Heaven."

Their eldest son, Charles, succeeded to the Earldom on his father's death, and became Hereditary Chief Avenor and Keeper of the King's Hawks. However, Charles Dormer died without a male heir in 1709 and with him the earldom of Carnarvon in the family of Dormer became extinct.

Lady Carnarvon's portrait and that of her eldest son, Charles, was part of the exhibition of Anthony van Dyck's works at the Grosvenor Gallery in 1887.
