= Dormer (surname) =

Dormer or Dörmer is a surname of Gaselic of German possible origins. Notable people with the surname include:

- Albert Dormer (1925–2014), English bridge player, writer and administrator
- Daisy Dormer (born Kezia Beatrice Stockwell; 1883–1947), British music hall performer
- Francis Joseph Dormer (1854–1928), South African journalist and newspaper editor
- Heinz Dörmer (1912–2001), German man who was imprisoned by the Nazis for homosexuality
- Sir Michael Dormer (died 1545), Lord Mayor of London
- Michael Dormer (1937–2021), New Zealand cricketer
- Michael Henry Dashwood Dormer (1935–2012), American visual artist, writer, lyricist and entrepreneur
- Natalie Dormer (born 1982), British actress
- Richard Dormer (born 1969), Northern Irish actor, playwright and screenwriter
- Robert Dormer, 1st Baron Dormer (1551–1616), English peer
- Robert Dormer, 1st Earl of Carnarvon (1610–1643), English peer
- Sir William Dormer (bef. 1514–1575), Tudor politician

== See also ==
- Dormer
- Dorman
- Dorner
