= Elizabeth Stanhope, Countess of Chesterfield (d. 1677) =

English noblewoman

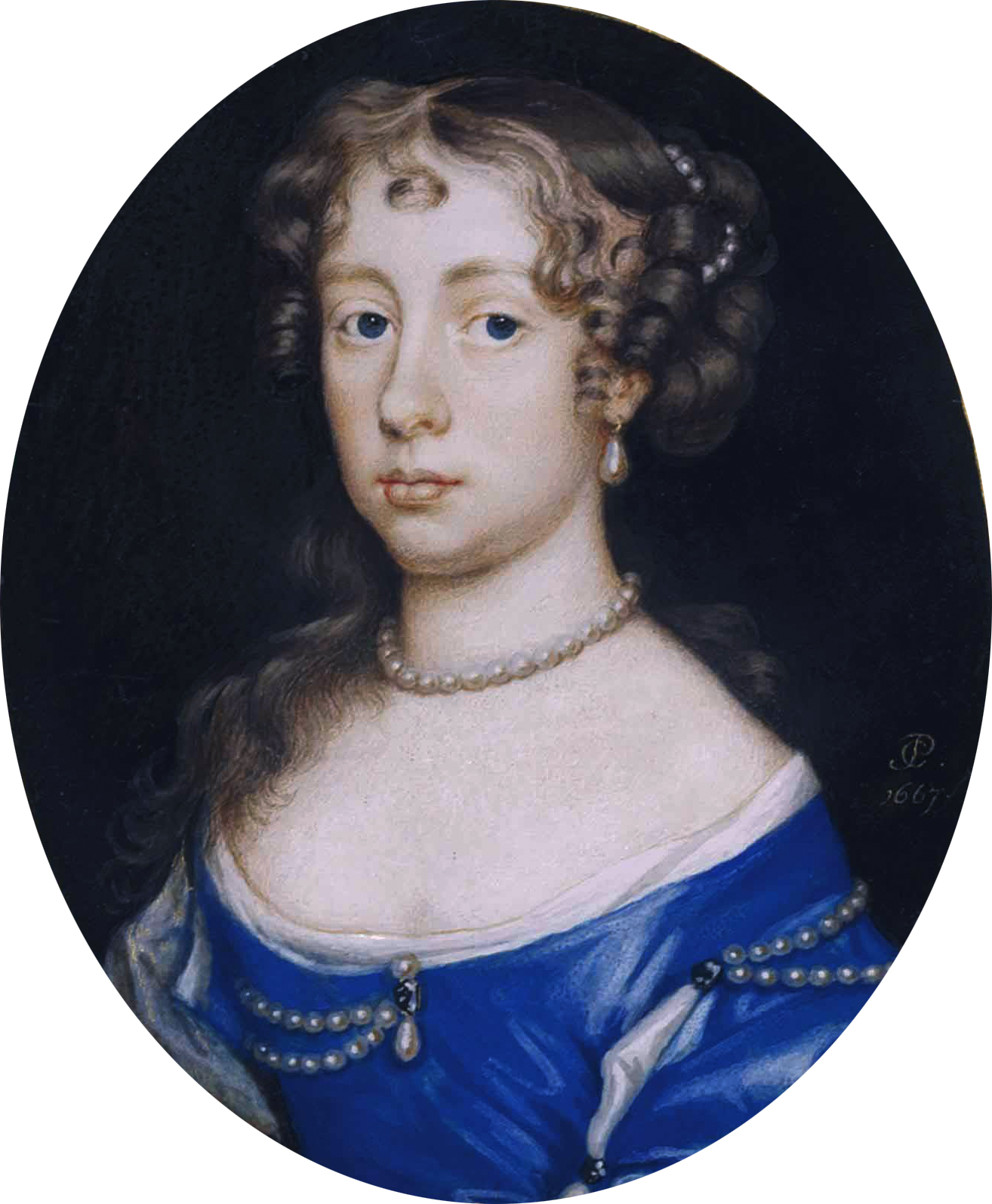
Elizabeth Dormer (Peter Cross, 1667)

Elizabeth Stanhope, Countess of Chesterfield (1658 – 24 October 1677) was the daughter of Charles Dormer, 2nd Earl of Carnarvon and his wife Elizabeth, and the third wife of Philip Stanhope, 2nd Earl of Chesterfield.

She was born Lady Elizabeth Dormer at Ascott House, in Wing, Buckinghamshire. She married the widowed Earl of Chesterfield c1665.

She had four children by the Earl of Chesterfield:

- Lord Charles Stanhope d. 6 Feb 1703/4
- Lady Mary Stanhope+ d. 10 Jan 1703/4
- Lady Catherine Stanhope4 d. 1728
- Philip Stanhope, 3rd Earl of Chesterfield b. 3 Feb 1672/73, d. 27 Jan 1725/26.
