= Salmacida Spolia =

Masque by William Davenant

Salmacida Spolia was the last masque performed at the English Court before the outbreak of the English Civil War. Written by Sir William Davenant, with costumes, sets, and stage effects designed by Inigo Jones and with music by Lewis Richard, it was performed at Whitehall Palace on 21 January 1640.

== Intent ==
In English, the title means "Salmacian spoils," and refers to an ancient Greek legend: a band of barbarians pillaging the Greek city of Halicarnassus in Asia Minor are pacified and civilized by drinking from the fountain of Salmacis. The masque was intended to convey a message of yielding and pacification; Charles I had just ended his eleven-year period of personal rule and called for a new session of parliament. In an effort to create an amicable atmosphere for the coming parliamentary session, several leading aristocratic members of the parliamentary party were cast in the masque, including Francis Russell, 4th Earl of Bedford, and Philip Herbert, 4th Earl of Pembroke. (This effort at political theatre quickly proved useless: the parliament that followed was the famous Short Parliament.)

== Rehearsals ==
Algernon Percy, 10th Earl of Northumberland saw rehearsals in December 1639. He wrote to his sister Dorothy Sidney, Countess of Leicester, disapproving of the cast and commenting that Anna Dormer, Countess of Carnarvon refused to dance on a Sunday because of religious scruples:

The King and Queene have begun to practise their Maske, a companie of worse faces I did never see assembled than the Queene had gotten together upon this occation; not one new woman amongst them. my Lady Carnarvan conditioned before she promised to be of the Maske that it should not be danced upon a Sunday, ... I assure you their Majesties are not less busy now than formerly when you have seen them at the like exercise.

== Overview ==
The masque was unique in that both Charles I and his queen, Henrietta Maria, performed in it; the Queen's mother, Marie de' Medici, was in the audience. In the masque, The King "personated" the role of Philogenes ("lover of the people"), a good but misunderstood ruler. Philogenes endures a fierce tempest that features the spirit of Discord, to reach an ensuing prosperous calm. A chariot descends from the cloudy heavens, carrying the personifications Concord and the Good Genius of Great Britain. The Queen, pregnant at the time, also descends from the heavens, "in a transparent brightness of thin exhalations, such as the gods are feigned to descend in."

A complex anti-masque featured, among other characters, quack doctors offering "cures" that can only make the chaos greater—for example, "Essence of dissimulation to enforce Love" and "An Opiade of the spirit of Muskadine taken in good quantity to bedward, to make one forget his Creditors." The anti-masque figures, as shown in Jones's surviving sketches, were "bizarrely dressed, physically deformed, and even obscene...one of them is equipped with an enormous erect penis...." The King dispels evil influences from a "golden throne surrounded by palm trees and heroic statues."

The masque featured elaborate dancing, and the sophisticated special effects that were Jones's specialty: for example,

"[storm and gale, etc., and:] in the midst was a globe of the Earth, which at an instant falling on fire, was turned into a Fury, her hayre upright, mixt with snakes, her body leane wrinkled and of a swarthy colour [etc.]"

The masque concluded with an idealized cityscape of London, replete with "magnificent buildings," and with another of Jones's famous and stunning cloudscapes, "a heaven opened full of deities."

The royal couple were highly pleased with the masque, and danced it again on the next Shrove Tuesday. The public response, such as there was among the restricted audience, appears to have been less positive, as contemporary witnesses reported more "disorder" among the crowd than usual. An element of negativity in the masque's reception was comprehensible, since it attributes the disorder of the realm to the stubbornness of the King's subjects ("the people's giddy fury"), and hints that the royal power won't always be held in check.

Davenant later adapted aspects of Salmacida Spolia to create his famous The Siege of Rhodes, the "first English opera."

As was often the case, the masque was published in quarto soon after its performance, in this instance by the bookseller Thomas Walkley. It was reprinted in a duodecimo volume in 1750, by William Rufus Chetwood.
