= Elizabeth Capel, Countess of Carnarvon =

Countess of Carnarvon
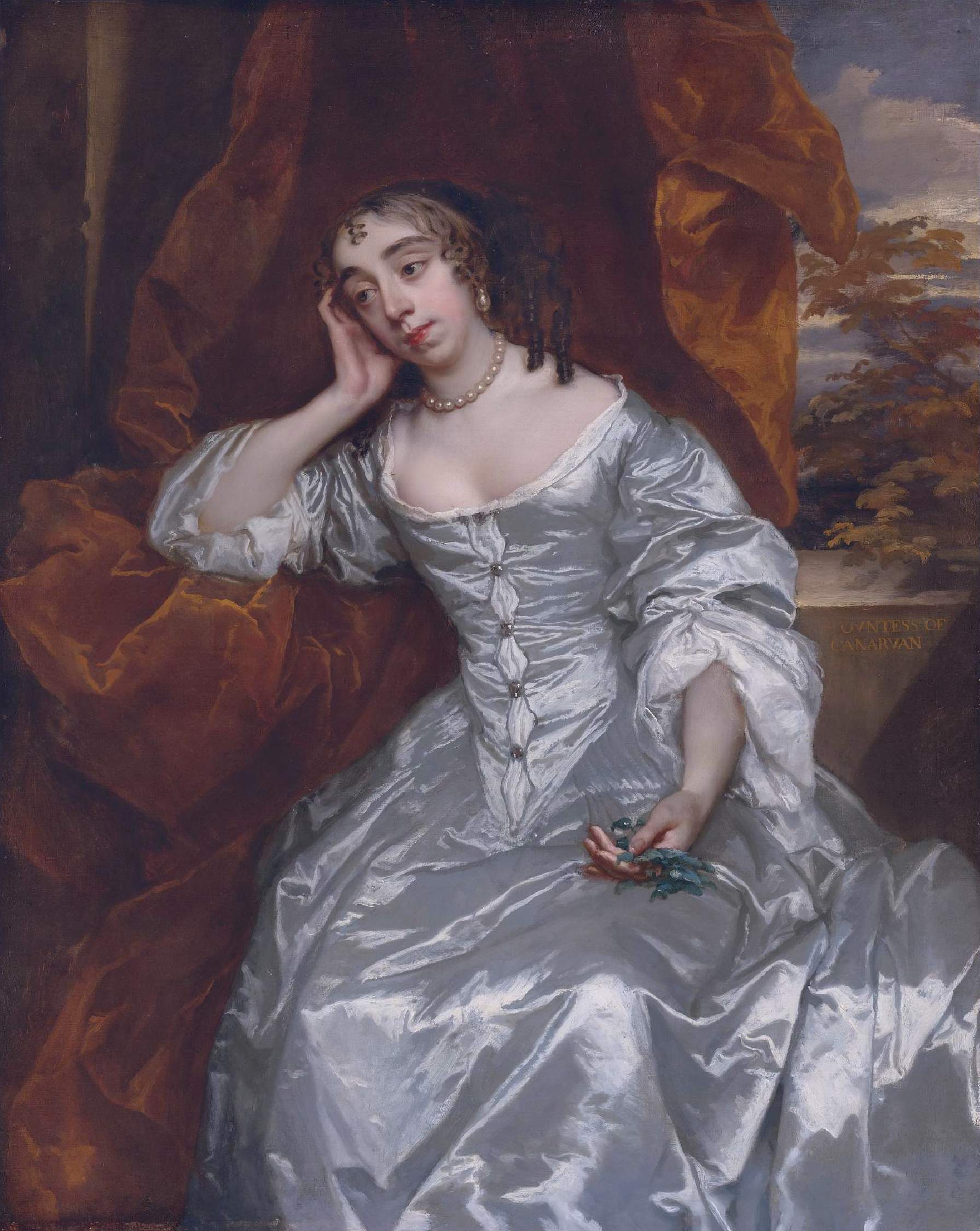
- Portrait by Peter Lely
- Born: 4 June 1633
- Died: 30 July 1678 (aged 45)
- Spouse: Charles Dormer, 2nd Earl of Carnarvon
- Issue: Lady Anna Sophia Dormer; Lady Elizabeth Dormer; Charles Dormer, 3rd Viscount Ascott; Lady Isabella Dormer
- Father: Arthur Capell, 1st Baron Capell of Hadham
- Mother: Elizabeth Morrison

Elizabeth Dorner, Countess of Carnarvon (née Capel or Capell, 1633 – 1678) was an English noblewoman and botanical painter.

== Family ==
She was born on 4 June 1633, one of nine children of Arthur, 1st Baron Capel, and his wife Elizabeth, née Morrison. Her father was executed for his royalist activities in 1649. Before 1653, she married Charles Dormer, 2nd Earl of Carnarvon. They had four surviving children:

- Lady Anna Sophia Dormer
- Lady Elizabeth Dormer, who married Philip Stanhope, 2nd Earl of Chesterfield
- Charles Dormer, 3rd Viscount Ascott
- Lady Isabella Dormer, who married Charles Coote, 3rd Earl of Mountrath.

== Painting ==
=== As sitter ===
During the 1650s, Elizabeth appeared in several portraits by Richard Gibson and court painter Peter Lely. The Capel and Carnarvon families were these Royalist artists' main patrons during the Interregnum. She was then attached to the court of Charles II after the Restoration of the Monarchy.

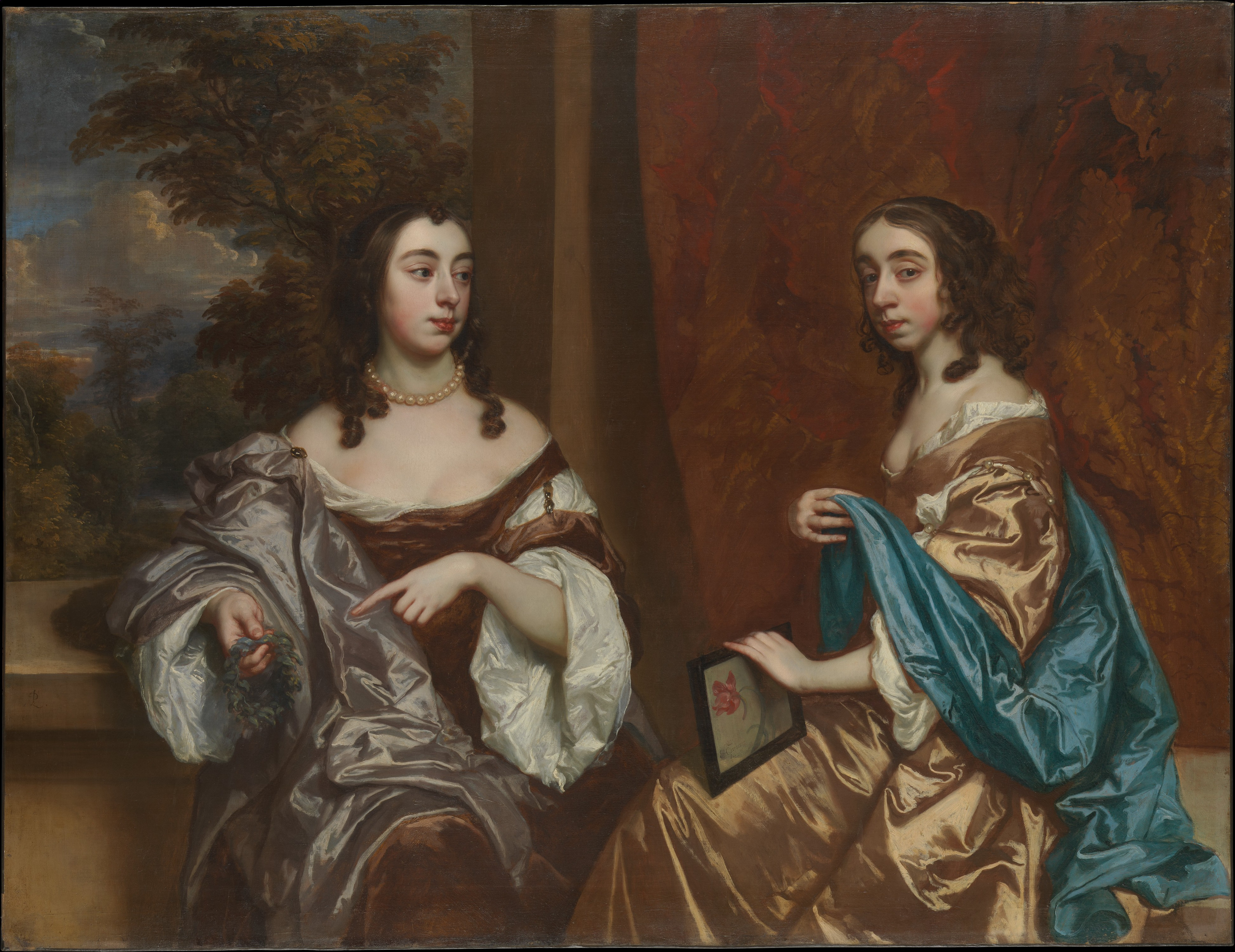
Portrait of Mary and Elizabeth Capel by Peter Lely. Mary holds a wreath of ivy and Elizabeth holds one of her paintings of a tulip

=== As painter ===
She belonged to a botanical family: her brother Henry Capel gardened at the Kew estate and her sister Mary was a noted horticulturalist. She is depicted as a young woman holding one of her botanical paintings in a portrait by Lely. She continued to paint after her marriage, using her families' plant collections, and some of her watercolours are held by the Royal Collection Trust.

She died on 30 July 1678.
