= Arthur Capell, 1st Baron Capell of Hadham =

English politician (1608–1649)

The Right Honorable The Lord Capell of Hadham
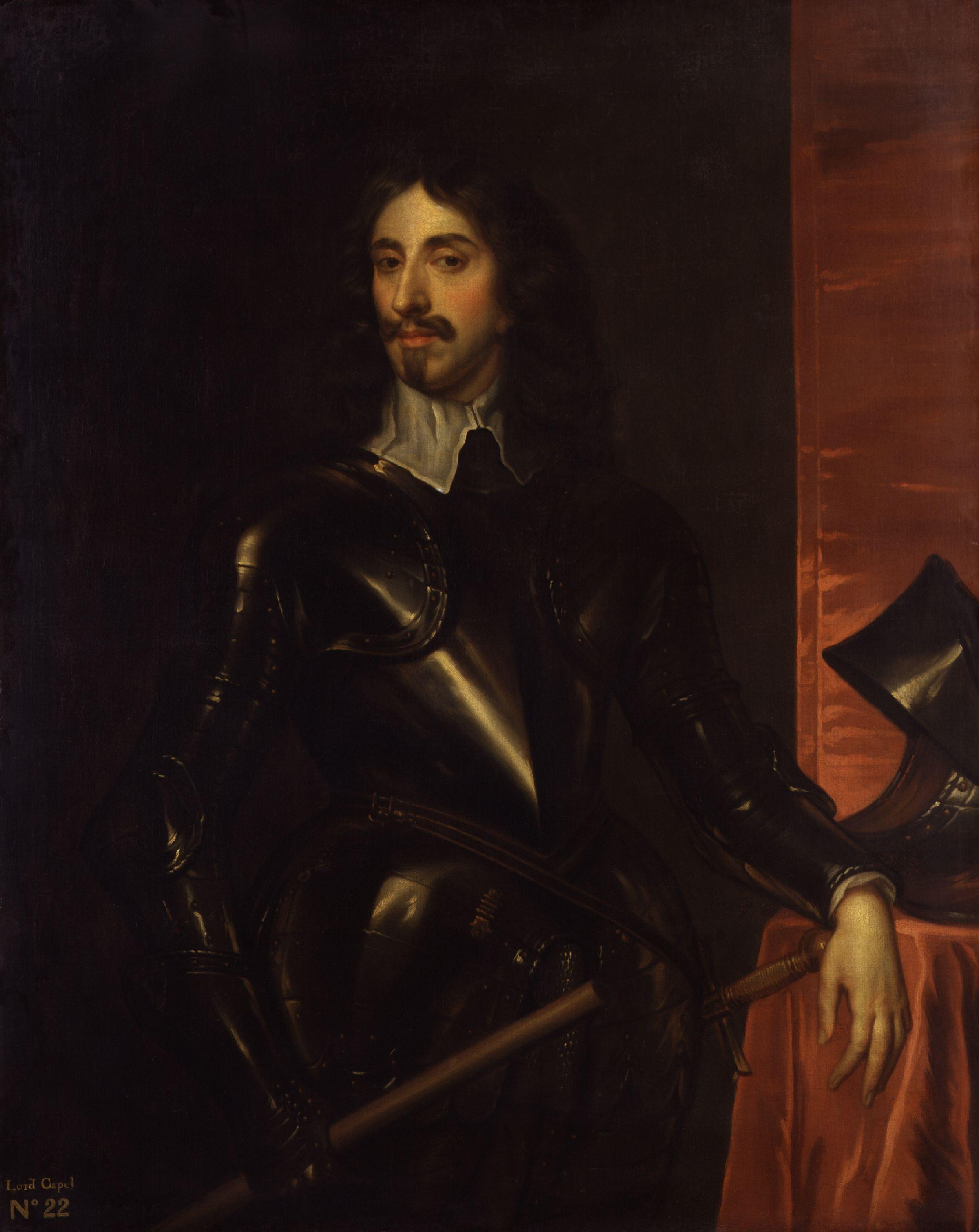

Member of Parliament for Hertfordshire
- In office 1640–1641
- Monarch: Charles I

Personal details
- Born: 20 February 1608 Hadham Hall, Hertfordshire, England
- Died: 9 March 1649 (aged 41) Old Palace Yard, Westminster, England
- Spouse: Elizabeth Morrison
- Relations: Sir Henry Capell (father); Theodosia Montagu (mother)
- Children: Anne Capell-Strangways; Mary Capell, Duchess of Beaufort; Arthur Capell, 1st Earl of Essex; Elizabeth Capell, Countess of Carnarvon; Henry Capell, 1st Baron Capell of Tewkesbury; Charles Capell; Theodosia Capell, Countess of Clarendon
- Education: Queens' College, Cambridge
- Occupation: Royalist army officer and Member of Parliament

Military service
- Allegiance: Royalist
- Rank: Lieutenant-General
- Battles/wars: English Civil War

Arms of Capell: Gules, a lion rampant between three cross-crosslets fitcheé or

Arthur Capell, 1st Baron Capell of Hadham (20 February 1608 – 9 March 1649), of Hadham Hall and Cassiobury House, Watford, both in Hertfordshire, was an English politician who sat in the House of Commons from 1640 until 1641 when he was raised to the peerage as Baron Capell. He supported the Royalist cause in the Civil War and was executed on the orders of parliament in 1649.

== Life ==
Capell was the only son of Sir Henry Capell, of Rayne Hall, Essex,(who was the grandson of Henry Capell) and his wife Theodosia Montagu, daughter of Sir Edward Montagu of Boughton House, Northamptonshire. He was educated at Queens' College, Cambridge.

In April 1640, he was elected Member of Parliament for Hertfordshire in the Short Parliament, and was re-elected MP for Hertfordshire for the Long Parliament in November 1640. At first, he supported the opposition of the arbitrary government of King Charles I of England. On 5 December 1640, he delivered the "Petition from the county of Hertfordshire", outlining grievances against the King, and continued to criticise the King and the King's advisers right through to the summer of 1641.

In June 1641, in an effort to raise additional revenue, the price of baronies was reduced from £400 to £350, and Capell was raised to the peerage by the title of Baron Capell of Hadham, in the County of Hertford, on 6 August 1641. However, Capell was openly allying himself with the King's cause by early 1642, on which side his sympathies were now engaged.

On the outbreak of the English Civil War, he was appointed lieutenant-general of Shropshire, Cheshire, and North Wales, where he rendered useful military services, and was later made one of the Councillors of Prince Charles Stewart (who later became King Charles II of England), as well as a commissioner at the Treaty of Uxbridge in 1645. He attended the Queen, Henrietta Maria of France (the wife of King Charles I), in her flight to France in 1646, but disapproved of her son Prince Charles's journey thither, and afterwards retired to Jersey; later, he subsequently aided in the King's escape to the Isle of Wight.

Capell was one of the chief Royalist leaders in the second Civil War, but met with no success, and on 27 August 1648, together with Earl of Norwich, he surrendered to Lord Fairfax at Colchester, on the promise of quarter for life.

This assurance was afterwards interpreted as not binding the civil authorities, and his fate for some time hung in the balance. He succeeded in escaping from the Tower of London, wading the moat once he had got over the walls, only to be betrayed by a Thames waterman, who had been engaged to row him from a hiding place at the Temple to one in Lambeth. He was again captured and was condemned to death by parliament, on 8 March 1649, and beheaded together with the Duke of Hamilton and the Earl of Holland. The beheadings were carried out by Richard Brandon in his capacity as the common hangman of London.

One of Lord Capell's last requests was for his heart to be buried with the body of King Charles I, and after his execution, Capell's heart was preserved in a silver box.

The silver box was kept in the custody of the Bishop of Winchester, and was later presented, by the Bishop, to King Charles II. In 1703, a heart in a silver box was found at Hadham Hall, suggesting that the King sent the heart to Capell's son. It was later taken to Cassiobury, but since the dissolution and sale of the Cassiobury estate, the whereabouts of Capell's heart are now unknown. A memorial stone to Lord Capell was erected at St Cecelia's Church in Little Hadham, Hertfordshire.

== Works ==
Capell wrote Daily Observations or Meditations: Divine, Morall, published with some of his letters in 1654, and reprinted, with a short life of the author, under the title Excellent Contemplations, in 1683.

== Marriage and children ==
On 28 November 1627, Capell married Elizabeth Morrison, daughter and sole heiress of Sir Charles Morrison of Cassiobury, Hertfordshire, and Mary Hicks, who brought the Cassiobury estate, including Cassiobury House, into his family, making him one of the richest men in England. His lands were scattered across ten counties and brought him a reputed annual income of £7,000. By his wife, he had four daughters and five sons, including:

- Anne Capell, wife of John Strangways, MP.
- Mary Capell (1630–1715), wife of Henry Somerset, 1st Duke of Beaufort.
- Arthur Capell, 1st Earl of Essex (1631–1683), eldest son and heir, created Earl of Essex at the Restoration. When the Earl, facing charges of treason, committed suicide in 1683, King Charles II remarked that he should have known his life would be spared, for "his father died for mine".
- Elizabeth Capell (1633–1678), wife of Charles Dormer, 2nd Earl of Carnarvon.
- Henry Capell, 1st Baron Capell of Tewkesbury (1638–1696), a politician and founder of the Royal Botanic Gardens at Kew.
- Charles Capell (died 1657)
- Theodosia Capell (died 1661), wife of Henry Hyde, 2nd Earl of Clarendon.

== Gallery ==
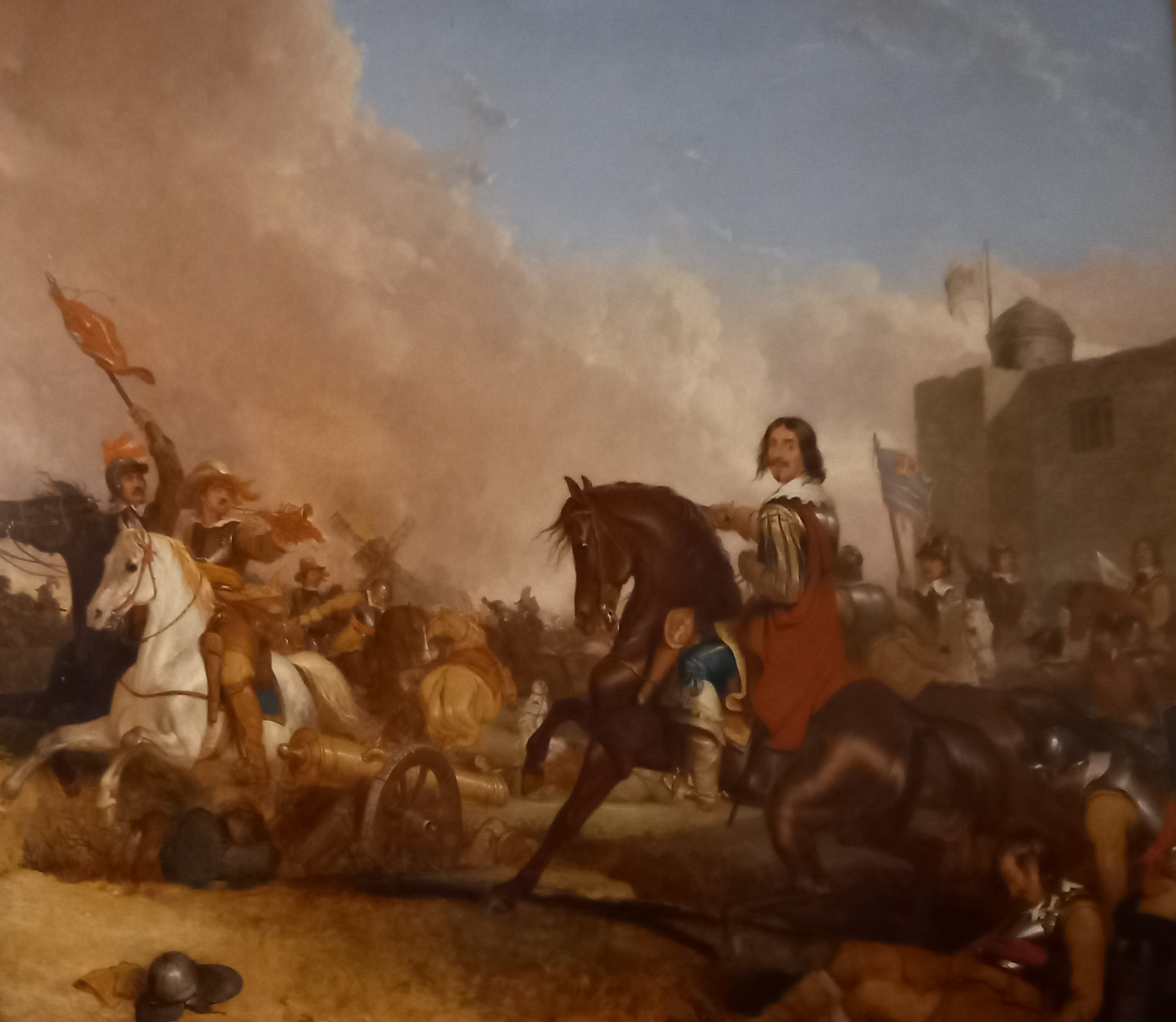
Lord Cappell fighting at the Siege of Colchester in 1648, by Abraham Cooper (1787–1868).

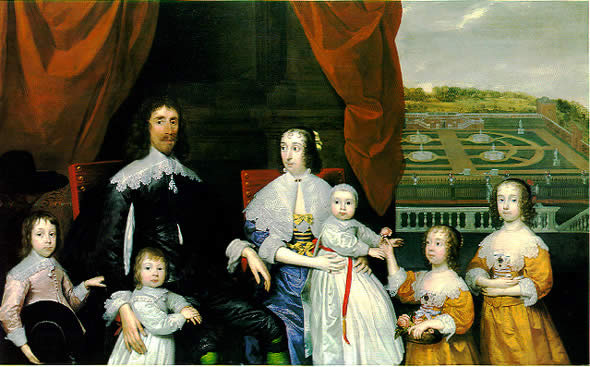
"Arthur Capell, 1st Baron Capell of Hadham, and his Family", by Cornelius Johnson, at the National Portrait Gallery, London.

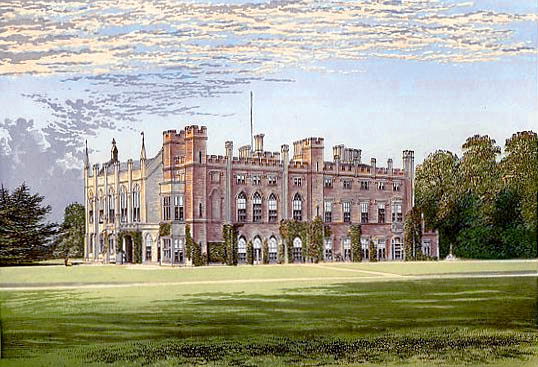
Cassiobury House, Hertfordshire, in 1888.

== Notes ==
Parliament of England
Vacant Parliament suspended since 1629	Member of Parliament for Hertfordshire; 1640–1641; With: Sir William Lytton	Succeeded by Sir William Lytton; Sir Thomas Dacres
Peerage of England
New creation	Baron Capell of Hadham; 1641–1649	Succeeded by Arthur Capell
