= All Saints' Church, Wing =

Church in Wing, Buckinghamshire, England

Coordinates: 51°53′41.5″N 0°43′20″W

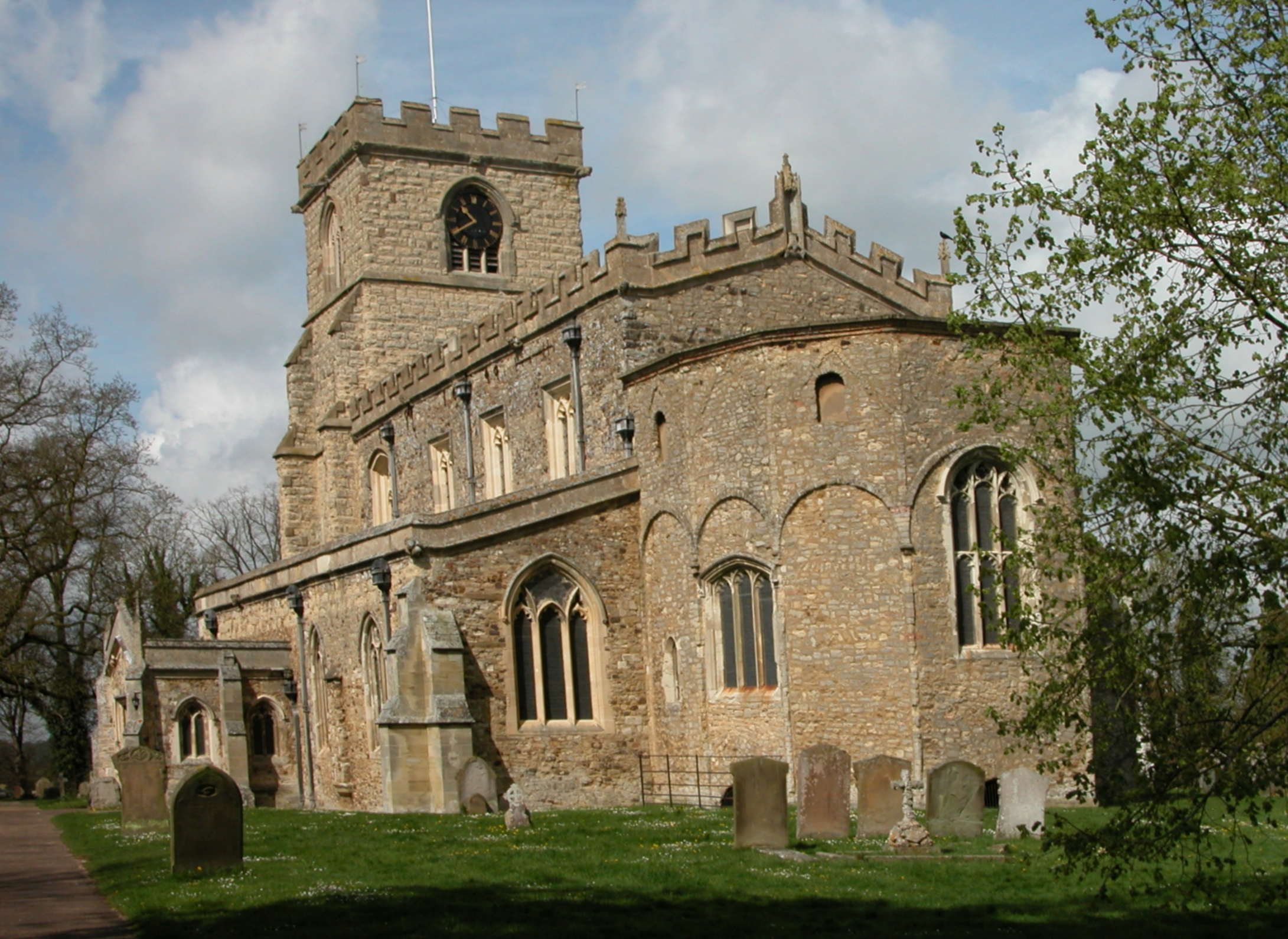
All Saints' Church, Wing

All Saints' Church in Wing, Buckinghamshire, is a Grade I listed parish church. Its masonry was largely built in the 8th to 11th centuries during the Anglo-Saxon period, making it one of the oldest surviving churches in England.

Wing is located 5 km southwest of Leighton Buzzard and 12 km northeast of Aylesbury. The church itself is located on the outskirts west of the town centre.

The church was the location of a music video of Libera.

== History ==
The history of Wing dates back to the 7th or 8th century; the place name originally meant "The Settlement of Withun's People". The first missionaries appeared at the beginning of the second half of the 7th century and the region was Christianized from Aylesbury. The first mention of Wing comes from the period between 966 and 975. The first written mention of the church comes shortly after the Norman Conquest in 1066 and concerned a priest named Goldric, who remained in the possession of the church and his land even after the Norman Conquest.

== Anglo-Saxon era ==
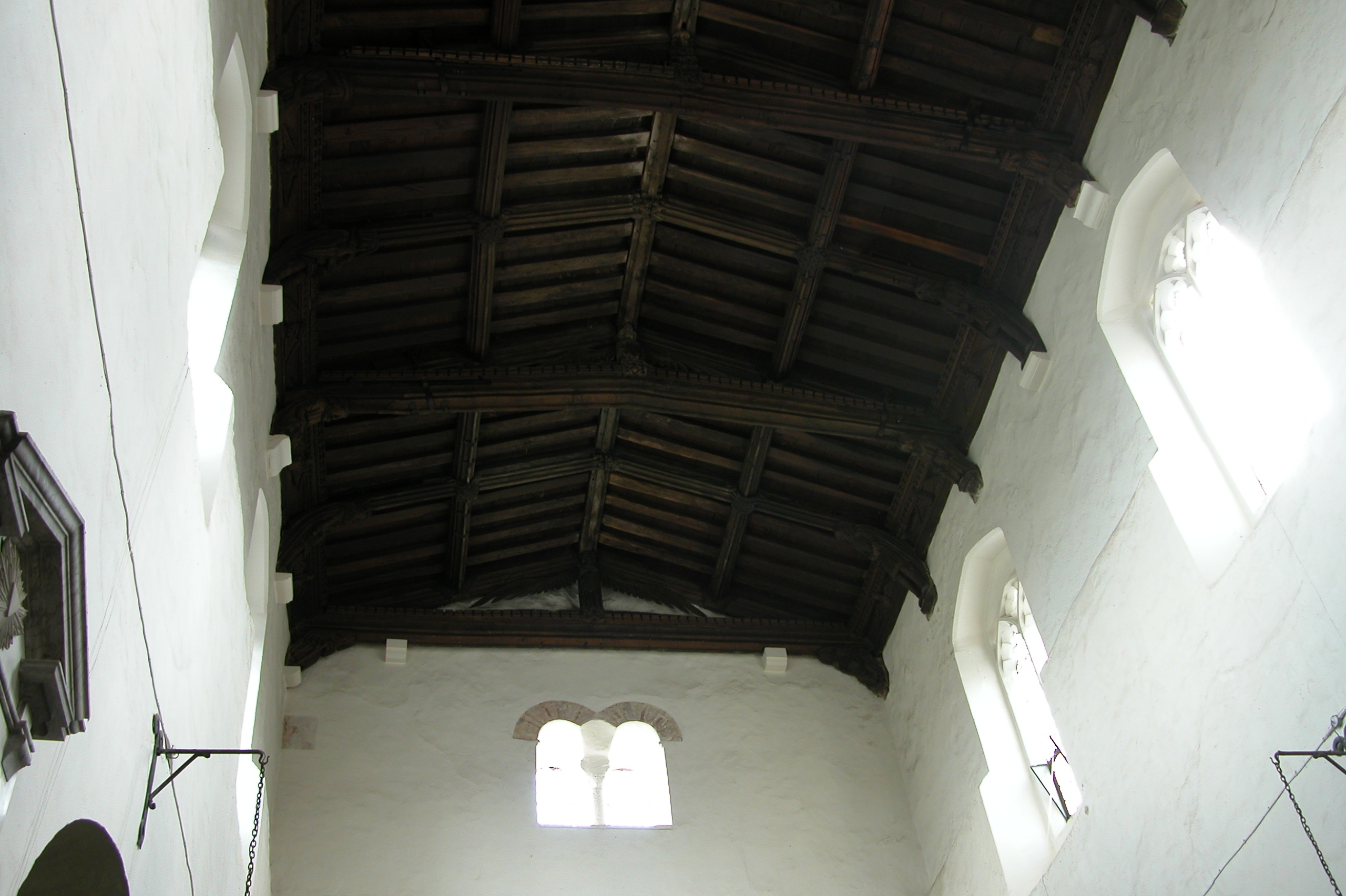
Anglo-Saxon window on the east wall

Parts of the church preserved from Anglo-Saxon times are the apse and the underlying crypt, the north wall of the church and the pillars. The crypt and the apse above it come from different periods: The oldest part, three niches and windows in the crypt, are from the eighth century. The apse above dates back to the ninth century and is one of the finest examples of ninth-century architecture and the only fully preserved Anglo-Saxon apse in England. From the Anglo-Saxon period also comes the 10.6 metre high three-nave church with the exception of the outer wall of the southern aisle. The triumphal arch between the apse and the nave probably dates from the time of the first renovation in the 9th century. The only Anglo-Saxon window is in the wall of the eastern gable above the choir.

== From the Norman Conquest to the Reformation ==
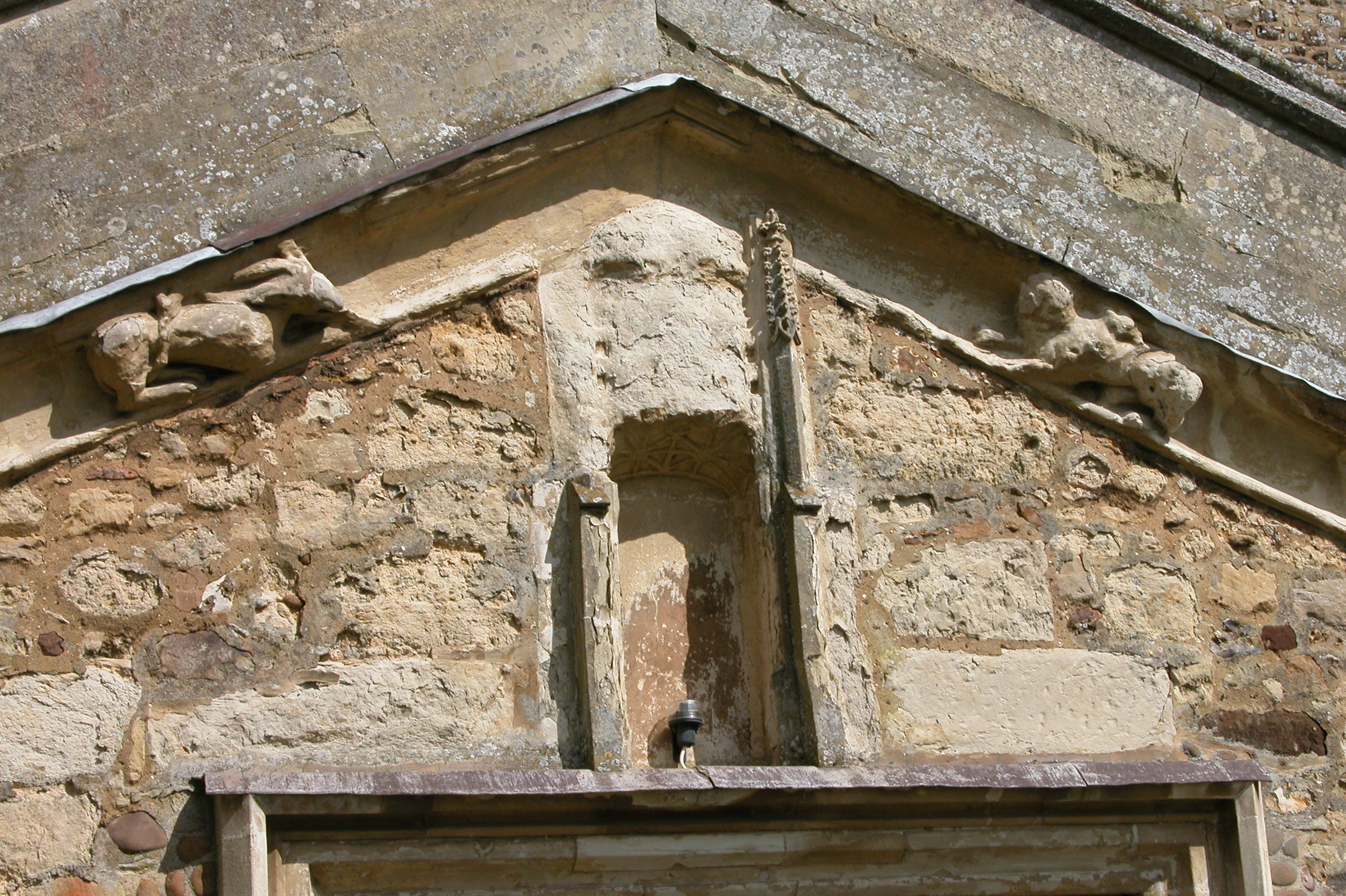
Gable above the southern entrance

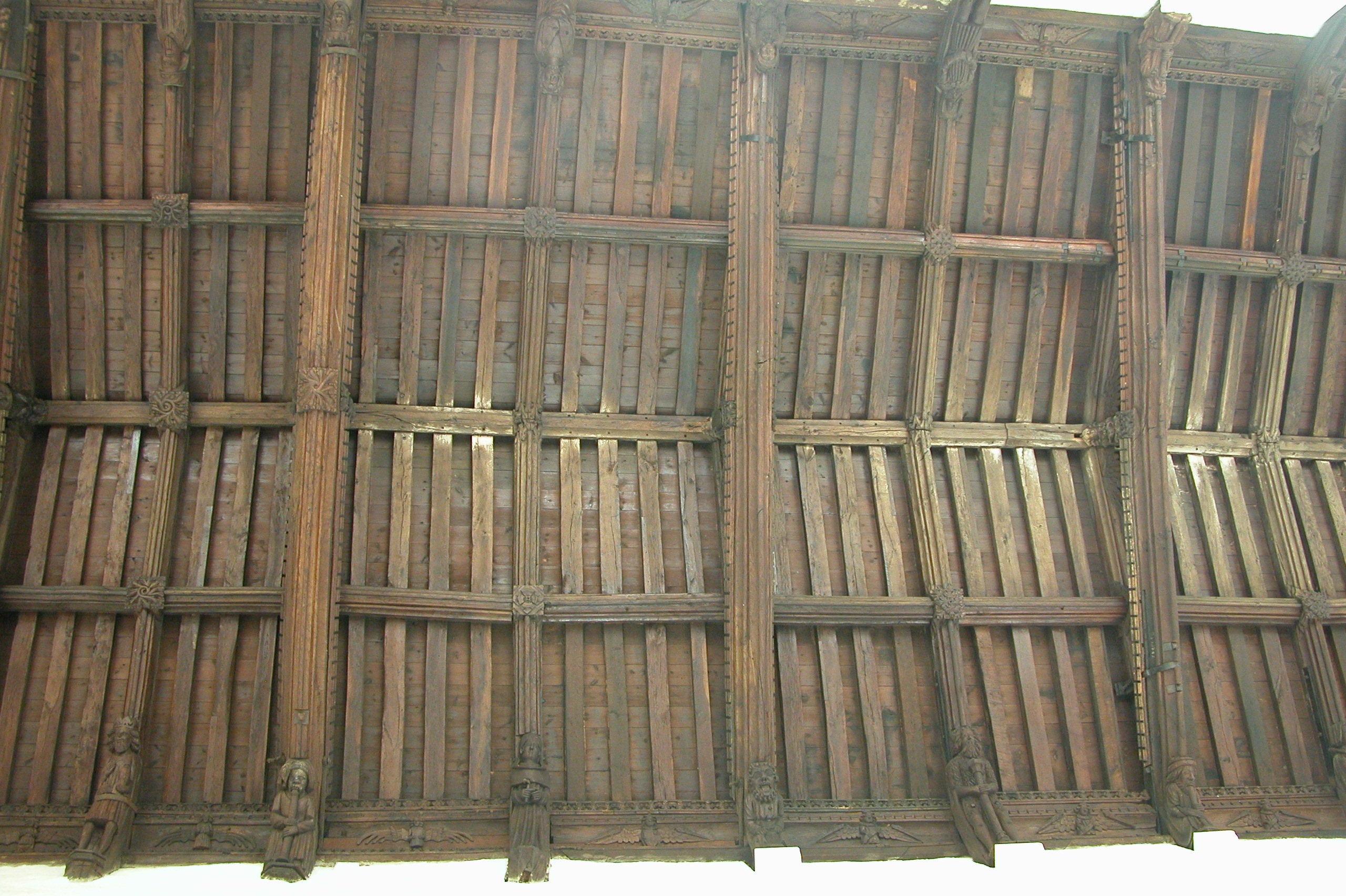
Ceiling in nave

After the Norman conquest of England in 1066, oversight of the church was given to the Benedictine monastery of St. Nicholas in Angers, possibly in the hope that they would establish a priory. However, action was limited to the hiring of a sexton to collect revenues. From 1216, the church's revenues were used to pay for the position of a vicar and from that time the church had the status of a parish church.

In 1416, as a consequence of the Hundred Years War between England and France, the church passed to the Priory of St. Mary de Pre at St Albans. From the middle of the 13th century until the end of the 15th century, the preservation of the church was the responsibility of the secular Lord of Wing and Ascott, who acted as patron of the church.

The church underwent changes in the so-called Decorated Style especially in the first half of the 14th century until the year of plague in 1329. The largest structural changes to the structure of the church took place in the 15th century in the Perpendicular style. The most striking completion of the 15th century was the construction of the massive bell tower, a landmark visible from a great distance. Six bells hang in the tower, four of them dating from the 17th century. They were cast between 1638 and 1654 by the "Knight family's bell foundry" in Reading. The oak bell chair dates from 1654.

From the 14th century come several glass windows, including a coronation of Mary. From 14th and 15th century, respectively, originate the two entrance buildings in the south and north of the church as well as the doorways in them. The doorway in the southern entrance are decorated with coats of arms, lions and other symbols associated with the patron saints of the church. Also from the 15th century is the baptismal font still in use today. The most important work of art left in the church by the 15th century is the wooden ceiling. Below the gable is a series of excellently carved angels with outstretched wings. The edge of the ceiling is decorated by a variety of figures such as kings, queens, musicians and devils.

== The church in the post-Reformation period ==
The Reformation in England began in about 1530 when Henry VIII separated the English Church from the papacy. Significant for Wing was the abolition of the monasteries, since 1528, the Priory of St. Mary de Pre, to which Wing still belonged, was dissolved. The rights of the Priory were acquired by Robert Dormer, 1st Baron Dormer. The Dormers lived in the Manor of Ascott Hall on the outskirts of Wing, acquired the title Earl of Carnarvon in 1628 and were Wing's most important family until the beginning of the 18th century. Diverse members of the Dormer family are buried in the church, mainly at the eastern end of the northern aisle. Particularly impressive are the tombs for Sir Robert Dormer (died 1552), Sir William Dormer (died 1575) and family and Robert Dormer, 1st Baron Dormer (died 1616) and family.

The church is home to a series of 19th-century stained glass windows and a Walker organ dating from 1864, placed in 2002 on a new gallery in the base of the tower.

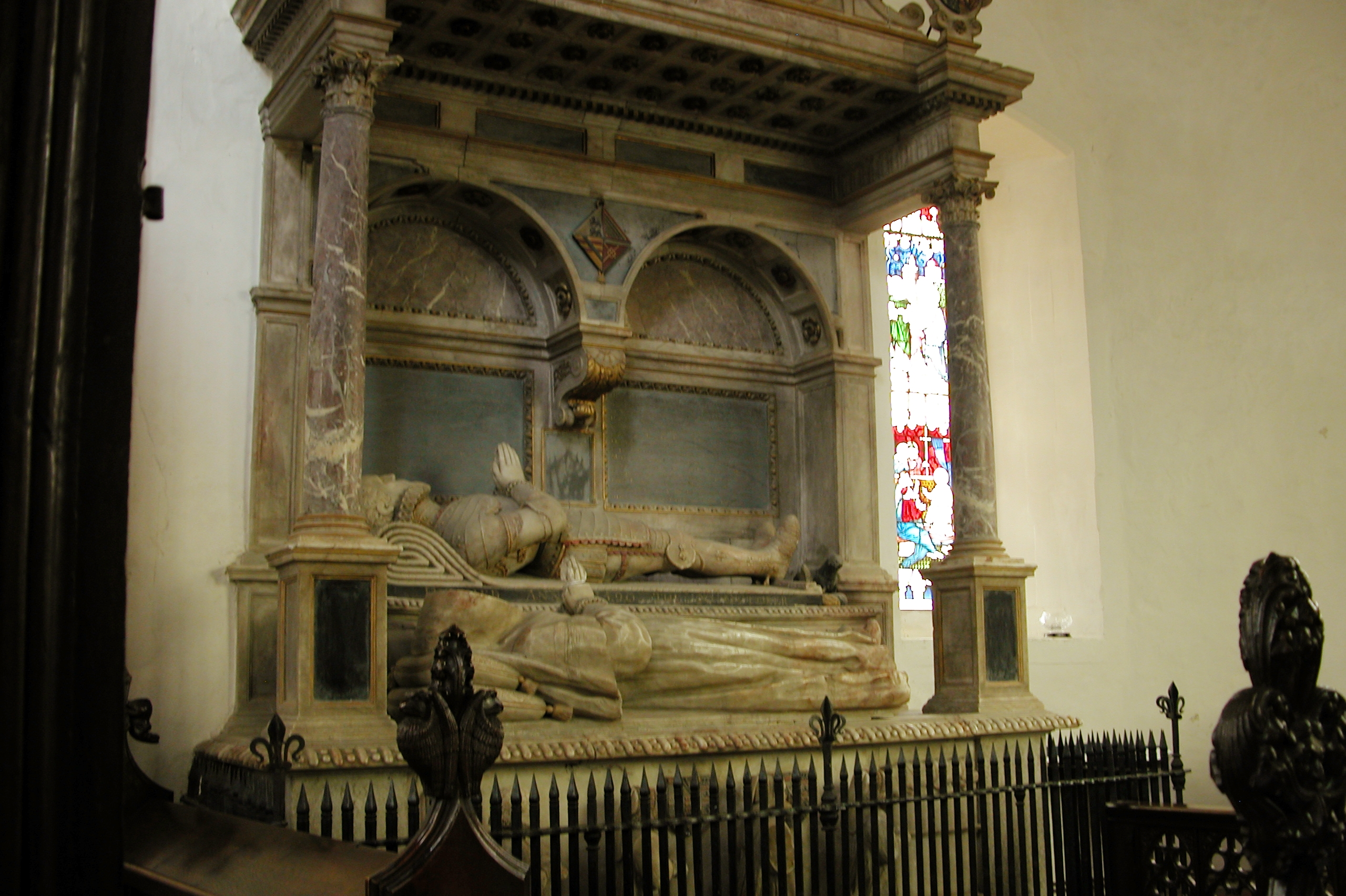
Tomb of Sir William Dormer

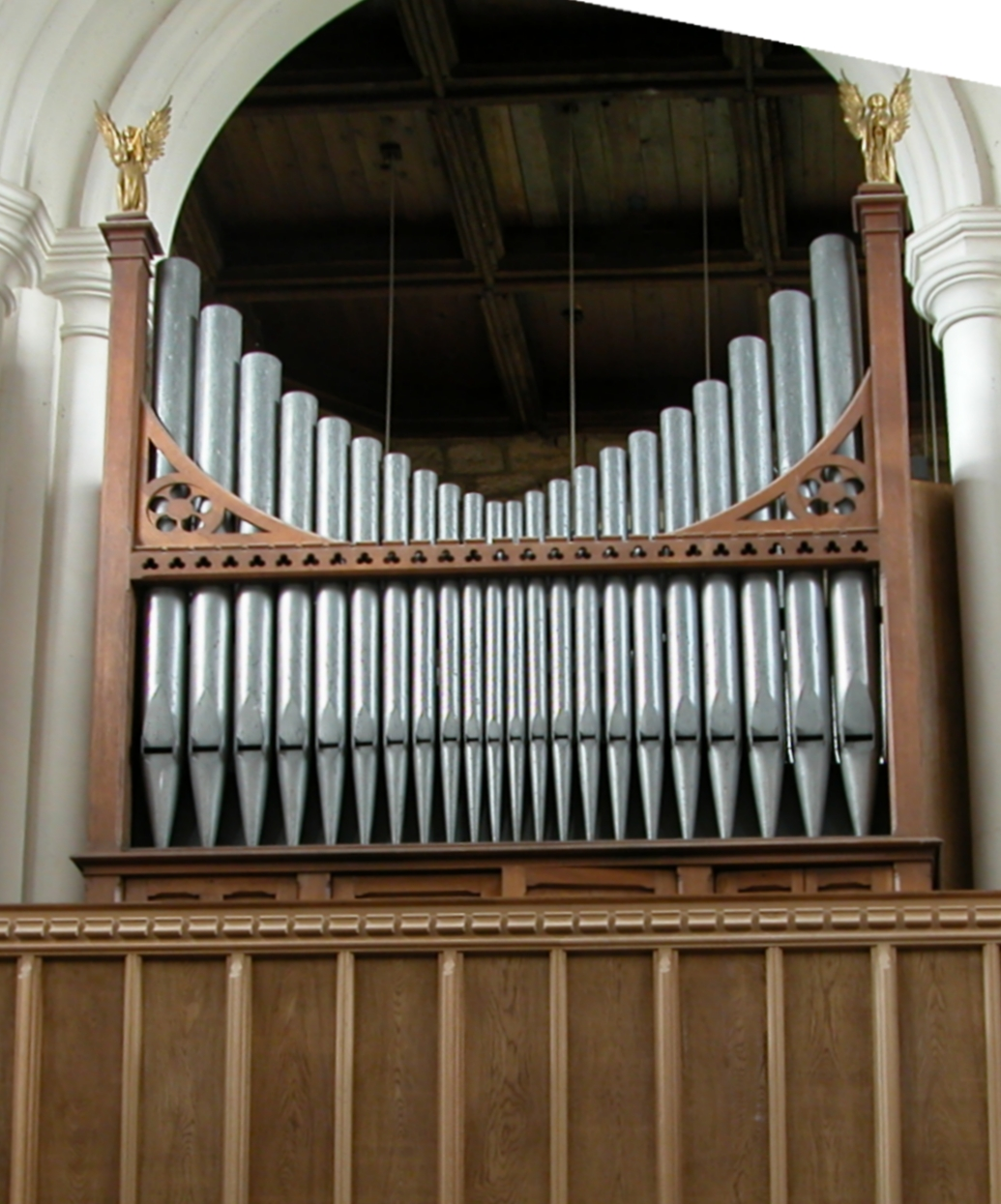
Organ

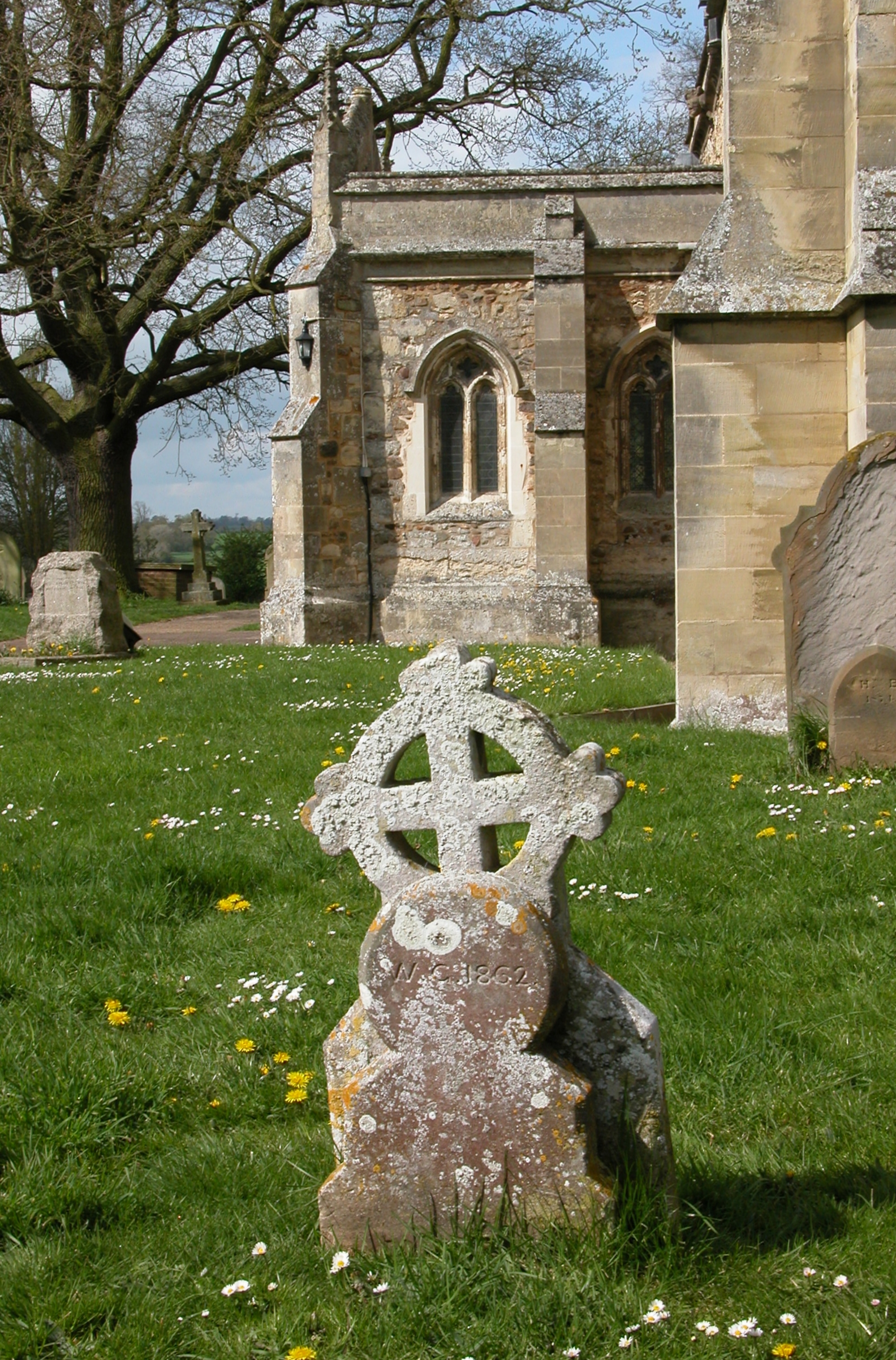
Churchyard

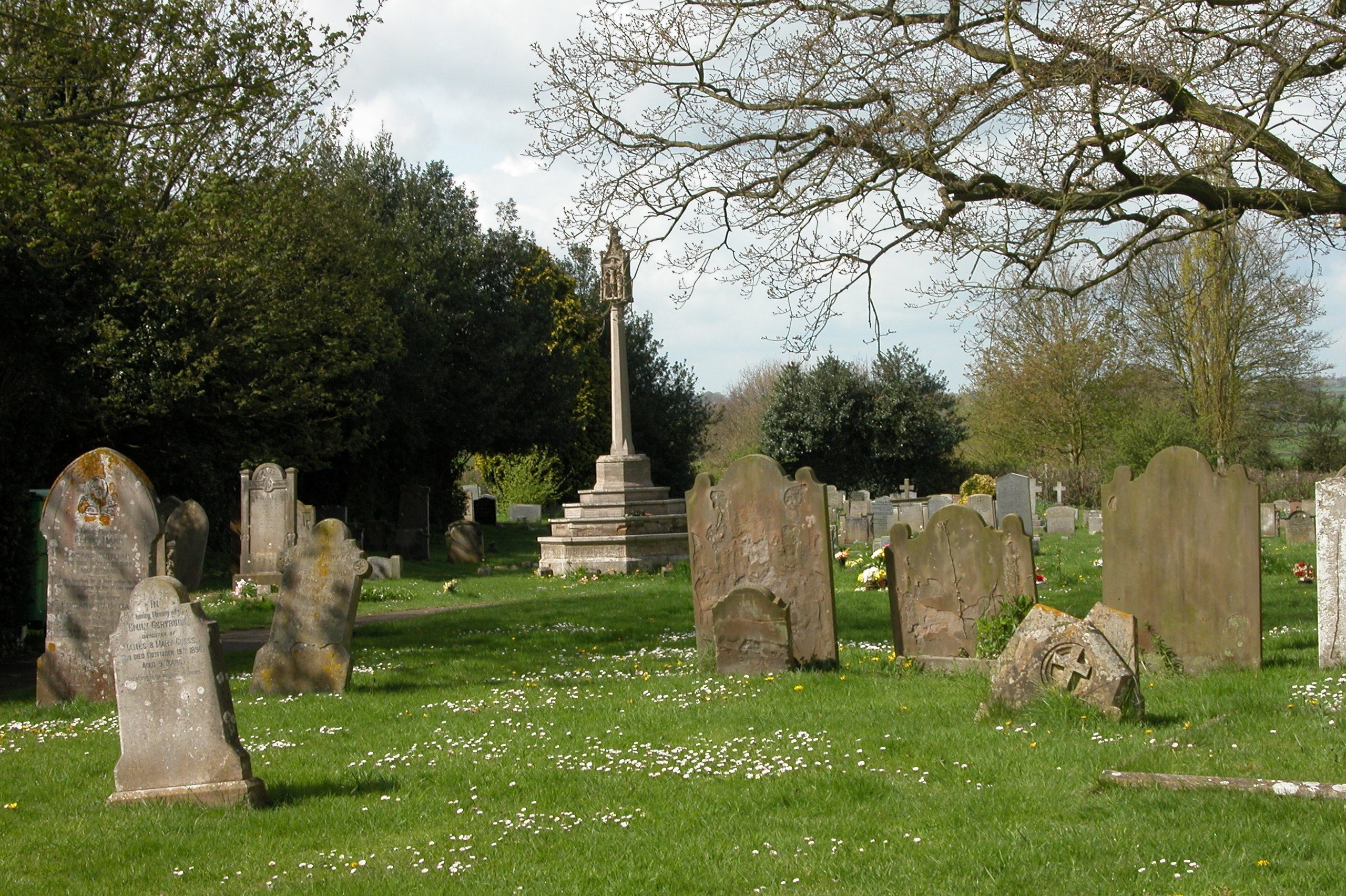
Churchyard
