= Robert Dormer, 1st Baron Dormer =

English peer

Sir Robert Dormer of Wing, 1st Baronet, 1st Baron Dormer of Wing [or Wenge] (26 January 1551 – 8 November 1616) was a 17th-century English peer.

== Life ==
Dormer was the only surviving son of Sir William Dormer and his second wife, Dorothy Pelham (née Catesby). He studied at Gray's Inn in 1567 and obtained a B.A. from Oxford University in 1569.

In 1575, Dormer succeeded to the considerable lands and estate of his father in Buckinghamshire and elsewhere, together with a fortune estimated by the Spanish ambassador to amount to 100,000 ducats. Dormer became a Justice of the Peace in 1577. He served as High Sheriff of Buckinghamshire in 1584 and was knighted in 1591. He was returned as Member of Parliament for Tregony in 1571 and for Buckinghamshire in 1593.

In June 1615, he was created a baronet, of Wing (or Wenge). Only a few weeks later he was raised to the peerage as Baron Dormer, of Wing [or Wenge] in the County of Buckingham.

== Family ==
Dormer married Elizabeth Browne, daughter of Anthony Browne, 1st Viscount Montagu, by whom he had six sons and three daughters. Dormer was a brother-in-law of Henry Wriothesley, 2nd Earl of Southampton, who was married to Elizabeth's sister, Mary. His half-sister, Jane, married the Spanish Ambassador, Gómez Suárez de Figueroa y Córdoba, 1st Duke of Feria.

His paternal grandmother, Jane Newdigate, was the sister of the Carthusian martyr, Sebastian Newdigate, but both Dormer and his father appear to have conformed to the established church. Nonetheless, Dormer held strong Catholic sympathies as so many of his relatives remained Catholic. Sir William Dormer was a friend of the influential Francis Russell, 2nd Earl of Bedford, whose patronage seems to have extended to William's son, Robert, and shielded the family somewhat from close scrutiny under the Penal laws despite the fact that Robert had married into the Catholic Montague family.

His daughter, Dorothy, married Sir Henry Huddleston, of Sawston Hall, noted for a number of priest holes.

== Death ==
Lord Dormer died on 18 November 1616, aged 65, and was interred at All Saints' Church, Wing, where there is an impressive monument to his memory. He was succeeded in his titles by his grandson Robert, who was created Earl of Carnarvon in 1628.

== Sources ==
- Kidd, Charles, Williamson, David (editors). Debrett's Peerage and Baronetage (1990 edition). New York: St Martin's Press, 1990,

Political offices
Preceded by William Hawtrey	High Sheriff of Buckinghamshire; 1584–1585	Succeeded by Edward Bulstrode
Peerage of England
New creation	Baron Dormer; 1615–1616	Succeeded by Robert Dormer
Baronetage of England
New creation	Baronet (of Wenge); 1615–1616	Succeeded by Robert Dormer
