= Robert Dormer, 1st Earl of Carnarvon =

English peer

The Earl of Carnarvon
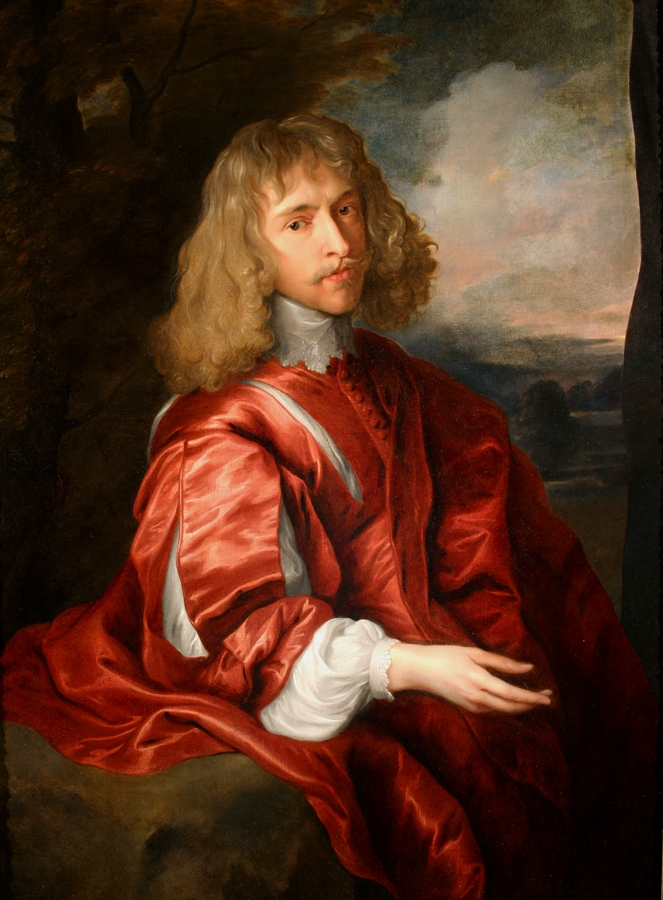
- Robert Dormer, 1st Earl of Carnarvon, c.1630, by Anthony van Dyck
- Born: c.1610
- Died: 20 September 1643; Battle of Newbury, Berkshire, England
- Buried: Wing, Buckinghamshire, England
- Spouse: Lady Anna Sophie Herbert
- Issue: Charles Dormer, 2nd Earl of Carnarvon
- Father: Sir William Dormer
- Mother: Alice Molyneux

Arms of Dormer: Azure, ten billets or 4,3,2,1 issuant from a chief of the second a demi-lion rampant sable langued gules

Sir Robert Dormer of Wing, 2nd Baronet, 1st Earl of Carnarvon, 1st Viscount Ascott, 2nd Baron Dormer of Wing (c. 1610 – 20 September 1643) was an English peer. He was the son of Sir William Dormer, and thus a grandson of Robert Dormer, 1st Baron Dormer. His mother was Alice Molyneux, daughter of Sir Richard Molyneux, 1st Baronet, and Frances Gerard. Dormer received the title Baron Dormer at the age of six and on 2 August 1628, at age 18, he was raised to Viscount Ascott and was created Earl of Carnarvon.

== Early life ==
At age six, Dormer was left a ward to the King. His father had left him a rich peer at an early age. The King then sold Dormer's wardship to Philip Herbert, then Earl of Montgomery, for £4000. Dormer had been brought up as a Catholic and would become a high-living Catholic courtier, in danger, infuriating to hard-line Parliamentarians. He was educated at Eton College and Exeter College, Oxford, where he matriculated in 1624, and was created MA in 1627 and DCL in 1642. He was, according to the seventeenth-century biographer David Lloyd, "extreamly wild in his youth", and addicted to gambling and hunting. He and his wife are recorded as regular performers in masques at court. He was an ardent Royalist and defying his father-in-law he fought for King Charles I in the English Civil War.

King James I was entertained at Ascott Park by his mother, Anne, Lady Dormer, in 1620. Anne of Denmark had visited in 1612.

== Marriage, career, and later years ==
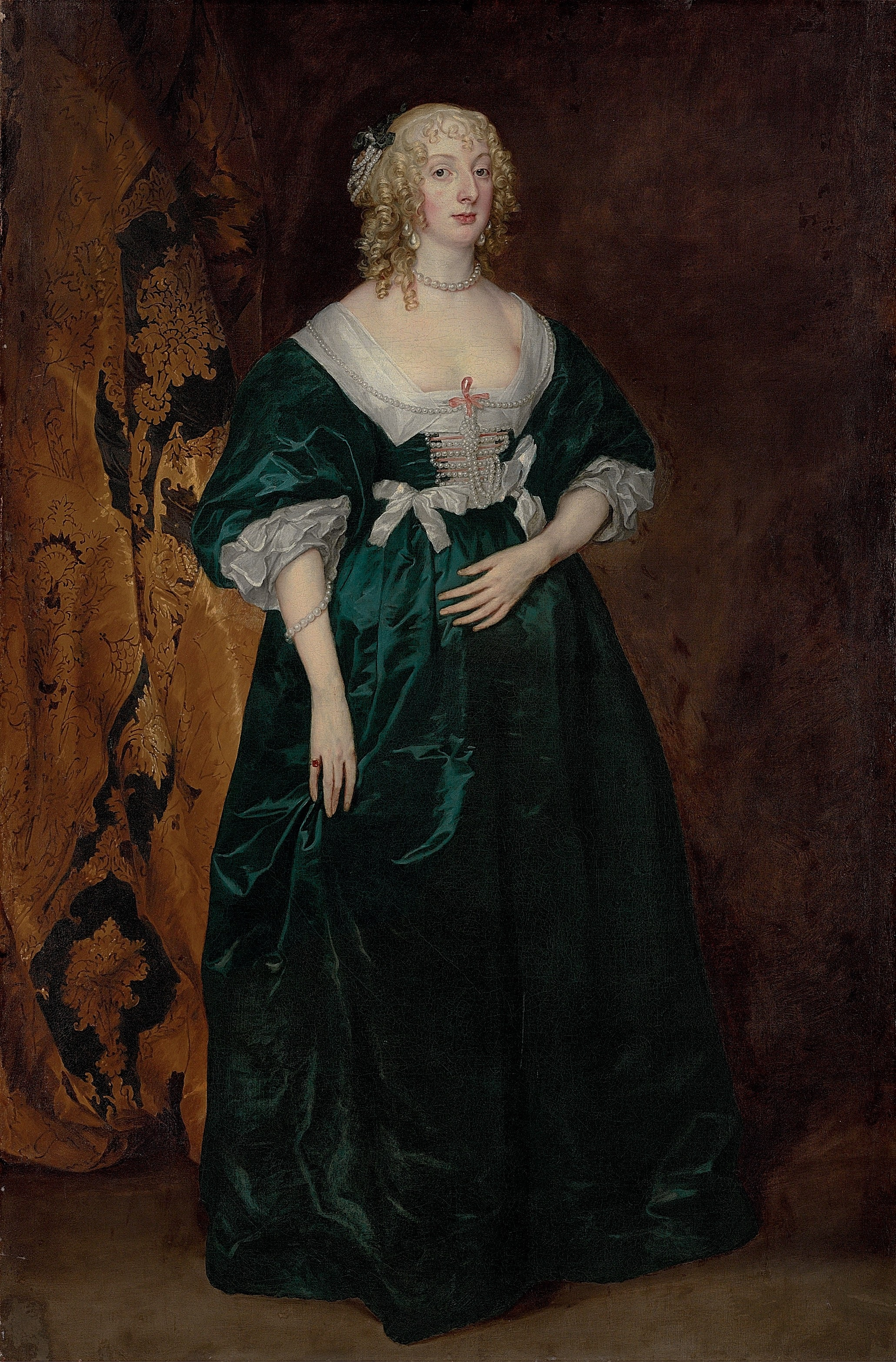
Anne Sophia Herbert, wife of Robert Dormer, 1st Earl of Carnarvon. Portrait by Anthony van Dyck

On 27 February 1625, at the age of fifteen, he was married to his guardian's daughter, Lady Anna Sophie Herbert (d. 1643), which secured her future as Dormer was one of the wealthiest men in England at the time. Anna was the daughter of Philip Herbert, 4th Earl of Pembroke and Lady Susan de Vere, the youngest daughter of the Elizabethan courtier, poet, and playwright, Edward de Vere, the 17th Earl of Oxford, the Oxfordians' William Shakespeare.

On 2 June 1641, he was appointed Lord-Lieutenant of Buckinghamshire. In 1642, he joined the king at York and was one of the peers who signed the declaration of 13 June, agreeing to stand by the king, and the further declaration of 15 June, disavowing the king's alleged intention to make war against Parliament.

Lady Carnarvon died on 3 June 1643 of smallpox. Anecdotes of her are to be found in the Strafford Papers (ii, 47) and the Sydney Papers (ii, 621) and a poem addressed to her is printed in Choice Drollery, 1656. Her portrait and that of her eldest son, Charles, were part of the exhibition of Anthony van Dyck's works at the Grosvenor Gallery in 1887.

Carnarvon was killed at the first Battle of Newbury on 20 September 1643 by a lone trooper who chanced upon him returning from a successful cavalry charge. As he lay dying he was asked if he had one final request of the King. "No", he replied, "in an hour like this, I have no prayer but to the King of Heaven." The different accounts of the manner of his death are collected in Mr Money's account of the battle (2nd ed. pg. 90).

There is also an elegy on his death in Sir Francis Wortley's Characters and Elegies, 1646. Carnarvon was buried firstly at Jesus College Chapel at the University of Oxford, but his body was removed in 1650 to a family burial place in Wing, Buckinghamshire.

Dormer was succeeded by his eldest son, Charles, who died in 1709 and with him the earldom of Carnarvon in the family of Dormer became extinct.

Honorary titles
Preceded by The Earl of Pembroke	Lord Lieutenant of Buckinghamshire (Royalist); 1641–1643	Vacant Title next held by The Earl of Bridgewater
Peerage of England
New creation	Earl of Carnarvon; 1st creation 1628–1643	Succeeded by Charles Dormer
New creation	Viscount Ascott; 1st creation 1628–1643	Succeeded by Charles Dormer
Preceded by Robert Dormer	Baron Dormer; 1616–1643	Succeeded by Charles Dormer
