= Baron Dormer =

Title in the Peerage of England

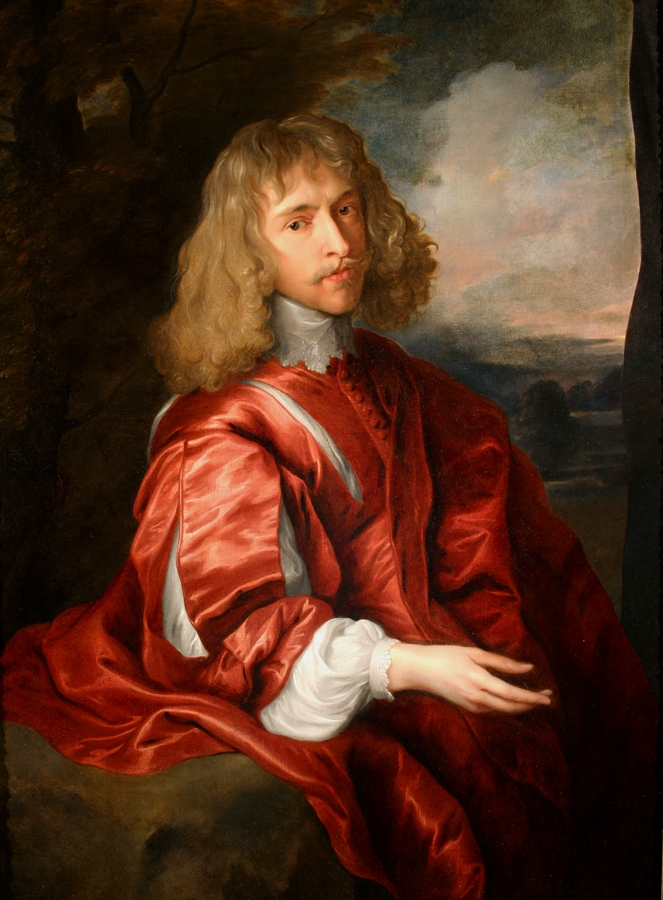
Robert Dormer, 1st Earl of Carnarvon

Arms of Dormer: Azure, ten billets or 4,3,2,1 issuant from a chief of the second a demi-lion rampant sable langued gules

Baron Dormer, of Wyng (or Wenge), County of Buckingham, is a title in the Peerage of England. It was created on 30 June 1615 for Sir Robert Dormer, 1st Baronet. He had, only twenty days earlier on 10 June 1615, been created a baronet "of Wing in the County of Buckingham", in the Baronetage of England.

His grandson, the 2nd Baron Dormer was raised to Viscount Ascott in the County of Buckingham, and Earl of Carnarvon in 1628, and later became a prominent Royalist commander in the Civil War. On the death of his son, the second Earl, in 1707, the viscountcy and earldom became extinct. However, the late Earl was succeeded in the baronetcy and barony by his second cousin, the fourth Baron. He was the grandson of The Hon. Anthony Dormer, second son of the first Baron. On his death this line of the family also failed and the titles passed to his second cousin, the fifth Baron. He was the grandson of The Hon. Robert Dormer, third son of the first Baron. He was succeeded by his son, the sixth Baron. He was a Roman Catholic priest and did not assume the title. On his death the title passed to his younger brother, the seventh Baron.

His grandson, the tenth Baron, who succeeded his half-brother in 1819, was, like many of the recusant Dormer family, a Roman Catholic. However, he converted to the Church of England and took his seat in the House of Lords. He was succeeded by his first cousin, the eleventh Baron. He was the son of The Hon. John Dormer, second son of the seventh Baron. Lord Dormer served as an officer in the Austrian Army. As of 2016 the titles are held by his great-great-grandson, the eighteenth Baron, who succeeded his father in 2016.

== Baron Dormer (1615) ==
- Robert Dormer, 1st Baron Dormer (1551–1616)
- Robert Dormer, 2nd Baron Dormer (1610–1643) (created Earl of Carnarvon in 1628)

=== Earl of Carnarvon (1628) ===
- Robert Dormer, 1st Earl of Carnarvon, 2nd Baron Dormer (1610–1643)
- Charles Dormer, 2nd Earl of Carnarvon, 3rd Baron Dormer (1632–1709)

=== Baron Dormer (1615; reverted) ===
- Rowland Dormer, 4th Baron Dormer (1651–1712)
- Charles Dormer, 5th Baron Dormer (1668–1728)
- Charles Dormer, 6th Baron Dormer (died 1761)
- John Dormer, 7th Baron Dormer (1691–1785)
- Charles Dormer, 8th Baron Dormer (1725–1804)
- Charles Dormer, 9th Baron Dormer (1753–1819)
- John Evelyn Pierrepont Dormer, 10th Baron Dormer (1771–1826)
- Joseph Thaddeus Dormer, 11th Baron Dormer (1790–1871)
- John Baptist Joseph Dormer, 12th Baron Dormer (1830–1900)
- Roland John Dormer, 13th Baron Dormer (1862–1920)
- Charles Joseph Thaddeus Dormer, 14th Baron Dormer (1864–1922)
- Charles Walter James Dormer, 15th Baron Dormer (1903–1975)
- Joseph Spencer Philip Dormer, 16th Baron Dormer (1914–1995)
- Geoffrey Henry Dormer, 17th Baron Dormer (1919–2016)
- William Robert Dormer, 18th Baron Dormer (born 1960)

The heir apparent is the present holder's son, the Hon. Hugo Edward Geoffrey Dormer (born 1995).

== See also ==
- Dormer baronets
