= Dormer baronets =

Title in the Baronetage of England

Arms of Dormer: Azure, ten billets or 4,3,2,1 issuant from a chief of the second a demi-lion rampant sable langued gules

There have been two baronetcies created for persons with the surname Dormer, both in the Baronetage of England. One creation is extant as of 2010.

The Dormer Baronetcy, of Wing (or Wenge or Wyng) in the County of Buckingham, was created in the Baronetage of England on 10 June 1615. For more information on this creation, see the Baron Dormer.

The Dormer Baronetcy, of Lee Grange in the County of Buckingham, was created in the Baronetage of England on 23 July 1661 for John Dormer. The title became extinct on the death of the second Baronet in 1726.

== Dormer baronets, of Wing (1615) ==
- see the Baron Dormer

== Dormer baronets, of Lee Grange (1661) ==
- Sir John Dormer, 1st Baronet (c. 1640–1675)
- Sir William Dormer, 2nd Baronet (1669–1726)

Baronetage of England
Preceded by Blakiston baronets	Dormer baronets 10 June 1615	Succeeded by Egerton baronets
