= Wing, Buckinghamshire =

Village in Buckinghamshire, England

Coordinates: 51.898°N 0.717°W

Wing
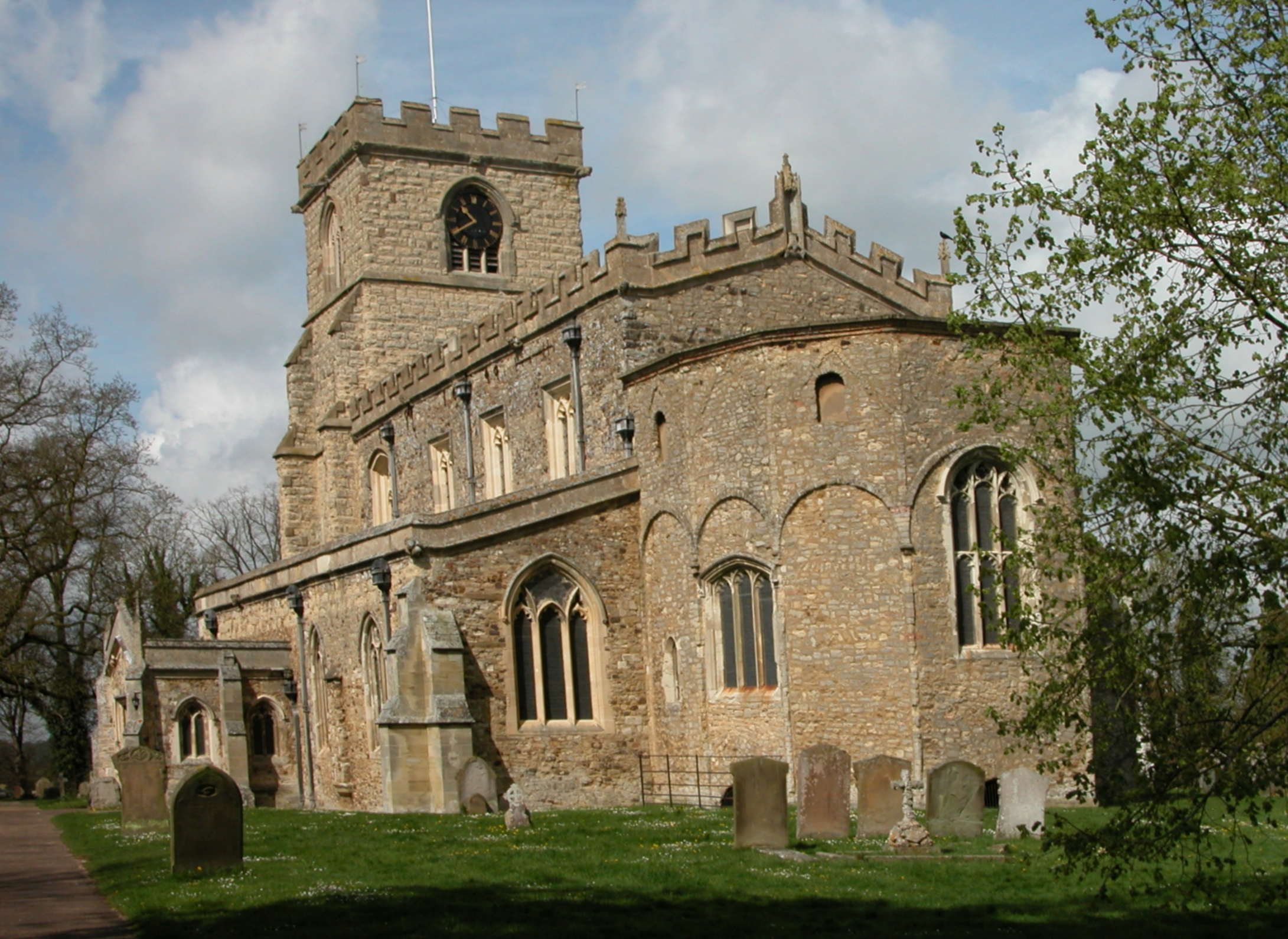
- All Saints' Parish Church, Wing

- Location within Buckinghamshire
- Interactive map of Wing
- Population: 2,745 (2011, including Ascott)
- OS grid reference: SP882229
- Civil parish: Wing
- Unitary authority: Buckinghamshire
- Ceremonial county: Buckinghamshire
- Region: South East
- Country: England
- Sovereign state: United Kingdom
- Post town: LEIGHTON BUZZARD
- Postcode district: LU7
- Dialling code: 01296
- Police: Thames Valley
- Fire: Buckinghamshire
- Ambulance: South Central
- UK Parliament: Aylesbury
- Website: Wing Parish Council

Wing, known in antiquity as Wyng, is a village and civil parish in east Buckinghamshire, England. The village is on the main A418 road between Aylesbury and Leighton Buzzard. It is about 8 miles (13 km) north-east of Aylesbury, 3 miles (5 km) west of Leighton Buzzard, and 12 miles (19 km) south of Milton Keynes.

== History ==
The Domesday Book of 1086 records the toponym as Witehunge. The name occurs in Old English circa 966–975 as Weowungum (dative plural case). It could mean:

- "Wiwa's sons or people".
- "The dwellers at, or devotees of, a heathen temple."

The first syllables of the names of the nearby village of Wingrave and the nearby hamlet of Wingbury have the same etymology.

The remains of the temple referred to may be under the Anglo-Saxon Church of England parish church of All Saints. The BBC programme Meet the Ancestors came to Wing in 2000 and recreated the face of an Anglo-Saxon girl found buried in the old graveyard. Wing claims to have the oldest continuously used religious site in the country, with evidence showing the site has had religious use going back well over 1300 years. The Anglo-Saxon origin of All Saints' parish church makes it one of the oldest churches in England.

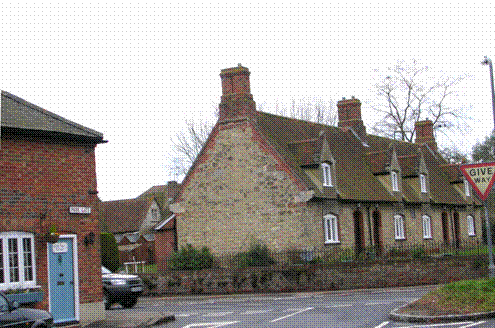
16th-century almshouses

An ancient track, part of the pre-historic Icknield Way linking Oxford with Cambridge, once passed through the village. This was used in the Middle Ages and led to an increase in the village's size, though with the advent of modern roads and motorways this is less used today.

As early as the 7th century there was an abbey near the village at Ascott, that had been built by an unknown member of the House of Wessex royal family and given to a Benedictine convent in Angers. The Anglo-Saxon church in Wing, dedicated to All Saints, was also built at about this time for St Birinus, but evidence found in the 15th century during extensive renovations on the church suggest a Roman structure had stood on this site beforehand. It is unusual among religious buildings of this age for the church and abbey to have been built apart, it was normal for them to be constructed within the same complex of buildings. One possible explanation for this is that the church was built on a pre-existing religious site, which the evidence in the village's name and in the aforementioned archaeological finds seem to suggest. The church contains a number of fine monuments, including the "purest Renaissance monument of the mid-16th century" to Sir Robert Dormer (died 1552), and a wall monument attributed to Louis-François Roubiliac.

Nine hundred metres to the NNE of All Saints’ Church at the end of the High Street are the earthwork remains of a late 11th-, early 12th-century Norman motte-and-bailey castle, which is positioned at the top of Castle Hill. The castle likely had an inner and possibly an outer bailey to the East, although this has now all been built over by the road and housing. The remaining mound stands around 16 feet high and covers an area of around 120 feet.Wing Motte and Bailey castle

Wing also features a Pedal Car Racing team called Wing Racers made up of residents and friends that compete at competitions such as the Shenington 24hr.

== Little-worth ==
Littleworth is in Wing between the main village and the hamlet of Burcott. The hamlet name is of Old English origin, and means 'small enclosure'. Today the hamlet has all but disappeared with the growth of the village of Wing, and remains as a road name only. Littleworth is the road that leads from Wing through Burcott to Soulbury.

== Amenities ==
The village has two schools. Overstone Combined School is a mixed, foundation primary school for children aged 3–11. Cottesloe School is a secondary school for children aged 11–18.

It also has two public houses, a social club, an Indian restaurant, a Chinese takeaway which doubles as a fish and chip shop and a Post Office.

Ascott House, a home of the Rothschild family, is in the parish. The village hall built in 1905 at a cost of £2,000 is in the Rothschild style and is one of the most prominent buildings in the village, and was formally opened by Lord Rothschild.

== World War 2 ==
During WW2, an RAF base was built close to Wing. Completed in 1941, the primary purpose of RAF Wing was for training Wellington bomber crews. The village pubs were popular with RAF personnel, with weekly dances taking place at the village hall. At the end of the war RAF Wing served as a gateway for tens of thousands of men returning from duty in Europe. The base closed in April 1956.

== Third London Airport ==
In 1971, the Roskill Commission identified the disused RAF Wing as the best site for a four-runway national hub airport, generally known as Cublington Airport. This attracted considerable opposition on environmental and noise nuisance grounds, and the plans were first changed to focus on a coastal site at Maplin Sands in the Thames Estuary and eventually scrapped altogether. As a permanent celebration of the victory, Buckinghamshire County Council planted a spinney of over 400 trees on a 3-acre site that would have been at the centre of the airport.

== Transport ==
Wing is about three miles from Leighton Buzzard railway station, which is served by West Midlands Trains on the West Coast Main Line, travelling to destinations such as Birmingham New Street, Milton Keynes Central and London Euston. Wing is served by buses running services between Aylesbury and Milton Keynes operated by Arriva Shires & Essex and between Leighton Buzzard and Aylesbury operated by Z&S International. The M1 motorway is 13 miles to the east, on the other side of Dunstable. A4146 road and A418 road run through the heart of Wing.

== Bus Stops ==
There are three bus stops situated in Wing. The first one is outside the Village Library. The second one next to High Street. The third one is located by the Cottsloe School.

== People from Wing ==
- Dorothy Lawson (1580–1632), recusant and Catholic priest harbourer
- Len Pitchford (1900-1992), cricketer (batsman)
