= Francis Browne (disambiguation) =

Francis Browne (1880–1960), was an Irish photographer and Jesuit priest.

Francis or Frank Browne may also refer to:

- Francis Browne (died 1541), Member of Parliament (MP) for Stamford
- Francis John Browne (1754–1833), English politician, MP for Dorset
- Francis Browne (MP for Bodmin) (fl. 1560s), MP for Bodmin
- Francis Browne, 3rd Viscount Montagu (1610–1682)
- Francis Browne, 4th Viscount Montagu (1638–1708), English peer
- Francis Browne, 4th Baron Kilmaine (1843–1907), Anglo-Irish politician and landowner.
- Francis Fisher Browne (1843–1913), American editor, poet, and critic
- Francis Aubrey Browne (1878–1953), English-born accountant and political figure in British Columbia
- Frank Browne (journalist) (1915–1981), Australian journalist
- Francis Browne (cricketer) (1899–1970), English cricketer, schoolteacher and clergyman
- Francis James Browne (1879–1963), professor of obstetrics and gynaecology
- Francis Browne (priest, died 1797), Anglican priest in Ireland
- Frank Styant Browne (1854–1938), Australian pharmacist, artist, photographer and X-ray pioneer

== See also ==
- Francis Brown (disambiguation)
- Frank Brown (disambiguation)
- Frances Browne (1816–1887), Irish poet and novelist
- Franklin Browne (1873–1946), cricketer
