= A.M.E. Church Review =

Journal of the African Methodist Episcopal Church

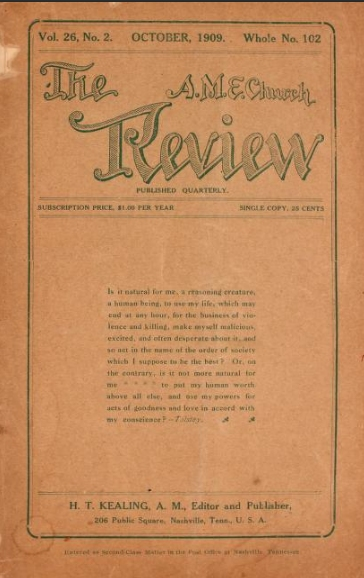
- October 1909 issue
- Frequency: Quarterly
- Format: Print
- Country: United States
- Based in: Nashville, Tennessee, U.S.
- Language: English
- Website: ame-archives.org/DigitalDocuments/s/ame-digital-archives/page/ame-church-review
- ISSN: 0360-3725
- OCLC: 1856226

The A.M.E. Church Review is the journal of the African Methodist Episcopal Church. Established in 1841 and revived in 1884, it is arguably the earliest published African-American journal. It publishes articles on religion, politics, history, and world events.

== History ==
Originally named The A.M.E. Church Magazine, it was first published in September 1841 by the church's general book steward, Rev. George Hogarth of Brooklyn, New York. It was intended to be a monthly publication, but appeared only sporadically and was discontinued after eight years due to lack of funds.

At the 1884 General Conference, the name of the organization's publication was changed to A.M.E. Church Review and Rev. Benjamin Tucker Tanner was elected editor. He was succeeded by Levi Jenkins Coppin in 1888; Hightower Theodore Kealing in 1896; and Reverdy C. Ransom in 1912.

Early contributors to the journal included abolitionist Frederick Douglass, journalist Frances Ellen Watkins Harper, editor T. Thomas Fortune, Judge David Augustus Straker, educator William Sanders Scarborough, Senator Blanche Kelso Bruce, author Theophilus Gould Steward, attorney T. McCants Stewart, and bishops Daniel Alexander Payne, Henry McNeal Turner, and Jabez Pitt Campbell.

== See also ==
- The Christian Recorder
