= Frank Brown =

Frank Brown may refer to:

- Frank Brown (governor) (1846–1920), governor of Maryland
- Frank Herbert Brown (1868–1959), English journalist
- Frank Clyde Brown (1870–1943), American folklorist and university administrator
- Frank Edward Brown (1908–1988), American archaeologist
- Frank Brown (alpine skier) (1937–2016), American Olympic skier
- Frank Brown (footballer, born 1890) (1890–?), English footballer
- Frank Brown (cyclist) (1890–1969), Canadian Olympic cyclist
- Frank Chouteau Brown (1876–1947), American architect
- Frank Paterson Brown (1887–1928), Australian sportsman and journalist
- Francis Harold Brown (1943–2017), American geologist and geochemist
- Frank Brown (entertainer) (1858–1943), clown, acrobat and circus entrepreneur in Argentina
- Frank Brown (journalist) (born c. 1952), American journalist
- Frank J. Brown (1956–2020), African-American visual artist
- Frank A. Brown Jr. (1908–1983), American researcher of biological rhythms
- Frank London Brown (1927–1962), American author, journalist, and activist

== See also ==
- Frank Brown Park, an outdoor recreation facility in Panama City Beach, Florida
- Franklin Browne (1873–1946), English cricketer
- Francis Brown (disambiguation)
- Frank Browne (disambiguation)
