= Francis Brown =

Francis Brown may refer to:

- Francis Brown (theologian) (1849–1916), American Semitic scholar
- Francis Brown (college president) (1784–1820), president of Dartmouth College
- Francis Brown (mathematician) (born 1977), French-British mathematician
- Francis Ernest Brown (1869–1939), headmaster for Geelong Church of England Grammar School
- Francis David Millet Brown (1837–1895), Irish recipient of the Victoria Cross
- Francis Focer Brown (1891–1971), Midwestern American Impressionist painter, professor and director of the Muncie Art Museum
- Francis Graham Brown (1891–1942), Anglican bishop
- F. Taylor Brown (1925–2011), U.S. Navy admiral
- Francis Brown (priest) (1670–1724), Canon of Windsor
- Francis Shunk Brown (1858–1940), Pennsylvania lawyer and attorney general
- Francis Harold Brown (1943–2017), American geologist and geochemist
- Francis Clifton Brown (1874–1963), officer of the Royal Navy

== See also ==
- Fran Brown
- Francis Browne (disambiguation)
- Frances Brown (disambiguation)
- Frank Brown (disambiguation)
