= Susan McKinney Steward =

American physician and writer

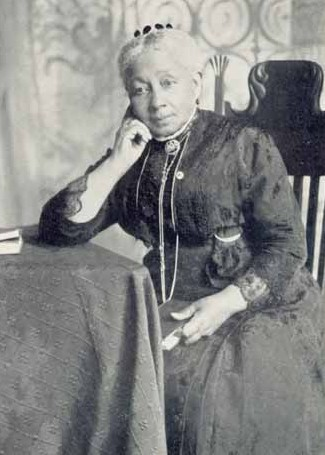
- Born: Susan Maria Smith; March 1847; Crow Hill, Brooklyn, New York, U.S.
- Died: March 17, 1918 (aged 71); Wilberforce, Ohio, U.S.
- Education: New York Medical College
- Scientific career
- Fields: Pediatrics, homeopathy
- Workplaces: Brooklyn Women's Homeopathic Hospital and Dispensary; Brooklyn Home for Aged Colored People; Women's Hospital and Dispensary; Wilberforce University

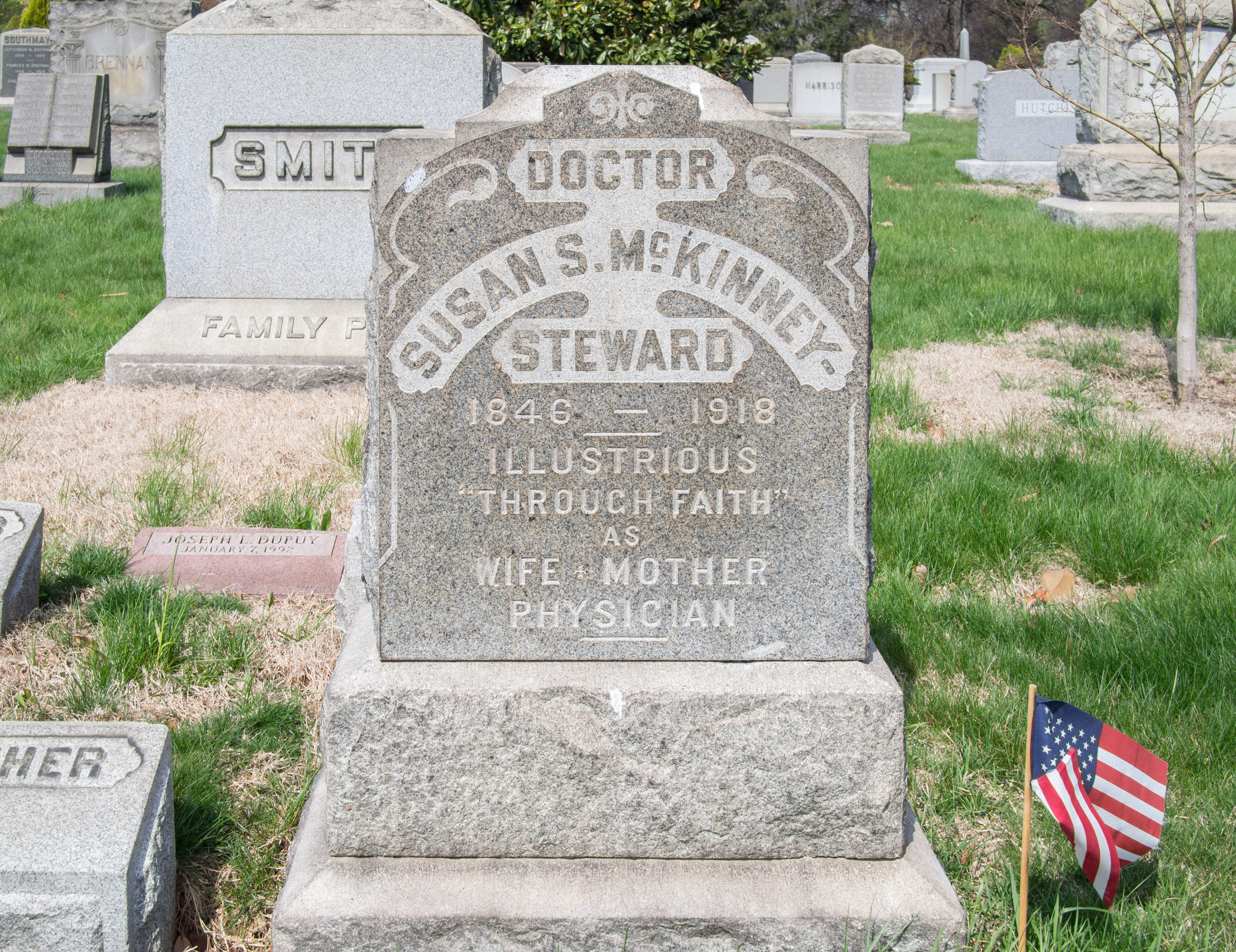
McKinney-Steward's burial site at Green-Wood Cemetery in Brooklyn, New York.

Susan Maria McKinney Steward (March 1847 – March 17, 1918) was an American physician and author. She was the third African-American woman to earn a medical degree, and the first in New York state.

McKinney-Steward's medical career focused on prenatal care and childhood disease. From 1870 to 1895, she ran her own practice in Brooklyn and co-founded the Brooklyn Women's Homeopathic Hospital and Dispensary. She sat on the board and practiced medicine at the Brooklyn Home for Aged Colored People. From 1906, she worked as college physician at the African Methodist Episcopal Church's Wilberforce University in Ohio. In 1911, she attended the Universal Race Congress in London, where she delivered a paper entitled "Colored American Women".

== Biography ==
=== Early life ===
McKinney-Steward was born Susan Maria Smith to Anne and Sylvanus Smith in 1847. She lived at 189 Pearl Street, in Weeksville, now Crown Heights, Brooklyn for ten years until her family moved to a house next door at 213 Pearl Street. They later moved again to 243 Pearl Street. Susan was part of a large family, and had nine other siblings. Her eldest sister, Sarah J. Garnet who was the wife of Henry Highland Garnet, eventually became the first African-American female school principal in the New York City public school system. Her other sisters, Emma Tompkins became a school teacher, Clara Brown was a piano teacher, and Mary was a hair stylist. Her father held jobs as a porter, carpet cleaner, and laborer. However, he also sold hogs which provided him and his family with a respectable living. As a child, Susan was fond of music and learned to play the organ. Because of her musical training she taught at a public school in Washington, D.C., for around 2 years. Eventually, she played the organ and was the choir director at Siloam Presbyterian Church and the Bridge Street African Methodist Episcopal Church.

=== Education and career ===
Although the exact reason McKinney-Steward wanted to pursue medicine is unknown, there are some factors that could explain her motivation. One possibility is that losing two of her brothers during the Civil War could have caused her to seek out a career where she could prevent other people from dying. Another possibility is the cholera epidemic that was occurring in 1866. Increased fatalities due to the disease could have encouraged her to have an active role in people's health. In 1867, she attended the New York Medical College for Women. At that time, it would have usually brought public attention by the press if an African-American women had been admitted into medical school. At the time, the city had an anti-Black democratic press. However, her mentor Dr. Lozier had a strong abolitionist background and was likely able to deter press which avoided a public outcry. Although McKinney's father was a wealthy pig farmer who could have easily afforded her tuition costs, she preferred to pay for her education herself. She used money she had earned teaching at a colored school in Manhattan along with money earned from teaching music in Washington, D.C., and New York City to fund her medical school education. She chose a career in homeopathy, instead of medical study, most likely because it was more accessible to women. Because of her work ethic and academic performance, she was selected as valedictorian and graduated in 1869. However, neither the local newspapers or The New York Times included her valedictory address or included that she was of African descent. And if they did mention McKinney it was hidden in the papers published. After graduation, she took a course at the Long Island College Hospital.

Although obtaining her degree and being selected as valedictorian, McKinney-Steward struggled to find a reliable job. In addition, her degree in homeopathic medicine was not viewed in the same high regard that a medical degree was. In fact, because homeopathic medicine was seen as quackery medicine not many people came to her for treatment. Susan found work treating malnourished children until eventually her reputation grew to where she could treat both white and black patients. She received many positive reviews and recognitions from physicians in her area. Her clientele increased to the point where she became a respected and wealthy physician. The Courier did provide information about her graduating, however, did not mention that she was valedictorian. The Courier focused on her attire and her status within society at the time. Despite all the challenges that McKinney faced she was elected into the New York Homeopathic Medical Society in 1896.

Susan has published medical papers. The first one published in 1883 over a case that involved a woman who was in charge of taking care of her burn suffering mother. The woman treated her mother with carbolic acid, at this time the woman also slept in the same bed with her mother and developed an unknown sickness. After the nurse on the case noticed the woman's condition Dr. McKinney was brought in, where she successfully treated the woman.

Susan's second paper "Marasmus Infantum" was published in 1886. This paper focused on childhood diseases, for example Marasmus. Marasmus was known as a disease that is caused by unsuitable food, vomiting, diarrhea, worms, and inheriting syphilis. Dr. Steward advocated for homeopathic treatment for children and infants suffering from Marasmus because they stood a better chance of recovery. Since Dr. Steward specialized in childhood disease, the way she handled Marasmus cases gained her recognition for her skill and knowledge.

McKinney-Steward's medical career focused on prenatal care and childhood disease where she worked with patients of all races. From 1870 to 1895, she ran her own practice in Brooklyn and co-founded the Brooklyn Women's Homeopathic Hospital and Dispensary in 1881. She sat on the board of and practiced medicine at the Brooklyn Home for Aged Colored People and served on the staff at New York Medical College and Hospital for Women in Manhattan. By 1906, she and her second husband, Theophilus Gould Steward, found positions at the African Methodist Episcopal Church's Wilberforce University in Ohio, where she worked as college physician. In 1911 she attended the Universal Race Congress in London, where she delivered a paper entitled "Colored American Women". Her paper was focused on the achievements of numerous African American women. The Congress brought together many people from all over the world searching for ways to enhance their relationships and continue dialogue between the East and West parts of the world. In 1914, Susan addressed the National Association of Colored Women's Clubs in a speech titled "Women in Medicine". Her objective of the speech was to end the separation of men and women in medical schools. She advocated that women would have the same opportunity for internship positions if women were allowed to attend schools alongside men.

Susan McKinney Steward was also very active politically within her community. She helped found and then served on the executive board of the Women's Loyal Union. The Women's Loyal Union worked to bring to light the civil and social status of African Americans and to alert others of the injustice of denying any citizen from any class or race of their unalienable rights. For example, one important act this group made was from 1894 to 1895 the WLU petitioned against Congress for a federal investigation of lynching. This group of women were additionally large supporters and activist for black educators' rights. Along with her work with these women, Susan also served for a time as president of her local chapter of Women's Christian Temperance Union. The WCTU was founded in Cleveland, Ohio, in 1874. Initially, the organization's primary focus was on fighting against the negative affect alcohol had on families and society. In 1879, when Francis Willard became president, they broadened their scopes to more social reform causes, such as women's suffrage, child-labor, public health, anti-prostitution and international peace. This organization that Susan served on is now the oldest voluntary, non-sectarian women's organization and is still active internationally.

=== Marriage and children ===
In 1871 she was married to Reverend William G. McKinney from South Carolina, who was a brother-in-law of the Rev. Henry Cardozo. Before her marriage, she was still struggling to find work and be in good economic standing. However, her marriage to William McKinney was able to partially eliminate some of the economic strain as she grew her career. They had two children, Anna and William Sylvanus. Due to a cerebral hemorrhage in 1890, William McKinney was unable to keep up with his previous work responsibilities. Susan then had to be the primary supporter of their family in addition to six of Susan's extended family. William McKinney died two years after his cerebral hemorrhage in 1892.

Four years after her previous husband's death, in 1896, Susan remarried to United States Army Buffalo Soldier and chaplain, Theophilus Gould Steward. His unit was the first all-black regiment in the U.S. Army. As chaplain of the Buffalo Soldiers, the sole purpose was to care for the souls of the soldiers while Susan traveled with him, to tend to their wounds. Shortly after their marriage, she moved with him to Fort Missoula in Montana. They later moved in 1902 to Fort Niobrara, Nebraska and again in 1906 to Fort McIntosh in Texas. She practiced in both Montana and Nebraska. Theophilus Steward stated that Susan "entered heartily into the work among the soldiers and became an excellent step mother to [his] children."

=== Death and legacy ===
She died suddenly and unexpectedly at Wilberforce University on March 7, 1918. Her body was transported to Brooklyn, New York where she was interred at Green-Wood Cemetery. Her funeral was on March 10, 1918. Many people spoke at her funeral, including Hallie Quinn Brown, the president of Wilberforce University, Dr. William Scarborough, and author Dr. W. E. B. Dubois.

In 1974, the New York Board of Education named a Brooklyn school "Dr. Susan Smith McKinney Junior High School" in her remembrance. African-American women physicians from New York, New Jersey, and Connecticut also honored her by naming their chapter of the National Medical Association after her in 1976. One Hundred and forty years later, her great great niece followed in her legacy as a physician. The Reverend Dr. A. Louise Bonaparte practiced medicine as a Surgical Oncologist.

In the summer of 2020, author Kaitlyn Greenidge wrote a novel called Libertie with an excerpt named "Doers of the World." This excerpt is a short fiction story based on the life of Susan as it follows a girl named Libertie who watches her mother, Cathy, take care of and treat patients. In this story Cathy is modeled after Susan as she experiences many of the same hardships as she did and follows her journey in exploring the limits of care. In 2020 this short story won the tenth annual Alice Hoffman Prize for Fiction.

Dr. Susan McKinney Secondary School of the Arts in Brooklyn and the Susan Smith McKinney Steward Medical Society are named for her. Actress Ellen Holly is her great-granddaughter.
