= Nicholas Lane =

17th-century English surveyor and cartographer

- Born: c. 1585 in or near Cobham, Surrey
- Died: 1644
- Resting place: Kingston upon Thames
- Other name: Nycholaus Lane
- Occupations: surveyor and cartographer
- Years active: c. 1613–1640
- Employer: Charles I of England

Nicholas Lane (c. 1585 – 1644) was an English surveyor and cartographer, active in the early part of the seventeenth century, rising to prominence in his works for King Charles I.

== Birth and early life ==
He was probably born at or near Cobham in Surrey. (Note: His father, also Nicholas Lane, was of Cobham by 1594, later removing to Kingston, perhaps following expiry of his lease of Oxdowne Farm at Stokes Heath in 1609, but this may be the same Nicholas Lane who was assessed for lay subsidy in Morden parish in 1593 when no Lane was assessed in Cobham. Contemporary probate inventories also show Nicholas Lane witnessing the wills of Edward Dumbrell of Morden (proved 1587) and Richard Alden of Malden, yeoman (whose will dated 18 April 1591 describes Lane as of Morden and the testator's “trusty friend” and appoints him overseer of the will's administration).) Contemporary accounts of his age vary considerably, (Note: His age was stated as 31 in 1616/17, about 40 in 1621, 50 or thereabouts in 1625, and 53 in 1629.) but the circumstance he was apprenticed to Robert Jennings of Kingston upon Thames for seven years from May 1601 (Note: In 1610 he was made free of the Butchers’ Company, one of only four livery companies registered at Kingston, freemen being divided among them irrespective of trade.) suggests a birthdate no earlier than 1585. Jennings, a fisherman, was married to Lane's sister Beatrice and, with Lane's younger brother Henry, was lessee of an eyot in the river near Kingston. Knowledge of the Thames would have been useful in some of Nicholas Lane's later assignments, but there is no evidence he fished as an occupation. In legal proceedings he described himself as “yeoman”, versed in the “art of measuring which he often practises”.

== Early career ==
He was professionally active as a surveyor by 1613 when he mapped lands at Painshill which were the subject of a continuing dispute between Robert Bickerstaffe and James Starr, (Note: For Bickerstaffe's feud with James Starr in respect of lands at Cobham and Walton-on-Thames, see Gurney, John (2007), Brave Community, The Digger Movement in the English Revolution, Manchester University Press, pp. 156–7, and Gurney, John (2014), "Gerrard Winstanley and the Context of Place", Prose Studies, 36: 1–14, doi:10.1080/01440357.2014.914744, S2CID 145619701. Seven years after his survey of Painshill, Lane was a deponent in Exchequer proceedings arising from Bickerstaffe's encroachment on Starr's property.) and somewhat later he surveyed the manor of Slyfield in Great Bookham for the purpose of arbitration proceedings arising from its sale by Henry Bretton to George Shiers, apothecary to James I, in 1614. Lane’s deposition in a subsequent Chancery suit reveals that he used the chain and plane table methods in his survey (Note: In response to allegations made by Bretton, Lane disputed that he had allowed Shiers to carry his measuring chain during the survey and denied having been “offered any consideration whereby to procure him to do anything contrary to his mind” during the period he lodged with Shiers at Slyfield.) and that his measurements of the Slyfield lands were substantially consistent with those of William Oughtred (Note: This may have been William Oughtred, inventor of several measuring and calculating instruments, who was rector of the nearby parish of Albury and sometimes practised as a surveyor. It has been suggested that around this time Oughtred was working on his Treatise on Trigonometry (not published until 1657): see entry for Oughtred (William) in A New and General Biographical Dictionary of the Most Eminent Persons. Vol. X. London: printed for W. Strahan and others. 1784. p. 93.) who had earlier surveyed the property for Shiers and afterwards cooperated with Lane to “perfect” their work. A recent assessment of another of Lane’s maps confirms “overall accuracy of over 99%”.

In the 1620s he worked for John Goode and his son, Sebastian Goode, of Malden. In 1621 he mapped land at Chessington forming part of the manor of Malden, held by John Goode from the Crown but claimed by Merton College, Oxford. Six years later, following compromise of Merton's ejectment action against the Goodes, Lane mapped the whole manor for the son. The area was the subject of a long-running dispute concerning the boundary between the College's land and the Royal estate of Nonsuch Great Park (the part that subsequently became known as Worcester Park). Lane's map of 1627 documents the outcome of litigation in the matter, which was reconfirmed by Charles I in 1633.

== Later career ==
The social status of Lane's clients increased (Note: They included Sir Henry Snellyer, Sir Stephen Leonard, Sir Multon Lambard, Laurence Wright, Sir John Pynchon, Viscount Wimbledon, Sir John Bramston and Viscount Montagu.) and in the later 1630s he was employed by the Crown in connection with the creation of both Richmond Park and Longford River. His map of the park shows the several courses he surveyed for the perimeter wall and identifies the option ultimately chosen in January 1638. In the same year he was commissioned to plan the scheme whereby water from the River Colne at Longford would be diverted to Hampton Court Palace. The channel he proposed, 19,000 metres in length with an overall fall of 8 metres, was cut in little more than nine months by Edward Manning, the same contractor who had built the Richmond Park wall. From £4,000 spent on the Longford project, Lane was allowed £5 for his work. (Note: The payment to Lane seems modest: ten years earlier he had charged £10 for surveying and mapping Thomas Challenor's property at Lingfield, Sussex.) The new river fed the fountains at Hampton Court and, later, the water features in Bushy Park. The layout of Bushy Park has also been attributed to Lane.

Also in the 1630s Lane had been active for the Crown in the Fens, and his sketches of large tracts of land between Peterborough and Wisbech survive. “Mr Lane's propositions for various works to be constructed in the fen district, co. Lincoln” were costed by Simon Hill, Director of Works in the Fens, in 1636, perhaps indicating that Nicholas Lane had previously devised water management schemes that recommended him for the Longford River assignment. By this time he was supported in his work by his son Nicholas, and in 1637 he took another of his sons, Thomas, as his apprentice. (Note: Thomas Lane of Kingston (c.1621-63) was active as a surveyor, 1654-59, mapping lands in Surrey, Essex, and Hertfordshire.) The signatures of both Nicholas senior and junior appear on a map of Putney on which they evidently collaborated in 1636/7.

A 1640 map of lands in Wonersh, commissioned by Viscount Montagu, whose Sussex estates Lane had mapped some years earlier, may be Lane's last known work. A 1642 map of a small part of Horton in Buckinghamshire has been attributed to him but bears what looks more like the signature of his son Nicholas. (Note: The younger Nicholas Lane (1614-74) was one of the surveyors appointed in connection with Charles I's re-leasing of the Londonderry Plantation in 1639 and was subsequently tenant of part of the Fishmongers’ Proportion.)

He died in 1644 and was buried at Kingston where he had lived in Wood Street and had been a churchwarden.

== Legacy ==
Lane's surviving work provides a valuable resource for historians. For example, Lane's map of Putney, combined with the 1665 hearth tax list, has provided a key source for reconstructing a detailed view of life in the London suburb in the later seventeenth century. In 1787 it furnished information relevant to resolving the disputed boundary between Putney and Wandsworth parishes.

== Maps ==
Lane's maps of the following are known to survive:

- Lands at Painshill, Cobham, Surrey, November 1613
- Lands belonging to Faversham Grammar School and Ewell House, Kent, April 1615 (held by The Faversham Society)
- Oxdownes in Cobham parish, Surrey, 1618 (Note: Oxdownes, Rydons, Mead Acre and Whites had been leased by George Evelyn to Thomas Cateringham for 21 years in 1588; the lease of these lands (otherwise known as Stokesheath Farm, Oxshott) appears to have been assigned to Nicholas Lane's father and was due to expire in 1609. Lane's map of 1618 was commissioned by Richard Evelyn (father of the diarist John Evelyn).)
- Malden Common and Chessington Park, Surrey, 1621
- Tenement at Bayhurst Hall, Little Bayhurst, and woods in Chertsey and Malden, March 1621
- Enclosures in the Royal Manor of Ligham and Balham, Surrey, 1622
- Manor of Beckenham, Kent, 1623
- Malden parish, Surrey, 1627
- Messuage called Blacknest in Keston, Kent, June 1630
- Manor of West Wickham, Kent, 1632
- Part of the Manor of Cryalls, Brenchley, Kent, August 1632
- Manor of Dagenham and Cockrels, Delland and Mauland, Romford, Essex, April 1633
- Greatworth, Northamptonshire, December 1634
- Manor of Skreens of Teyhall in Roxwell, Shellow Bowells and Willingale, Essex, July 1635
- Manor of Cocking, Midhurst, West Sussex, 1635
- Cowdray, Easbourn Priory and Verdley, Midhurst, West Sussex, February 1635/6
- Part of Putney parish, Surrey, 1637 (surveyed December 1636)
- Great Common Fen and its surroundings, showing drains and dikes, near Wisbech, Cambridgeshire, 1637.
- The Fens in an area between Crowland and Eye, Cambridgeshire, Lincolnshire, Northamptonshire, 1637.
- Part of Laddus Fen, showing Elm Leame, Cambridgeshire, Huntingdonshire, Norfolk, 1637
- Wigging Moore, Sir Oliver Cromwell's at Wigging, Abbotts Pingle and common belonging to Ramsey, Huntingdonshire, 1637 (Note: Included were lands belonging to Sir Oliver Cromwell (uncle of the later Protector) which in October 1637 were charged with contribution to the costs of maintaining what became known as the Bedford Level: see Wells, Samuel (1830). The History of the Drainage of the Great Level of the Fens Called Bedford Level. Vol. II. London. p. 249.)
- Richmond Common, Petersham Common and Mortlake Common, with parts of Roehampton, Kingston, Wimbledon and Combe, showing the extent of the “New Park” (Richmond Park), Surrey, 1637
- Copyhold lands in Wonersh, Surrey, 1640

== Bibliography ==
- Gunasena, Diana (September 1982). "Nicholas Lane, Seventeenth Century Land Surveyor and Cartographer". The Wandsworth Historian (34). Wandsworth Historical Society: 1–8.
- Gunasena, Diana (Spring 2007). "The Nicholas Lane Family Dynasty". The Wandsworth Historian (84). Wandsworth Historical Society: 1–5.
