= Marie Lee =

Marie Lee may refer to:

- Marie Lee (writer), American author, novelist and essayist
- Marie Madeleine Lee (1932–2026), Mauritian politician and diplomat

== See also ==
- Mary Lee (disambiguation)
