= Frances Brown =

Frances Brown may refer to:

- Frances R. Brown (1908–1998), American educator and college president
- Frances Jane Scroggins Brown (1819–1914), African American Underground Railroad station operator
- Frances Brown, married name of Frances Drake (1912–2000), American actress
- Frances Brown (died 1945), victim of serial killer William Heirens
- Frances Brown (1943–1964), victim of the 1960s serial killer known as 'Jack the Stripper'

== See also ==
- Frances Browne (1816–1887), Irish poet and novelist
- Frances Cave-Browne-Cave (1876–1965), English mathematician and educator
- Francis Brown (disambiguation)
