= Kaitlyn Greenidge =

American writer

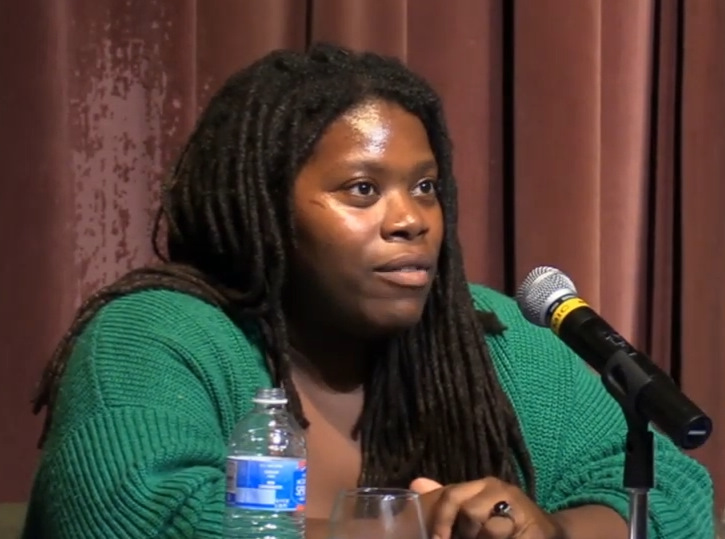
- Greenidge at Cambridge Friends School in 2019
- Born: Boston, Massachusetts
- Education: Wesleyan University (BA); Hunter College (MFA)
- Occupation: Writer
- Children: 1
- Writing career
- Language: English
- Genre: Literary fiction
- Subjects: Culture, society, reviews
- Notable works: We Love You, Charlie Freeman
- Notable awards: Whiting Award for Fiction (2017)
- Website: kaitlyngreenidge.com

Kaitlyn Greenidge is an American writer. She received a 2017 Whiting Award for Fiction for her debut novel, We Love You, Charlie Freeman. Her second book is a historical novel called Libertie (2021).

== Early life and education ==
Greenidge was born in Boston and grew up in the neighboring communities of Somerville and Arlington. Her mother, a social worker and her two sisters lived in a single-parent household after her parents divorced when she was 7. Kaitlyn and her sisters were among the few students of color in their school district, which was said to be exclusive.

Taking time off from school, she and her high school best friend moved to Juneau, Alaska for about six months. She worked for Gavel to Gavel, an Alaska legislative program similar to national government ones on C-SPAN. She found the job by meeting a man who worked for KTOO-TV while traveling with her friend on the ferry to Juneau. She received her bachelor's degree from Wesleyan University in Middletown, Connecticut and her MFA from Hunter College in Manhattan.

== Career ==
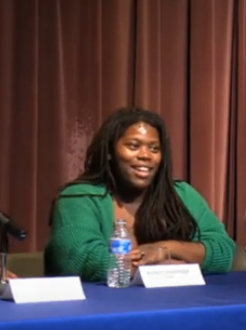
Kaitlyn Greenidge in October 2019

Greenidge has written nonfiction for outlets including Elle, Vogue, The New York Times, and The Wall Street Journal. In September 2020 she was hired as the features director for Harper's Bazaar.

=== Books ===
Greenidge's debut novel, We Love You, Charlie Freeman, was released in 2016. It is the story of an African American family, the Freemans, who adopt a chimpanzee and raise it as a family member for an institutional research project. The book received positive critical reception; it was called "masterful" in a Paste review, and a "vivid and poignant coming-of-age story" by Kirkus Reviews. She won a 2017 Whiting Award for the book.

She received a 2018–2019 fellowship from the Radcliffe Institute, where she worked on "an untitled novel based in part on the life of Susan McKinney Steward, the first black female doctor in the state of New York." The novel, Libertie, was released by Algonquin Books in March 2021. In a starred review by Publishers Weekly, the book was called "another genius work of radical historical fiction." Kirkus Reviews said in a similarly positive review, "Greenidge explores issues that are still real today while also inviting readers into historical moments that will be new to many."

== Personal life ==
Greenidge lives in central Massachusetts with her daughter who was born in 2019.

== Accolades ==
- 2017 - Whiting Award for Fiction (for We Love You, Charlie Freeman)
- 2021 - Guggenheim Fellowship for Fiction

== Works ==
=== Books ===
- We Love You, Charlie Freeman (2016), Algonquin, ISBN 9781616204679
- Libertie (2021), Algonquin, ISBN 9781616207014

=== Articles ===
- What Walmart Doesn't Get About Juneteenth (2021); The New York Times – Opinion Guest Essay
