= Mary Lee =

Mary Lee may refer to:

- Mary Chudleigh (1656–1710), née Lee, English writer and poet
- Mary Lee (actress) (1924–1996), big band singer and B movie actress
- Mary Lee (singer) (1921–2022), Scottish singer
- Mary Lee (suffragist) (1821–1909), social reformer in South Australia
- Mary Ann Lee (1824–1899), American ballerina
- Mary Anna Custis Lee (1807–1873), American general's wife
- Mary Custis Lee (1835—1918), American heiress
- Mary Greenhow Lee (1819–1907), American diarist
- Mary Isabella Lee (1871–1939), New Zealand servant, dressmaker, coalminer and homemaker
- Mary Paik Lee (1900–1995), Korean American writer
- Mary Soon Lee (born 1965), British speculative fiction writer and poet
- Mary Digges Lee (1745–1805), American patriot
- Mary E. Ashe Lee (1851–1932), African-American writer, educator, and churchwoman
- Mary Elizabeth Lee (1813–1849), writer from the Southern United States
- Mary Esther Lee, birth name of Mary von Waldersee
- Mary Slingsby (died 1693), English actress, after first marriage known as Mary Lee
- Mary Lee (1846–1908), children's writer, Mary and Catherine Lee

== See also ==
- Mary Lee's Corvette, New York-based band led by Michigan-born singer-songwriter Mary Lee Kortes
- Mary Leigh (1885–1979), English political activist and suffragette
