= Effie Lee Newsome =

American poet and columnist (1885–1979)

- Born: Mary Effie Lee; January 16, 1885; Philadelphia, Pennsylvania, U.S.
- Died: 1979 (aged 93–94)
- Education: Wilberforce University; Oberlin College; Pennsylvania Academy of the Fine Arts; University of Pennsylvania
- Occupations: Writer, editor, librarian, educator

Effie Lee Newsome (January 16, 1885 – 1979), born Mary Effie Lee in Philadelphia, Pennsylvania, was a Harlem Renaissance writer. She mostly wrote children's poems, and was the first famous African-American poet whose work was mostly in this area. Her first publications appeared in W.E.B. Du Bois and Jessie Fauset's periodical for children, The Brownies' Book. She edited a column in The Crisis from 1925 until 1929, called "The Little Page", where she made drawings and wrote poetry for children and parables about being young and black in the 1920s. Newsome also illustrated for children's magazines and edited children's columns for Opportunity.

Her volume of poetry was issued by Carter G. Woodson's Associated Publishers. Gladiola Garden (1940), a collection for children, was illustrated by the important painter Lois Mailou Jones. An amateur illustrator whose drawings of birds appear on the Children's Page of The Crisis, Newsome also illustrated Pauline E. Dinkins's African Folk Tales (1933). She wrote poems for adults, which were included in The Poetry of the Negro (1949).

In addition to her writing, she worked as a librarian at an elementary school in Wilberforce, Ohio. She attended Wilberforce University, Oberlin College, the Pennsylvania Academy of the Fine Arts, and the University of Pennsylvania.

== Biography ==
=== Early life and education ===
Mary Effie Lee, better known as Effie Lee Newsome, was born on January 19, 1885, in Philadelphia, to parents Benjamin Franklin Lee and Mary Elizabeth Ashe Lee. In 1892, Newsome's father was named the 20th Bishop of the A.M.E. Church in Waco, Texas. In 1896, the family moved from Texas to Xenia, Ohio. Effie began her higher education at Wilberforce University (1901–1904), Oberlin College (1904–1905), the Philadelphia Academy of Fine Arts (1907–1908), and the University of Pennsylvania (1911–1914).

=== Adulthood ===
Starting in 1917, Effie Lee Newsome began working with W. E. B. Du Bois on The Crisis magazine. In 1920, Mary Effie Lee married Reverend Henry Nesby Newsome, and she was thereafter was known as Effie Lee Newsome. After their marriage, Effie and Reverend Henry moved to Birmingham, Alabama. Newsome continued to contribute to a section of The Crisis known as The Little Page until 1934. While in Alabama, she organized the Boys of Birmingham Club and became an elementary school teacher and children's librarian. After relocating to Wilberforce, Ohio, Effie Lee Newsome found work as a librarian in an elementary school and continued to build her career as a writer during the Harlem Renaissance.

== Career ==
Though Effie Lee Newsome was primarily known as a nature poet and a contributor to children's literature, her impression of the people of the Harlem Renaissance was clear. Upon starting to write for The Crisis in 1917, and then in 1925, writing for her own section of the magazine known as The Little Page, Newsome was given a specific task. It was Newsome's job to teach the black youth of America that to be colored was to be beautiful. Such ideas were present in poems such as Newsome's To a Black Boy. Newsome was also expected to teach the black youth about their history as a people and how to turn the anger toward white America into love and compassion. Newsome's contribution to children's literature was aligned to some degree with that of W. E. B Du Bois, her editor in the early days of the National Association for the Advancement of Colored People (NAACP). Their work together is an important part of Newsome's story, for it was Newsome's job to carry on within the pages of The Crisis Magazine (the NAACP monthly) what Du Bois had tried to achieve in his periodical for children, The Brownies' Book (also under NAACP auspices).

== Papers ==
A 1974 tornado destroyed the Newsome home in Xenia, Ohio, and most of her papers were lost. Newsome wrote a biographical sketch for Arna Bontemps which is currently in the Harold Jackson Collection at the Atlanta University Center Library in Atlanta, Georgia.
