= Hallie Quinn Brown =

American writer and activist

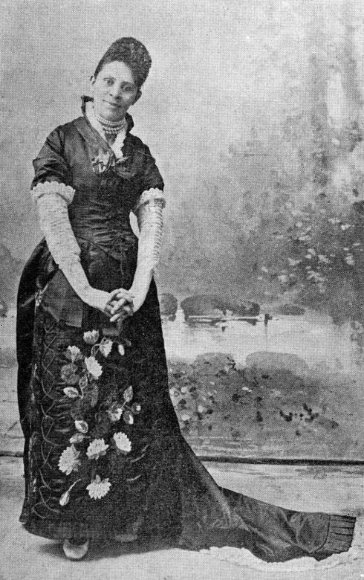
- Born: Hallie Quinn Brown; March 15, 1845 or 1850; Pittsburgh, Pennsylvania, U.S.
- Died: September 16, 1949 (aged 99–104); Wilberforce, Ohio, U.S.
- Resting place: Massies Creek Cemetery, Cedarville, Ohio
- Citizenship: USA
- Education: Wilberforce University
- Occupations: Educator, writer, activist

Hallie Quinn Brown (March 15, 1845/1850 - September 16, 1949) was an African-American educator and activist. She moved with her parents (who were formerly enslaved) while relatively young to a farm near Chatham, Ontario, Canada, in 1864 and then to Ohio in 1870. In 1868, she began a course of study in Wilberforce University, Ohio, from which she graduated in 1873 with the degree of Bachelor of Science.

She started her career by teaching at a country school in South Carolina and, simultaneously, a class of older people. After this, she went to Mississippi, where she again had charge of a school. She became employed as a teacher at Yazoo City, Mississippi, before securing a position as teacher in Dayton, Ohio. Resigning due to ill health, she then traveled in the interest of Wilberforce University on a lecture tour. She was particularly welcomed at Hampton Normal School (now Hampton University) in Virginia. Though elected as an instructor in elocution and literature at Wilberforce University, she declined the offer to accept a position at Tuskegee Institute. In 1886, she graduated from Chautauqua, later receiving the degree of Master of Science from her alma mater, Wilberforce University, being the first woman to do so.

The Hallie Q. Brown Community Center in Saint Paul, Minnesota, established in 1929, was established to serve the community. It was named to commemorate the life of Hallie Quinn Brown. The library at Central State University in Wilberforce, Ohio is named the Hallie Q. Brown Memorial Library in her honor.

== Biography ==
Brown was born in Pennsylvania, one of seven children. Her parents, Frances Jane Scroggins and Thomas Arthur Brown, were freed slaves. Her brother, Jeremiah, became a politician in Ohio. At a young age, her parents and siblings migrated to Ontario, Canada. She attended Wilberforce University and earned her Bachelor of Science degree in 1873. There were a total of six people in her class; she graduated salutatorian. One of her classmates was Mary E. Ashe Lee, the wife of Rev. B. F. Lee, D.D., ex-President of Wilberforce.

She was a prominent member of the African Methodist Episcopal Church (AME); also a member of the "King's Daughters", "Human Rights League", and the "Isabella Association".

Brown died on September 16, 1949, in Wilberforce, Ohio. Her biography, Hallie Quinn Brown, Black Woman Elocutionist, was published by Annjennette Sophie McFarlin in 1975.

== Career and service ==
=== Educator ===
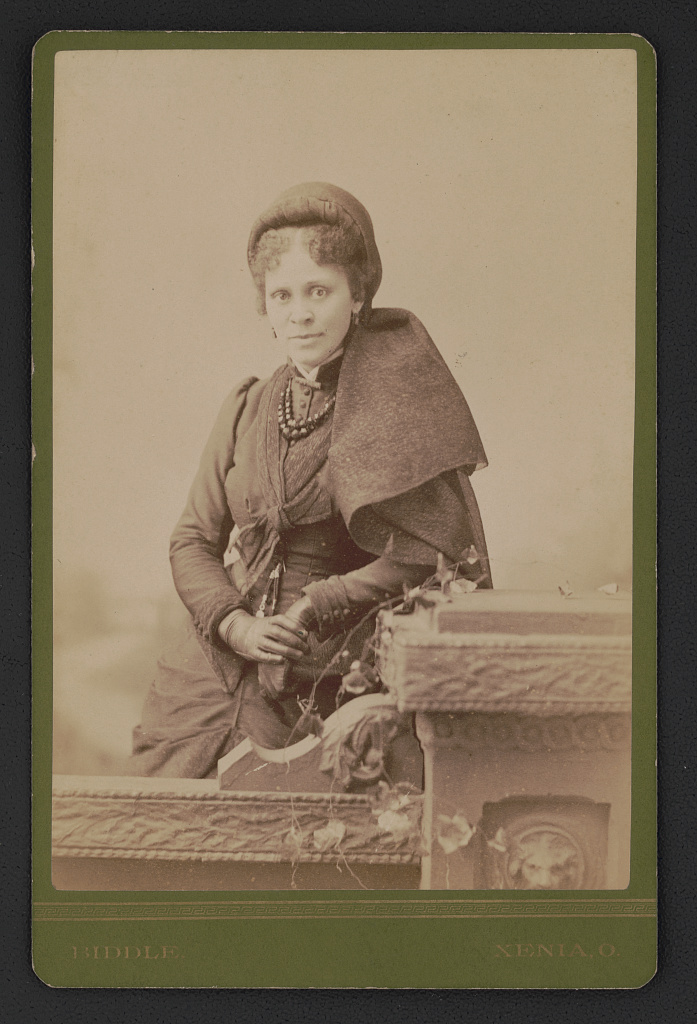
Cabinet card of Hallie Quinn Brown

Her first school was on a plantation in South Carolina, where she endured the rough life as best she could and taught many children from neighboring plantations. She also taught a class of aged people who were then able to read the Bible. She next took charge of a school on Sonora Plantation in Mississippi, the people much hindered by the use of tobacco and whisky. Her plantation school had no windows but was well-ventilated, and the rain beat in fiercely. Not successfully getting the authorities to fix the building, she secured the willing service of two of her larger students. She mounted one mule and the two boys another, and thus they rode to the gin mill. They got cotton seed, returned, mixed it with earth, which formed a plastic mortar, and with her own hands, she pasted up the holes.

Her fame as an instructor spread and her services were secured as a teacher at Yazoo City. Because of the unsettled state of affairs in 1874–5, she was compelled to return North. Brown then taught in Dayton, Ohio, for four years. Owing to ill health, she gave up teaching. She was persuaded to travel for her alma mater, Wilberforce, and started on a lecturing tour, concluding at Hampton School, Virginia. After taking a course in elocution at this place, she traveled again, having much greater success, and received favorable criticism from the press.

She was dean of Allen University in Columbia, South Carolina, from 1885 to 1887 and principal of Tuskegee Institute in Alabama during 1892–93 under Booker T. Washington. She became a professor at Wilberforce in 1893. She was a frequent lecturer on African American issues and the temperance movement, speaking at the international Woman's Christian Temperance Union conference in London in 1895 and representing the United States at the International Congress of Women in London in 1899. She also performed in front of Queen Victoria in 1897.

In 1896, she held a meeting in Edinburgh and gave an interview with a correspondent of The Edinburgh Evening News. The correspondent wrote:

"Our representative found Miss Brown eager to lay before the public the case of the American negro, whose troubles are far from having been ended by the mere process of emancipation…. Miss Brown had some striking faces to narrate of the enmity of the white population towards their black brethren. The feeling, of course, is most bitter in the Southern States – the old slave centres. Even in the North, however, it manifests itself. "I have travelled and conversed with educated people of the well-to-do class, who the moment they discovered that I had a drop or two of negro blood in me, got out of the way, looking as though they could have kicked themselves for having even unwittingly fallen into such company." In many districts, a negro who went into a white man's church and took a seat there would promptly be invited out, and, if he did not go, would be hustled out by the police… Again, on their railways, the negro must travel in one miserable car only, the "Jim Crow car," in which all people of colour, refined or not, are expected to travel. They may pay first-class fare – it is all the same. And in the rougher districts of the South, a negro who did so far forget himself as to travel in any other compartment would speedily be hauled out and subjected to mob violence. A negro daren't as much as look at a white woman. On the other hand, there is no prescription against the meanest of the white travellers entering the "Jim Crow" compartment, and molesting or insulting negro girls and women travelling unprotected there. Miss Brown mentioned that on several occasions, while travelling in the Southern States, she had been warned to change the seat she occupied in the train, or to leave it altogether..."

She also described the convict lease system:

"Another wicked practice is the exploiting of negro prison labour. You have young negro boys and girls, convicted of trifling offences, which in Britain would be dealt with in a reformatory, sent to the workhouse. That is a very different institution to the workhouse of this country. It is really a jail. These young offenders are taken out to work by day at building, or road making, or so forth, and locked up again at night. "I have seen myself," Miss Brown said, "girls of 12 chained to hardened criminals, going out to break stones on the roads." This system, she went on to explain, cuts in two ways. In the first place, it affords a ready means of disfranchising the negro. In the second place, it gives the ruling class a supply of cheap convict labour… Then there is what is called the "convict lease system" – the hiring out of prison labour...."

=== Elocutionist ===
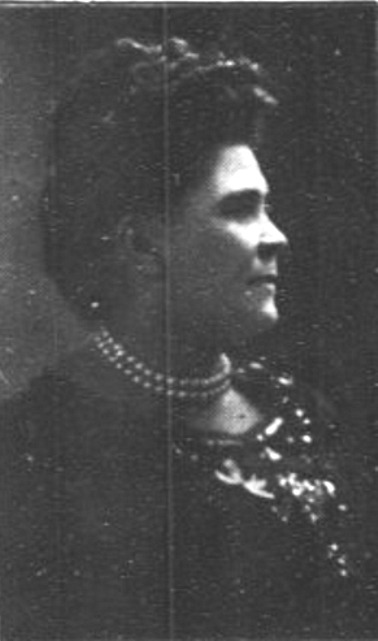
Hallie Brown, giving a speech at Poro College in 1920.

For several years she traveled with "The Wilberforce Grand Concert Company", an organization for the benefit of Wilberforce University. She read before hundreds of audiences, and tens of thousands of people. She possessed a magnetic voice, seeming to have perfect control of the muscles of the throat, and could vary her voice as successfully. As a public reader, Brown enthused her audiences. In her humorous selections, she often caused "wave after wave" of laughter; her pathetic pieces often moved her audience to tears.

=== Reformer and activist ===
In 1889, Brown delivered remarks on her belief in the abilities of Black women and the need for women teachers to help educate "this great nation of women" at a conference of the AME Church. In these remarks, she proposed that husbands support the education of their wives and the need for equal educational access for women. This is considered her debut as women's rights advocate, which included the right to vote.

In 1893, Brown presented a paper at the World's Congress of Representative Women in Chicago. In addition to Brown, four more African American women presented at the conference: Anna Julia Cooper, Fannie Barrier Williams, Fanny Jackson Coppin, and Sarah Jane Woodson Early.

Brown was a founder of the Colored Woman's League of Washington, D.C., which in 1896 merged into the National Association of Colored Women. She was president of the Ohio State Federation of Colored Women's Clubs from 1905 until 1912, and of the National Association of Colored Women from 1920 until 1924. She spoke at the Republican National Convention in 1924, and later directed campaign work among African-American women for President Calvin Coolidge. Brown was inducted as an honorary member of Delta Sigma Theta.

== Death ==
Brown died of coronary thrombosis on September 16, 1949, in Wilberforce, Ohio. Two buildings are named in her honor: the Hallie Q. Brown Memorial Library and our Community Center.

== Authored works ==
- Bits and Odds: A Choice Selection of Recitations (1880)
- First Lessons in Public Speaking (1920)
- Tales My Father Told Me, and Other Stories (1925)
- Homespun Heroines and Other Women of Distinction, with introduction by Josephine Turpin Washington (1926)
  - Includes short biographies of African-American women
