= Benjamin F. Lee =

American religious leader (1841–1926)

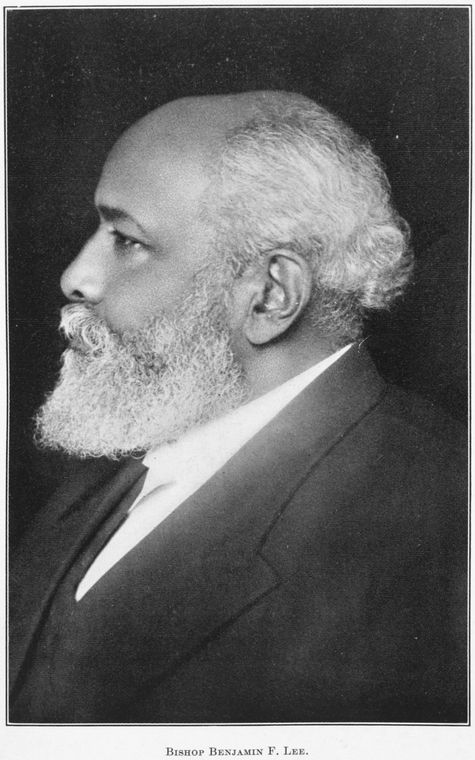
- Lee in 1912
- Born: September 18, 1841; Bridgeton, New Jersey
- Died: March 12, 1926 (aged 84); Wilberforce, Ohio
- Education: Wilberforce University
- Occupations: Minister, educator, journalist
- Political party: Republican

Religious life
- Religion: African Methodist Episcopal

Benjamin Franklin Lee (September 18, 1841 – March 12, 1926) was a religious leader and educator in the United States. He was the president of Wilberforce University from 1876 to 1884. He was editor of the Christian Recorder from 1884 to 1892. He was then elected a bishop in the African Methodist Episcopal (AME) church, serving from 1892 until his resignation in 1921, becoming senior bishop in the church in 1915.

== Early life ==
Lee was born September 18, 1841, to Abel and Sarah Lee in Bridgeton, New Jersey. Among Lee's relatives was Theophilus G. Steward a cousin who would also be an AME church leader. Abel died when Benjamin was about ten and he was raised by a relative, and his mother died April 1, 1852. As a youth he was employed on farms, attending schools in the winter. In November 1864 he enrolled in night classes at Wilberforce University, and he became a full student in 1865, graduating with an A. B. in 1872. He was noted for paying for school by manual labor work and teaching. He also received support from Hannah McDonald, a sister-in-law to Bishop Daniel Payne, who was the university's president. Lee also had a religious calling, joining the African Methodist Episcopal church in 1862, licensed to preach in 1868, ordained deacon in 1870 and elder in 1872. In 1868 he was appointed pastor to the Salem Circuit between Salem, Ohio, and Bridgewater, Pennsylvania, and over the next few years he worked as a missionary in parts of Kentucky and Ohio. In 1872 he took a position as pastor of a church in Frankfort, Kentucky.

== Family ==
In 1873 he married Mary E. Ashe of Mobile, Alabama. Mary also graduated from Wilberforce and was a celebrated writer, noted for her poem "Afmerica" and writings in theA. M. E. Review. Their children include noted writer Effie Lee Newsome, Sarah Lee, Frances "Addie" Lee, Benjamin F. Lee Jr, and Consuelo Lee. Sarah and Addie also became teachers at Wilberforce.

== Wilberforce ==
In 1873 he returned to Ohio where he was appointed chair of pastoral theology, homiletics, and ecclesiastical history at Wilberforce after the resignation of T. H. Jackson. In 1875, he moved to become pastor of the AME church in Toledo, Ohio. He returned to Wilberforce in 1876, taking the position of University president upon the resignation of Bishop Payne. He held the position for eight years, and in 1884 he resigned to take the position of editor of the AME Church's official paper, the Christian Recorder. Lee was replaced at Wilberforce by Samuel T. Mitchell, after the first choice, John G. Mitchell refused. In this, he replaced Benjamin Tucker Tanner, who went on to edit the then new A. M. E. Review.

== AME leadership ==
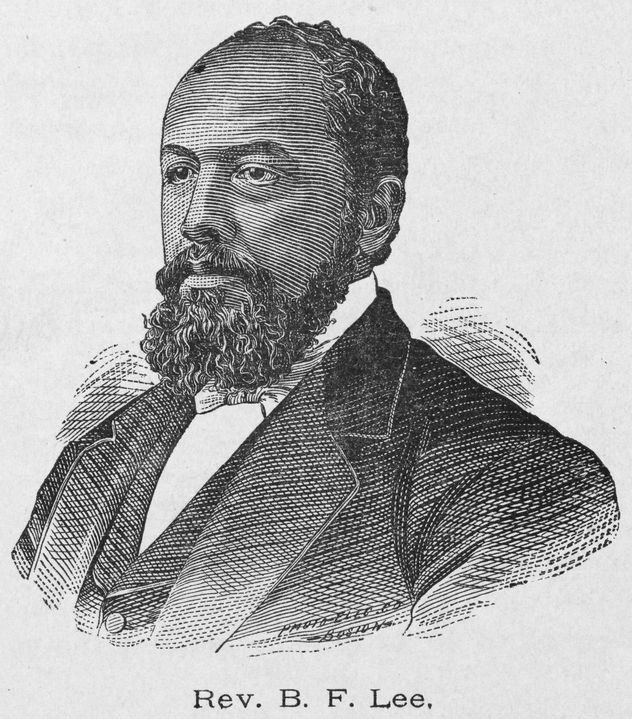
Lee in 1887

Lee was a prominent member of the AME church. He was a member of the AME general conference in 1876 and 1880 and a delegate elect to its session in 1884 in Baltimore. In 1880 he was elected by the AME general conference as a delegate to the Ecumenical Council of Methodists. In 1880, Lee was a candidate for the position of AME bishop. His candidacy was criticized by John Wesley Cromwell as Cromwell felt Lee's candidacy was based on Lee's position and popularity and not on his merit. In 1890, Booker T. Washington criticized the black church, stating that too many black preachers were unqualified, estimating that two-thirds of Baptist and Methodist clergy were mentally and morally unfit. Payne gave Washington his support, but many others opposed Washington, led by Lee and Theophilus G. Steward. Lee was again a delegate to the general conference in 1888 and 1892.

In 1892, Bishops Richard Randolph Disney and Jabez Pitt Campbell died and Lee, Moses B. Salter, and James A. Handy were elected to the position. H. T. Johnson replaced Lee as editor of the Recorder. He was ordained bishop in Philadelphia by Payne, Wesley John Gaines, and Abraham Grant, and was appointed to the tenth Episcopal district, which included parts of Texas, Louisiana, California, Washington, Oregon, Nevada, and Western Canada. At the general conference in 1896 he was transferred to the third Episcopal District including parts of Ohio and Pennsylvania. This brought him back to Ohio. He would later be transferred to the twelfth, seventh, second, fourth, and ninth district. When Bishop Benjamin W. Arnett died in 1906, he was elected secretary of the AME Bishops' Council. When Bishop Turner died in 1915, Lee became the senior bishop of the AME church.

He also served as president of the Wilberforce University board of trustees, president of Payne's Theological Seminary, president of the Corresponding School of Theology of the Church, and president of the AME church board of education.

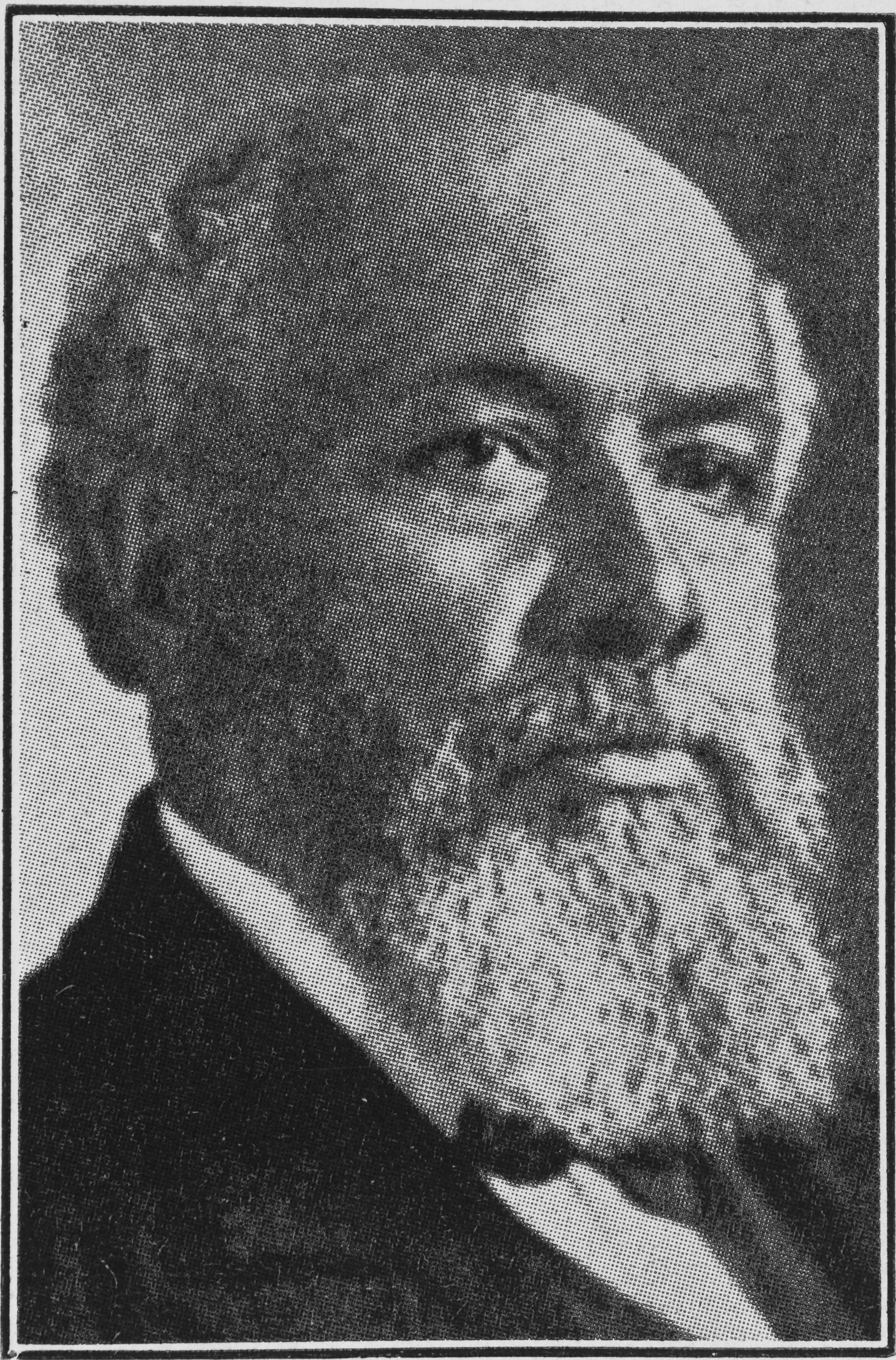
Lee in 1921

Lee retired from active work in the church in about 1921.

== Positions and influence ==
Lee advocated black southerners to remain in the south rather than take part in the Great Migration wherein blacks moved from the rural south to the urban North. Lee has been criticised for that position, with historian Milton Sernett stating that Lee's position as AME Church bishop gave him a conflict of interest since declining populations of blacks in the South would weaken the church there.

In 1908, Lee ordained future AME bishop, John Henry Clayborn, elder in Camden, Arkansas.

He wrote numerous articles, books, and pamphlets, including "Wesley, the Worker" and "Causes of Success of Methodism".

== Death and legacy ==
Lee died at his home in Wilberforce, Ohio, on March 12, 1926. He was buried March 9 in Wilberforce.

The B. F. Lee Theological Seminary and B. F. Lee Theological Seminary Building at Edward Waters College was built from 1925 to 1927 to house the schools Theological Department. The building was designed by Seminary graduate George Edward Curry, who would later himself be an AME bishop.

== Sources ==
- Seraile, William. Fire in His Heart: Bishop Benjamin Tucker Tanner and the AME Church. Univ. of Tennessee Press, 1998. ISBN 9781572330276
