= Francis Browne, 3rd Viscount Montagu =

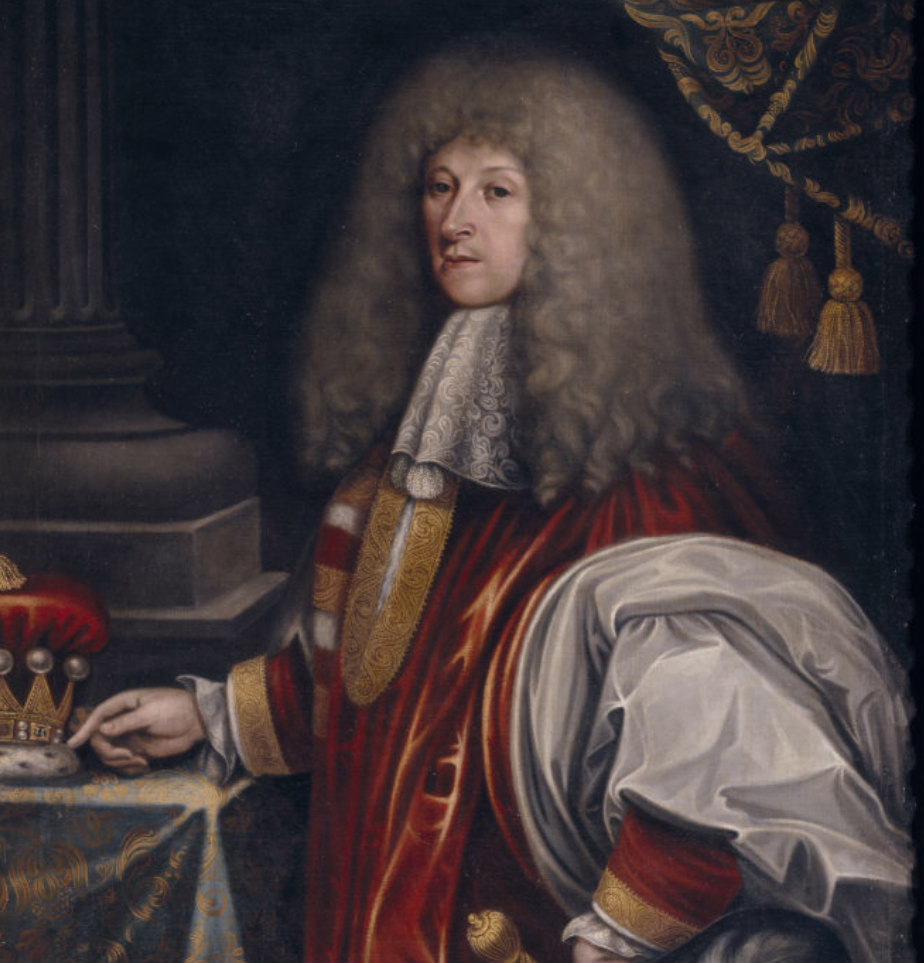
Lord Montagu

Francis Browne, 3rd Viscount Montagu (2 July 1610 – 2 November 1682) was the eldest son of Anthony-Maria Browne, 2nd Viscount Montagu and Jane Sackville, the daughter of Thomas Sackville, 1st Earl of Dorset.

He succeeded his father on 23 October 1629. His seat was the family home at Cowdray House and the estate included Easebourne Priory and Verdley. A plan of these commissioned by Browne, executed by cartographer Nicholas Lane in February 1635, is now held in the West Sussex Record Office. Browne also inherited the substantial park estate of Battle Abbey.

Browne married Lady Elizabeth Somerset (1618–1684), daughter of Henry Somerset, 1st Marquess of Worcester by licence on 6 July 1637. Julia Roundell, however, claimed that they were married prior to Francis succeeding the title and a first son, Anthony, was baptised at Battle Abbey in August 1629. Some sources claim that Anthony did not marry and predeceased his father without issue, but Roundell recounts another version, that Anthony argued with his father, moved to The Hague, returned at the outbreak of the English Civil War, married Bridgit Maskell of York, fought and was wounded at the Siege of York February 1644, had several children whose line later, unsuccessfully, lay claim to the title. Browne's other sons, Francis (1638 – April 1708) and Henry (c. 1640–1717), both succeeded in turn to become the 4th and 5th Viscounts Montagu, respectively. Their daughter, Elizabeth Browne (d. after 1686), married Christopher Roper, 5th Baron Teynham.

During the Civil War, Browne remained a staunch royalist and Catholic and had both land and possessions sequestrated as a result. Deprived of wealth and income, he was forced to divide and let out some of the estate at Battle.

Francis Browne, 3rd Viscount Montagu, died on 2 November 1682 aged 72.

Peerage of England
Preceded by Anthony-Maria Browne	Viscount Montagu; 1629–1682	Succeeded by Francis Browne
