= Frances Jane Scroggins Brown =

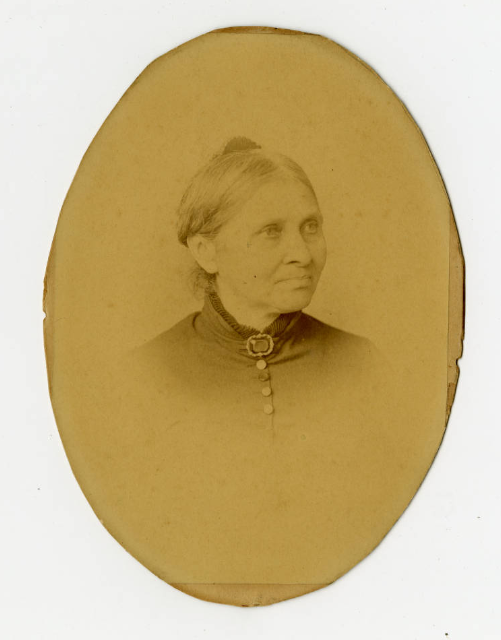
- Born: April 15, 1819; Winchester, Virginia, U.S.
- Died: April 16, 1914 (aged 95)
- Spouse: Thomas Arthur Brown (m. 1840)
- Children: 6, including Hallie Quinn Brown

Frances Jane Scroggins Brown (15 April 1819 – 16 April 1914) was an African American Underground Railroad station operator. Brown's daughter, Hallie Quinn Brown, co-founded the National Association of Colored Women (NACW).

== Early life ==
Frances Scroggins was born into slavery in Winchester County, Virginia, She was freed by one of her grandfathers - a white Revolutionary War officer and plantation owner. Scroggins worked as an indentured servant until her employer moved to Cincinnati, Ohio.

From around 1839, she boarded in the home of James Wilkerson, a freedman who ran a safehouse in the city. During this time, she witnessed enslavers attempting to capture those fleeing slavery, helping to secure their freedom. In one instance, an enslaver attempted to "claim" Scroggins, furious that she had helped an enslaved woman to escape through the Cincinnati network. Known for singing mournful songs by the roadside, Scroggins was called "Crazy Jane".

In about 1840 or 1841, she married Thomas Arthur Brown of Frederick County, Maryland, who purchased his freedom in 1843. Thomas Brown worked as a steward on the Mississippi River, and was said to have been the first black express agent in the nation.

== Underground Railroad ==
The couple settled in Pittsburgh, Pennsylvania, at a residence called Monongahela House. The Brown house in Pittsburgh became a frequent stop for enslaved people fleeing to Canada on the Underground Railroad. There, aided by a network including freedman physician Martin Robinson Delany and the Reverend Lewis Woodson, they offered food, shelter, and directions onward to safety.

In 1864, because of Frances' poor health, the family moved to Chatham, Ontario, Canada, returning to the US in 1870. The family then settled in Wilberforce, Ohio, where they built Homewood Cottage.

== Family and legacy ==
One of the Browns' six children, Hallie Quinn Brown, went on to become a prominent educator and elocutionist, who helped to pioneer African American women's clubs. In biographies of their daughter, the couple are described as having been "learned and passionate about education". Thomas Brown was known as the "walking encyclopedia", while Frances was said to have been very involved with Wilberforce University, where she acted as an unofficial counselor to students.

In Women of Ohio, it was written that:

Mr. and Mrs. Brown exerted a definite influence for good upon the community and “Ma” Brown, as she was affectionately called, lived serenely and did her alms quietly to the ripe age of ninety-five years.

In Front Line of Freedom, Keith P. Griffler numbered Frances Scroggins Brown as "among America’s forgotten children of the revolution", part of "the front line of the struggle against American slavery."

In 2023, Frances Scroggins Brown was included in The Day-Breakers, by poet Michael Fraser, which imagines the lives of Black soldiers who fought for the Union during the American Civil War.
