= Mary E. Ashe Lee =

African-American writer, educator, and churchwoman (1851–1932)

Mary Elizabeth Ashe Lee
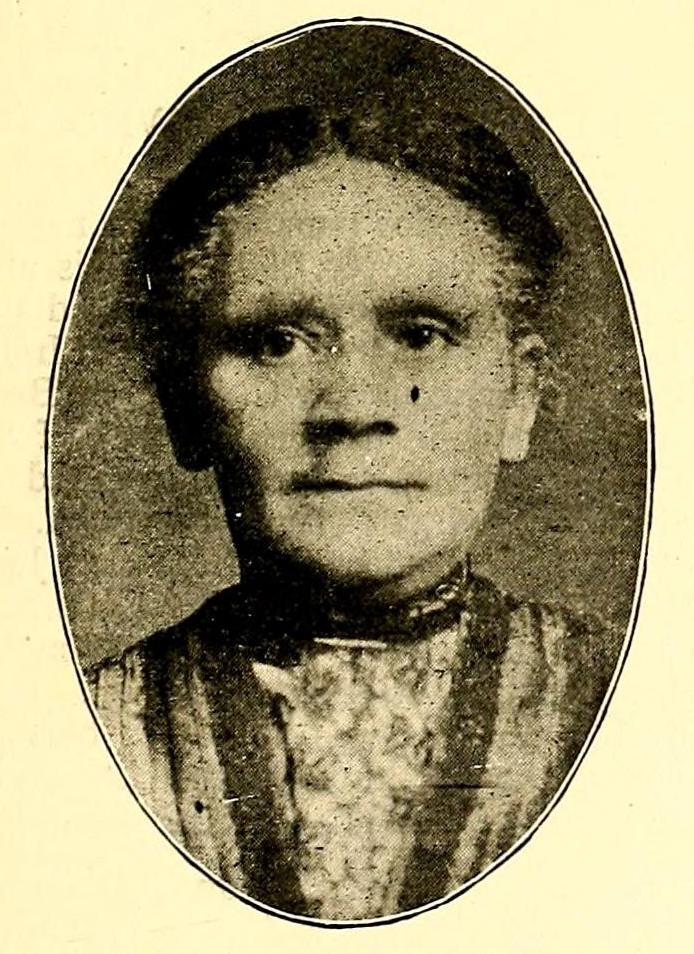
- Born: January 12, 1851; Mobile, Alabama, US
- Died: January 22, 1932 (aged 81)
- Resting place: Wilberforce, Ohio
- Education: Wilberforce University
- Occupations: Writer, educator, and churchwoman
- Spouse: Benjamin F. Lee (married 1872)

Mary Elizabeth Ashe Lee (12 January 1851 – 22 January 1932) was an African-American writer, educator, and churchwoman.

== Personal life ==
Mary Elizabeth Ashe was born in Mobile, Alabama on 12 January 1851, the daughter of Simon S. and Adelia M. Ashe. Her parents were comfortably off, and her father was prominent in business. In 1860 he purchased a farm in Ohio, near to Wilberforce University, where the family settled.

Mary graduated in science in 1873, alongside classmates including Hallie Quinn Brown. Recognised for her skill in writing, Ashe was appointed to write a "class ode", the first in the history of Wilberforce. Following graduation, she taught in public schools in Galveston, Texas, having previously taught two years in Mobile.

On 30 December 1872, Mary married Benjamin F. Lee, Professor of Pastoral Theology at Wilberforce, and later its president. He became Bishop of the African Methodist Episcopal Church. The couple had six children. Mary E. Ashe Lee was involved with the Ladies' Christian Union Association, the Woman's Christian Temperance Union, and the Women's Mite Missionary Society.

Lee died on 22 January 1932, and was buried in Stevenson Cemetery, Wilberforce, Ohio.

== Writing ==
Mary E. Ashe Lee contributed several articles to the Christian Recorder and to the A.M.E. Quarterly Review. She also edited a column in Ringwood's Journal, a fashion paper, called the "King's Daughters' Column". In 1892, she was elected vice president of the journal.

Lee's best known poem was "Afmerica", originally published in 1886 in Hampton Institute's Southern Workman. In 1998, an extract was part of Nineteenth-century American Women Poets: An Anthology, which called it "remarkable and powerful". In 2017, the poem was republished in The Portable Nineteenth-Century African American Women Writers. Co-editor and academic Hollis Robbins said of "Afmerica":

It's a remarkable poem, insisting upon the central role of black women in the making of America, as if she's talking to Tocqueville directly.

Paula Bennett has written that the publication of "Afmerica" in Southern Workman represented "a rare departure from its usually conservative approach to racial and social questions", as the poem "confronts one of the nineteenth century’s most controversial social issues, “amalgamation,” or the sexual mixing of whites with peoples of color."
