= Francis Browne, 4th Viscount Montagu =

English peer

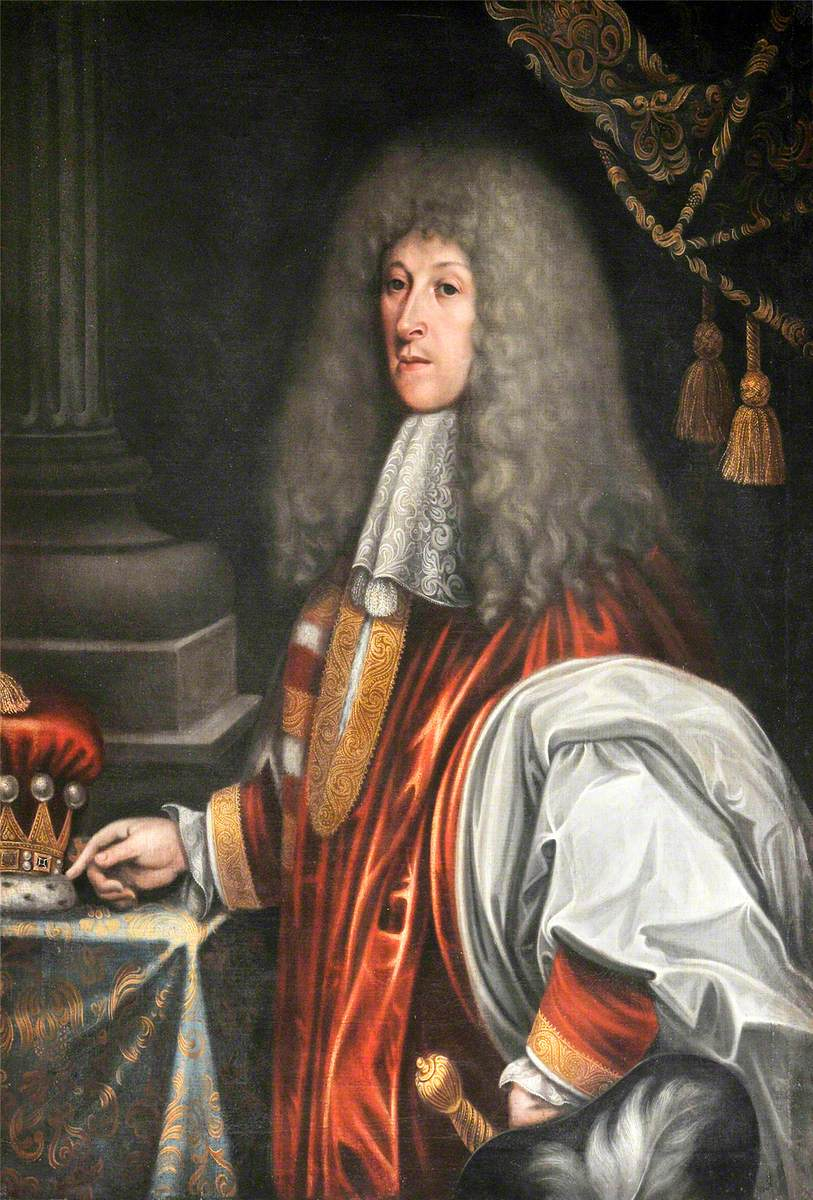
A portrait of Francis Browne, 4th Viscount Montagu

Francis Browne, 4th Viscount Montagu (1638 – June 1708) from 1656 to 1682, was an English peer.

== Early life and career ==
He was the eldest son of Francis Browne, 3rd Viscount Montagu and his wife Lady Elizabeth Somerset, daughter of Henry Somerset, 1st Marquess of Worcester.

Browne succeeded his father as Viscount Montagu in 1682, and served as assistant cupbearer at the coronation of James II of England in 1685. In February 1688, he was appointed Lord Lieutenant of Sussex to replace Charles Sackville, 6th Earl of Dorset, who had refused to put the "Three Questions" to the Sussex bench (to see if they would favor repeal of the Test and Penal Acts against Catholics). However, when the Glorious Revolution broke out, Montagu was ousted from the lieutenancy and replaced by Dorset again.

== Personal life ==
Montagu married Lady Mary Herbert, daughter of William Herbert, 1st Marquess of Powis. They had no children, and when he died in June 1708, he was succeeded by his younger brother Henry.

Honorary titles
Preceded by The Earl of Dorset	Lord Lieutenant of Sussex; 1688	Succeeded by The Earl of Dorset
Peerage of England
Preceded by Francis Browne	Viscount Montagu; 1682–1708	Succeeded by Henry Browne
