= Theophilus Gould Steward =

American novelist

Theophilus Gould "T.G." Steward
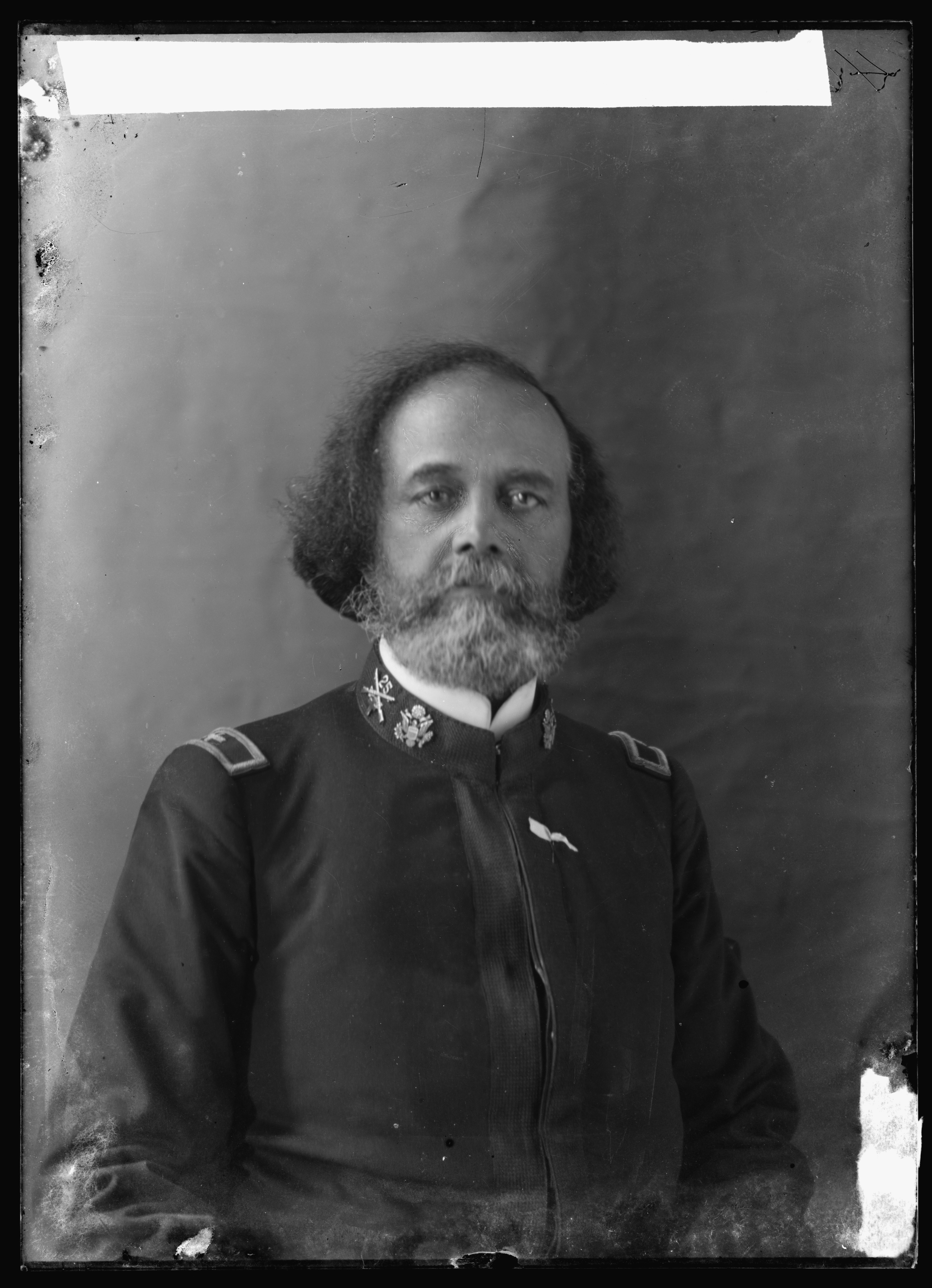
- Born: April 17, 1843; Gouldtown, New Jersey, United States
- Died: January 11, 1924 (aged 80); Wilberforce, Ohio, United States
- Burial place: Gouldtown Memorial Park; Gouldtown, Cumberland, New Jersey
- Relatives: Susan Smith McKinney (wife)
- Military career
- Allegiance: United States
- Branch: United States Army
- Rank: Captain
- Unit: 25th U.S. Colored Infantry
- Other work: Author, educator, clergyman

Theophilus Gould "T.G." Steward (April 17, 1843 – January 11, 1924) was an American author, educator, and clergyman. He was a U.S. Army chaplain and Buffalo Soldier of 25th U.S. Colored Infantry.

== Life and career ==
=== Early years ===
Steward was born to James Steward and Rebecca Gould in Gouldtown, New Jersey. The son of free Blacks reared in a family that stressed education, he received his formal education in the Gouldtown public schools.

=== Career ===
Steward was ordained a minister in the African Methodist Episcopal Church in 1863. Following the Civil War, Steward helped organize the A.M.E. Church in South Carolina and Georgia. He was also active in Reconstruction politics in Georgia.

Steward moved from South Carolina to pastor the AME church in Macon, Georgia March 17, 1868. After the church was burned in a mysterious fire, he helped build a new AME church. The cornerstone was laid January 16, 1870 in the presence of 2,000 black Maconites. After the war he graduated from the Episcopal Divinity School of Philadelphia, and later was awarded a Doctor of Divinity degree from Wilberforce University in Wilberforce, Ohio, in 1881.

From 1872 to 1891 Steward established a church in Haiti and preached in the eastern United States. In 1891 he joined the 25th U.S. Colored Infantry, serving as its chaplain until 1907, including service in Cuba during the Spanish–American War, and in the Philippines. He was a participant in the March 5, 1897 meeting to celebrate the memory of Frederick Douglass which founded the American Negro Academy led by Alexander Crummell.

From the founding of the organization until his death in 1924, Steward remained active among the scholars, editors, and activists of this first major African American learned society, refuting racist scholarship, promoting black claims to individual, social, and political equality, and studying the history and sociology of African American life. Between 1907 and his death on January 11, 1924, Steward was a professor of history, French, and logic at Wilberforce University.

=== Personal life ===
Steward was married to Elizabeth Gadsden (d. 1893) with whom he had eight sons: Frank Rudolph (b. 1872; Stephen Hunter (b. 1874), Theophilus Bolden (b. 1879), Charles, James, Benjamin, Walter, and Gustavus (b. 1883). His second wife was Dr. Susan Smith McKinney, the third African-American physician in the United States. He was a cousin to African Methodist Episcopal Church (AME) bishop Benjamin F. Lee.

== Bibliography ==
- Steward, T.G. (1885). Genesis Re-read. Philadelphia: A.M.E. Book Rooms. OCLC 23787616.
- Steward, T.G. (1877). Memoirs of Mrs. Rebecca Steward. Philadelphia: A.M.E. Church Publications. OCLC 182539662.
- Steward, T.G. (1897). Active Service, or Religious Work Among U.S. Soldiers. OCLC 48114600.
- Steward, T.G. (1899). A Charleston Love Story. New York: F. Tennyson Neely. OCLC 1593693.
- Steward, T.G. (1904). The Colored Regulars in the United States Army. Philadelphia: A.M.E. Book Concern. OCLC 1380129.
- Steward, William; Steward, T.G. (1913). Gouldtown: A Very Remarkable Settlement of Ancient Date. Philadelphia: J.B. Lippincott Co. OCLC 1441631.
- Steward, T.G. (1914). The Haitian Revolution, 1791 to 1804. New York: T.Y. Crowell Co. OCLC 23297934.
- Steward, T.G. (1920). Fifty Years in the Gospel Ministry. Philadelphia: A.M.E. Book Concern. OCLC 24557286.
- Steward, T.G. (1888). The End of the World; or, Clearing the Way for the Fullness of the Gentiles. Philadelphia: A.M.E. Church Book Rooms. OCLC 4090482.

== See also ==
- African-American firsts
