= H. T. Kealing =

American methodist educator (1859–1918)

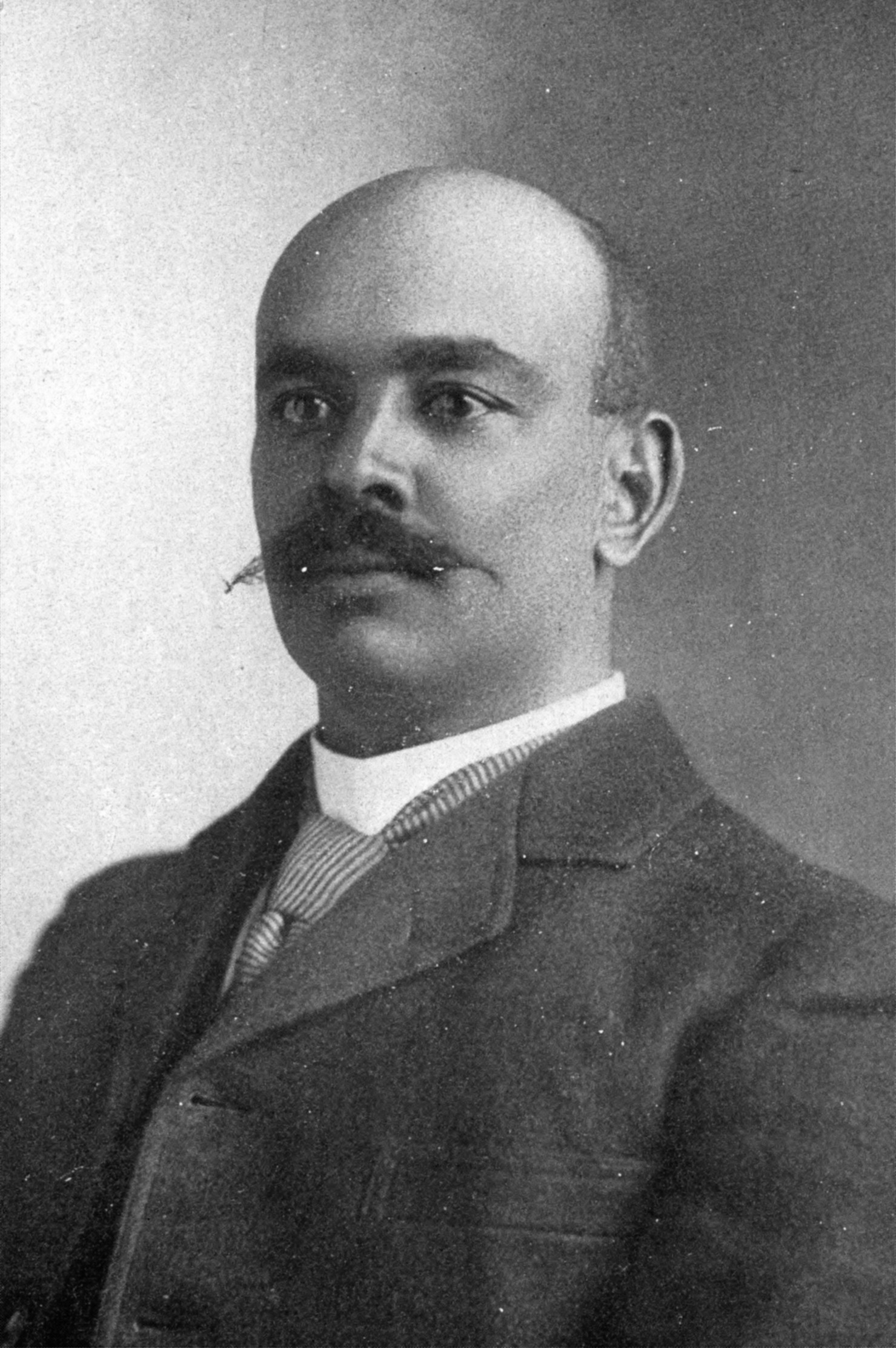
Hightower Theodore Kealing

Hightower Theodore Kealing, also known as H.T. Kealing (April 1, 1859 – February 25, 1918) was a writer, educator, and prominent member of the African Methodist Episcopal Church. Born as the son of former slaves, Kealing was among the first generation of African Americans to attend school during Reconstruction.

Kealing played a pivotal role in establishing the black education system in Austin, Texas, and in 1930, Austin ISD named its first black junior high in his honor.

== Early life and education ==
H.T. Kealing was born in Austin, Texas on April 1, 1859.

After completing his education in Austin public schools, Kealing enrolled in Straight University in New Orleans, Louisiana where he became a member of the African Methodist Episcopal (A.M.E.) Church in 1875.

At some point between 1875 and 1879, Kealing moved to Iowa and enrolled at the now defunct Tabor College where he graduated in 1881.

== Career as an educator ==
After graduating from Tabor College, Kealing moved to Waco, Texas, where he took on the role as University President of Paul Quinn College from 1881 to 1883.

Kealing moved back to Austin in 1884, to head the Robertson Hill School, the first school established for black children in Austin, in its inaugural year. In 1889, the Robertson Hill School added a high school department when black residents double-taxed themselves (at the time, public school funding was only allocated for white schools) and Kealing served as its first principal. In 1907, the Robertson Hill School was renamed Anderson High School.

At some point, between 1890 and 1895, Kealing stepped down as principal of the Robertson Hill School and began focusing more of his time advocating for freedmen and working within the A.M.E Church.

== A.M.E Church involvement and activism ==
In 1896, H.T. Kealing was appointed as the editor of the A.M.E Church Review, a quarterly publication still operating today that features "articles, book lists, reflections, sermons and lectures" related to the African Methodist Episcopal Church. He worked as the editor until 1912.

In 1901, Kealing traveled to London, England and was the African Methodist Episcopal Church’s spokesman at The Third Ecumenical Methodist Conference.

In 1903, one of Kealing's essays The Characteristics of The Negro People, was published in a book titled The Negro Problem: A Series of Articles by Representative American Negroes of Today. Other contributors to the book include Booker T. Washington, W.E.B DuBois, Paul Lawrence Dunbar, and Charles Chesnutt.

Kealing was also a member of the following organizations: National Educational Association, The American Negro Academy, The National Negro Business League, and the National Association for the Advancement of Colored People.

== Final years and legacy ==
In 1910, H.T. Kealing accepted an offer to serve as president of the now defunct Western University in Quindaro, Kansas, a role he held until his death on February 25, 1918. During his tenure as president, the University added a junior college and a school of religion.

In 1930, The City of Austin named its first black junior high in his honor.

Today, Kealing is known for serving in key leadership roles during the formation of Austin's black education system, his dedication to the A.M.E Church, and his commitment to the education of former slaves.
