= Easebourne Priory =

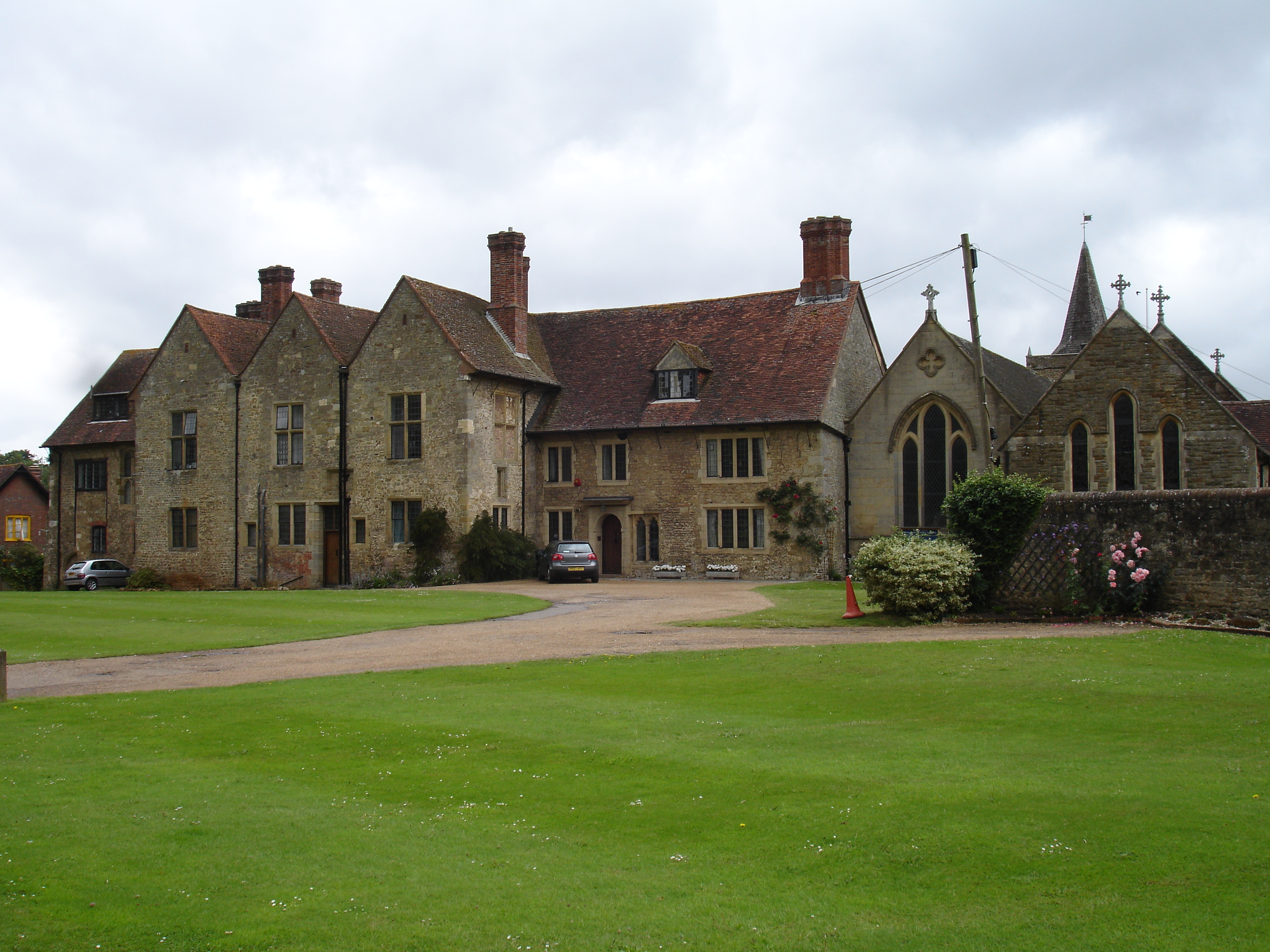
- Easebourne Priory

- Location within West Sussex

General information
- Type: Priory
- Location: Easebourne, West Sussex, England
- Coordinates: 50.995034°N 0.725849°W
- Inaugurated: c. 1238

The Priory of the Nativity of the Blessed Virgin Mary, commonly known as Easebourne Priory, was founded as a monastery of canonesses regular in the 13th-century in Easebourne, West Sussex, England. It was closed in the dissolution of the monasteries in 1536.

The priory was built for an Augustinian community consisting of a prioress and ten canonesses. It was founded before 1238 by the de Bohun family of St. Ann's Hill in nearby Midhurst, probably by John de Bohun who fought at Crecy.

It may have been refounded in the 15th century and became Benedictine.

In 1536, following the Dissolution of the Monasteries, Easebourne Priory was granted to William FitzWilliam, 1st Earl of Southampton, along with other properties,

Claustral remains are now incorporated into a Grade I listed house built on the south side of St Mary's church. The restored refectory is now in parochial use.

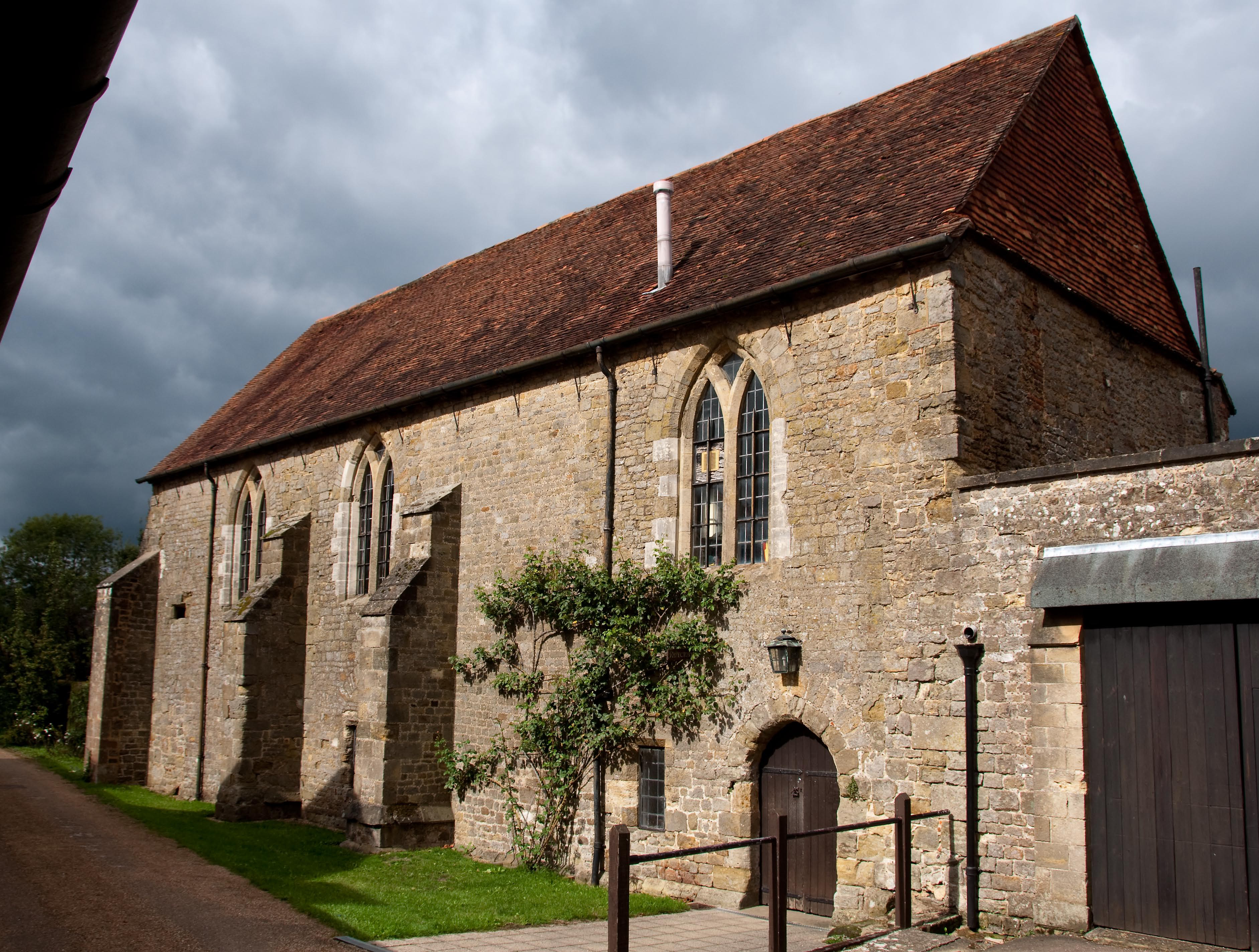
Easebourne Priory refectory

== Elizabeth I at Easebourne ==
Elizabeth I of England came to the Priory on 17 August 1591 from Cowdray House, as the guest of Anthony Browne, 1st Viscount Montagu, "where my lord himselfe kept house", and left on 20 August. An actor playing the part of a pilgrim led her to an oak tree where the heraldry of all the county was displayed, and a "wild man" dressed in ivy explained their loyalty to her. The next day, at a fishpond an actor dressed as an angler spoke with a "fisherman", then addressed the queen on the subject of loyalty The speeches and entertainments were printed later in the year.
