= Franklin Browne =

English cricketer (1873–1946)

Personal information
- Full name: Franklin Doughty Brown
- Born: 4 March 1873; Tufnell Park, London
- Died: 12 August 1946 (aged 73); Cobham, Kent (Note: Some sources give Browne's place of death as Ticehurst in Sussex. It is possible that the nursing home he died in was there and his residence was in Cobham. His Wisden obituary gives Cobham and this location has been used here.)
- Batting: Right-handed
- Role: Batsman

Domestic team information
- Years: Team
- 1899–1903: Kent
- FC debut: 1 June 1899 Kent v Marylebone Cricket Club (MCC)
- Last FC: 25 June 1903 Kent v Gentlemen of Philadelphia

Career statistics
Competition	First-class
Matches	10
Runs scored	262
Batting average	18/71
100s/50s	0/1
Top score	53*
Catches/stumpings	8/–
- Source: Cricinfo, 8 March 2017

Franklin Doughty Browne (4 March 1873 – 12 August 1946) was an English cricketer. He played in ten first-class matches for Kent County Cricket Club between 1899 and 1903.

== Early life ==
Browne was born at Tufnell Park in London in 1873, the son of George and Mary Browne (née Hill). His father was a solicitor, originally from Sheringham in Norfolk. Browne was educated at the Abbey School in Beckenham before moving up to Dulwich College, where he played cricket in the First XI from 1889 to 1892, as captain in his final year, and rugby union.

== Sporting and professional life ==
After leaving school, Browne went up to Trinity College, Oxford to study law, graduating with a Third Class degree in 1895. He did not play cricket for Oxford University, but did for his college, captaining the Trinity team in 1895. That year he scored 184 runs not out in a match against Balliol College, as Trinity scored 410 for five in reply to Balliol's 370 for seven. He was described as a free scoring batsman who could play the cut shot well. He followed his father into the law, and was articled as solicitor in 1903 in FC Matthews, Browne and Company, his father's firm. He became a partner in Irvine, Borrowman and Brown in 1904 and worked in a variety of firms throughout his life, at times with his brother Montague as a partner. He served as a Justice of the Peace at Gravesend.

Browne first played for Kent's Second XI in 1894, but did not play any first-class cricket until 1899. During that season he played club cricket for Beckenham Cricket Club, scoring four centuries during the season. He made his first-class debut against Marylebone Cricket Club (MCC) at Lord's at the beginning of June, scoring two and ten runs in his two innings, before playing again for the county later in the month, this time at Trent Bridge with Nottinghamshire as the opposition. He did not play first-class cricket again until 1901, when he appeared in seven matches for Kent, all in May and June. (Note: It was common for amateur cricketers such as Browne to play only when they were able to arrange time away from their workplace.) He scored a total of 214 runs at a batting average of 23.7, including scores of 32 and 53 not out during a match against MCC, the former in a partnership of 104 runs with Jack Mason for the fifth-wicket. Other notable scores during the season included 31 not out against the touring South Africans at Beckenham and 42 against Essex at Leyton.

Although he regularly played club cricket, Browne only made one further first-class appearance. In 1903, he appeared for Kent against the touring Gentlemen of Philadelphia at Beckenham. He was the secretary of Beckenham Cricket Club in 1904, and is known to have played cricket into the 1930s, appearing for MCC, of which he was a member. He also played field hockey for Old Alleynians.

== Family and later life ==
Another of Browne's brothers, Charles Walter Browne, also played cricket for Beckenham and hockey for Kent. Browne married twice. In 1905 to Mary Grenside, and, following her death, in 1918 he married Grace Russell at Putney. He lived at Cobham in 1946 and died there in a nursing home in 1946. He was aged 73.

== Bibliography ==
- Carlaw, Derek (2020). Kent County Cricketers, A to Z: Part One (1806–1914) (PDF). Cardiff: ACS.
