= Jabez Pitt Campbell =

Eighth bishop of the Methodist Episcopal Church

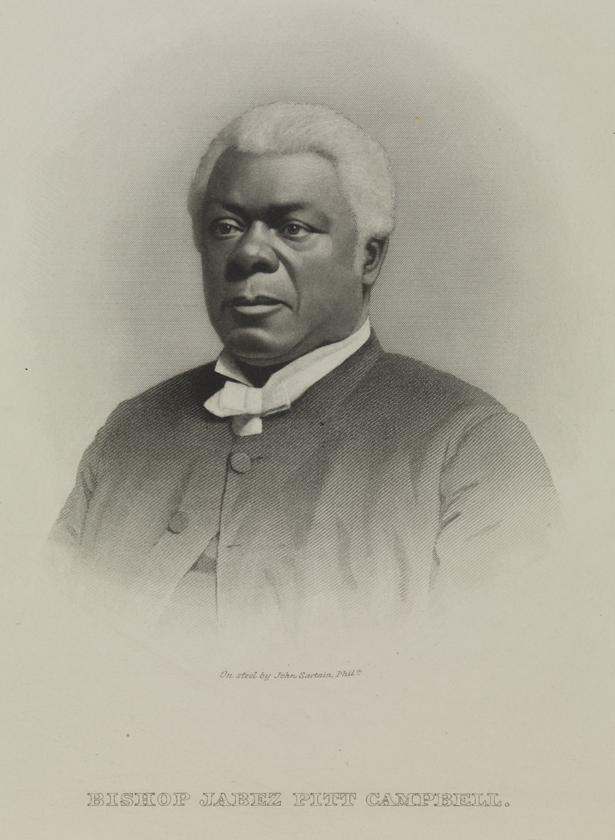
- Born: February 5, 1815; Slaughter Neck, Sussex County, Delaware
- Died: August 9, 1891 (aged 76)
- Occupation: Minister
- Known for: American Colonization Society; eighth bishop of the AME Church
- Spouse(s): Stella Medley; Mary Ann Akins

Religious life
- Religion: African Methodist Episcopal Church

Jabez Pitt Campbell (February 5, 1815 – August 9, 1891) was an American minister, activist, philanthropist and the eighth bishop of the African Methodist Episcopal Church (AME), the first independent African-American church in the United States.

== Early life ==
Jabez P. Campbell was born free in Slaughter Neck, Sussex County, Delaware on February 5, 1815. Both his grandfathers were soldiers during the Revolutionary War, a rare occurrence, since only about 5,000 African-Americans served in the Continental Army. His father was Anthony Campbell, a Methodist preacher, and his mother was Catherine Campbell, both of whom were members of the AME church. When Campbell was young, his father used him as collateral for his mortgage. At an early age, his father left him without paying his mortgage, leaving Campbell to be sold as a slave. Campbell heard of the attempt to enslave him and ran away to Philadelphia where his mother lived. Despite his attempted escape, Campbell was captured and enslaved for four and a half years. He was meant to serve two more years, but he bought them from his master, and at age eighteen he was free.

== Marriage and family ==
Campbell married twice. His first marriage was to Stella Medley on October 23, 1844. In April 1854, Stella Medley died. They had one child, Catherine Stella Campbell, in 1852. Campbell married again in 1855 to a widow, Mary Ann Akins. She was previously married to Joseph Shire and had four children with him. Akins and Campbell did not have any children together.

== Religion and ministry ==
In 1833, after a brief encounter with Christian Universalism and soon after being freed, Jabez Campbell joined Bethel Church, an AME church, in Philadelphia. In September 1839, Campbell was licensed to preach by the AME church. Bishop Morris Brown assigned Campbell to preach in the Frankford and Berks County circuits in Pennsylvania. From 1839 to 1843, he preached in the New England states. In 1843, Campbell became an ordained elder, and taught and preached in New York and Pennsylvania from that year until 1854. From 1855 to 1858, he was general book steward to the AME church and editor of the Christian Recorder, the official newspaper of the AME church. After resigning from these posts, he was assigned to Trenton in New Jersey and Bethel Church in Pennsylvania.

Jabez Campbell continued his religious service as a pastor in Baltimore and Philadelphia until May 1864, when he was elected eighth bishop of the AME church. As a bishop, Campbell set up both the Louisiana and California conferences in 1865. From 1864 to 1867, he worked primarily in Indiana, Missouri, California, and Louisiana. Campbell also set up the Ocean Grove Conference in New Jersey sometime in the 1880s.

== Politics and philanthropy ==
After John Brown's raid on Harpers Ferry (1859), Rev. Campbell requested in a letter the bodies of two persons, Shields Green and John Copeland, in the event that they would be hanged, from the Governor of Virginia. He condemned the raid as reckless, disapproving of violence in order to obtain freedom for the enslaved.

Campbell and his wife Mary both had life memberships to the Board of Managers of the Home for Aged and Infirm Colored Persons, an institution located in west Philadelphia. Although he gave money to various institutions, the biggest recipients were Wilberforce University and Jabez Pitt Campbell College, in Jackson, Mississippi. Campbell College was absorbed by what is now Jackson State University. Wilberforce University awarded him the honorary degree of Doctor of Divinity in 1876. The University of Pennsylvania also awarded him an honorary degree.

Campbell publicly criticized Lincoln for the slow emancipation of the slaves after the end of the Civil War.

Campbell was part of the American Colonization Society (ACS), an institution that encouraged the return of free African-Americans to Africa. In 1876 he was elected vice-president of the ACS. He also participated in the Colored National Convention held in Franklin Hall, Sixth Street, below Arch, Philadelphia, Pennsylvania on October 16, 17 and 18, 1855. He addressed the Convention, but the details of his speech are not known.

== Death ==
Rev. Jabez P. Campbell died in 1891.
