= Francis Harold Brown =

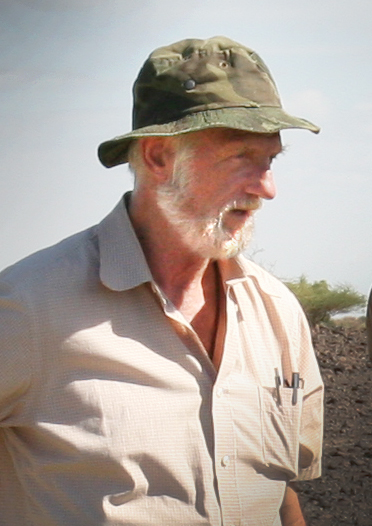
Frank Brown in Turkana, Kenya.

Francis Harold Brown (October 24, 1943 – September 30, 2017) was an American geologist and geochemist who mapped the sedimentary sequence and geology of most of the Turkana Basin in Kenya, east Africa. Brown introduced single-crystal argon-argon and potassium-argon dating into the Turkana Basin, resolving disputes over the age of Kenyanthropus platyops and other fossils.

== Early life ==
Brown was born in Willits, California, to Vivien Clarice Jameson Brown and carpenter and viticulturist Francis Edward Brown. As an undergraduate at the University of California, Berkeley, he studied chemistry, Latin and linguistics, rowed, and spent one obligatory year in the ROTC. Brown ultimately chose to pursue studies in geology and acquired his BA in 1965. He opposed the Vietnam war but reported to his draft board when he realized he had failed to register. Brown was not drafted.

After receiving his PhD from Berkeley, he took a faculty position at the University of Utah in the Geology Department where he met Theresa Bauhs The two were married on his family farm on October 20, 1973, and went on to have two children: Erica Joy Brown (1976), and Elise Bauhs Brown (1980).

== Early career in the Omo ==
Brown began his doctoral work at Berkeley studying under Garniss Curtis. In 1966 anthropologist Francis Clark Howell sent Brown to the Omo Valley in southern Ethiopia, to study the chronology of sediments there containing early hominin remains. Brown entered Ethiopia by land rover from Turkana, but became ill with malaria. He would later state that he became deeply attached to Kenyan culture after retracing his steps and finding help at the military outpost of Lokitaung. Brown continued work in the Omo until a military coup in 1974 forced researchers from Ethiopia. For a brief period after his work in Ethiopia, Brown served on a U.S. scientific delegation attempting to normalize relations with China.

== Research in Turkana ==
Brown worked to map sedimentary sequences in a number of neighboring countries including Kenya, Tanzania, Uganda, and Libya, and while studying geology in these different regions Brown observed that some volcanic tuffs were spread over vast geographic distances. In the course of his work Brown came to learn numerous East African languages including Swahili, Kikuyu, Amharic, Turkana and Daasanach. Brown was also an expert in the botany and history of the region.

At the request of paleoanthropologist Richard Leakey, Brown began collaborating closely with Richard, Meave Leakey, and geochemist Ian McDougall to date volcanic ash layers in sedimentary sequences in the Turkana Basin. Brown initially worked on the fossil-rich northeastern portions of the lake, and his work resolved difficulties that had arisen in the interpretation of sediments at Koobi Fora. The project of systematically mapping ash layers and documenting their chronology was conducted in collaboration with geochemist Thure Cerling. Brown's efforts helped to date important hominin fossils including the Australopithecus "Lucy", Turkana Boy, and the specimen Kenyanthropus platyops. Because of his work Brown was presented to Queen Elizabeth II in London in 1985.

== University of Utah ==
Brown became a professor of geology and geophysics at the University of Utah in 1971, and began to chair the department in 1988. Beginning in 1991, he served as dean of the University of Utah's college of mines and earth sciences for 25 years. In 2001 the university honored Brown with the Rosenblatt Prize for Excellence.

== See also ==
- Francis Clark Howell
- Thure E. Cerling
