= Wriothesley =

Wriothesley (pronounced /ˈraɪəθsli/ RY-əthss-lee) may refer to:

- William Wriothesley (died 1513), officer of arms at the College of Arms in London
- Thomas Wriothesley (died 1534), long-serving officer of arms at the College of Arms in London
- Thomas Wriothesley, 1st Earl of Southampton KG (1505–1550), English politician of the Tudor period
- Charles Wriothesley (1508–1562), long-serving officer of arms at the College of Arms in London
- Henry Wriothesley, 2nd Earl of Southampton (1545–1581), English noble
- Mary Wriothesley, Countess of Southampton (1552–1607), English countess
- Elizabeth Wriothesley, Countess of Southampton (1572–1655), chief lady-in-waiting to Elizabeth I of England
- Henry Wriothesley, 3rd Earl of Southampton (1573–1624), English noble
- Thomas Wriothesley, 4th Earl of Southampton KG (1607–1667), 17th-century English statesman, and supporter of Charles II
- Rachel Wriothesley, Lady Russell (1636–1723), English noblewoman, heiress, and author
- Baptist Wriothesley Noel (1799–1873), English evangelical clergyman of aristocratic family
- Wriothesley, a character in 2020 video game Genshin Impact

== See also ==
- Wriothesley Noel, 2nd Earl of Gainsborough (died 1690), English peer and Member of Parliament
- Wriothesley Russell, 2nd Duke of Bedford KG (1680–1711), the son of William Russell, Lord Russell and his wife Lady Rachel Wriothesley
- Wriothesley Russell, 3rd Duke of Bedford (1708–1732), the son of Wriothesley Russell, 2nd Duke of Bedford
