= Thomas Wriothesley (disambiguation) =

Thomas Wriothesley (died 1534) was an officer of arms at the College of Arms in London.

Thomas Wriothesley may also refer to:

- Thomas Wriothesley, 1st Earl of Southampton (1505–1550)
- Thomas Wriothesley, 4th Earl of Southampton (1607–1667)
