= Charles Wriothesley =

16th-century officer of arms at College of Arms

Charles Wriothesley (/ˈraɪəθsli/ REYE-əths-lee; 8 May 1508 – 25 January 1562) was a long-serving officer of arms at the College of Arms in London. He was the last member of a dynasty of heralds that started with his grandfather—Garter Principal King of Arms John Writhe.

== Personal life ==
Charles Wriothesley was a younger son of Thomas Wriothesley, who also became Garter King of Arms, and his wife, Jane Hall. His uncle, William Wriothesley, had also served at the College of Arms as York Herald. Charles Wriothesley was born in London on 8 May 1508. In 1511, he moved with his family into Garter House, which his father had built as an embodiment of the family's rise to fame. His father sent him to Cambridge to study law. He was being educated at Trinity Hall, Cambridge by 1522.

He seems to have married twice. His first wife was the daughter of a Mr Mallory. When he died at his lodgings London on 25 January 1562, however, there was no mention made of a wife or children in his funeral certificate. His fellow heralds paid for a splendid funeral. He was buried not in St Giles-without-Cripplegate, along with all the other members of his family, but in the middle aisle of St Sepulchre-without-Newgate. He left no will, and the great library of books that he had inherited from his father was sold after his death, many of its contents to Gilbert Dethick and his son William, the founders of a new heraldic dynasty.

== Heraldic career ==
In October 1524, one of the pursuivants at the College of Arms was promoted to replace a senior herald that had died. This gave the Wriothesley family a chance to extend their dynasty. At age 16, Wriothesley was appointed Rouge Croix Pursuivant. His appointment was made formal by letters patent on 29 May 1525 with the annual salary of £10. Shortly after this appointment, Wriothesley resumed his interrupted legal training. In 1529 he became a gentleman of Gray's Inn.

In the early 1530s, Wriothesley reached the peak of his career as an officer of arms. He was a part of the ceremony that created Anne Boleyn as Marquess of Pembroke in 1532. He also attended her coronation the following year. The death of Thomas Wriothesley on 24 November 1534 set a series of promotions at the College of Arms into motion. Thomas Wall was made Garter King of Arms, and Charles was made Windsor Herald of Arms in Ordinary. Wriothesley's work as a herald seems to have been undistinguished, and he plainly did not prosper. When Thomas Wall died in 1536, after only two years' tenure as Garter, Wriothesley found himself overlooked for the promotion to his father's and grandfather's office. Even the succession of his cousin Thomas, Baron Wriothesley, to the Lord Chancellorship does not seem to have improved his prospects. When Christopher Barker died in 1550 Wriothesley was again passed over for promotion to Garter. His name appears in the charter of 1554 whereby King Philip and Queen Mary I established the heralds and their successors as a corporation with perpetual succession and granted them the house called Derby Place in which to keep safe their records and rolls and all things touching their faculty.

== Wriothesley's Chronicle ==
A Chronicle of England During the Reigns of the Tudors, From A.D. 1485 to 1559, better known as Wriothesley's Chronicle, was written during the reigns of Henry VIII, Edward VI, Mary I, and Elizabeth I. This chronicle of English affairs, detailing the accession of Henry VII to the first year of the reign of Elizabeth I, edited by William Douglas Hamilton, was published in two volumes, by the Camden Society in 1875.

== See also ==
- Heraldry
- King of arms
