= John Mynne =

English officer of arms

John Mynne was an English officer of arms. He was the son of Henry Mynne of Gloucestershire, and son-in-law of John Writhe, the Garter King of Arms from 1478 to 1504.

== Heraldic career ==
It has been claimed that Mynne was York Herald under Henry VII, but this is disputed. Noble lists him as York Herald, on the authority of Thomas Wriothesley's pedigrees, but neither Anstis nor the Herald's visitation of Gloucestershire lists him as York Herald.

Mynne's coat of arms was "Gules, on a chevron engrailed Or between three fleurs de lis Argent, three chessrooks Sable".

== Personal life ==
Mynne was originally from Windrush in Gloucestershire, the son of Henry Mynne. He married Catherine, a daughter of John Writhe, and is mentioned in Writhe's will. It is probable that John Mynne was also related to Anne Mynne, the third wife of John Writhe. Mynne had two daughters: Eleanor, who married Nicholas Cutler of Eye, MP, and was the mother of Frances Cutler who married William Honnyng; and Catherine, who married - Calthrope.

== Arms ==
Coat of arms of John Mynne
Escutcheon Gules, on a chevron engrailed or between 3 fleurs de lis argent 3 chessrooks sable.

== See also ==
- Herald

== Sources ==
- John Anstis. The Register of the Most Noble Order of the Garter. (London, 1724).
- Mark Noble, A History of the College of Arms. (London, 1805).
- Visitation of Gloucestershire, 1623 (Harleian Society)
- Survey of London (London, 1905) - entry for the College of Arms
- History of Parliament (London 1982) - entry for Nicholas Cutler
- "Wriothesley, John" . Dictionary of National Biography. London: Smith, Elder & Co. 1885–1900.
