= Roger Machado =

Roger Machado may refer to:

- Roger Machado (baseball) (born 1974), Cuban baseball player
- Roger Machado (officer of arms) (died 1510), English officer of arms
- Roger Machado (footballer) (born 1975), Brazilian football player
