= Richard Lyster =

English judge (c.1480–1554)

Sir Richard Lyster (c. 1480 – 14 March 1554) was an English judge and Chief Justice of the King's Bench.

== Origins and early career ==
Sir Frederick Madden in his "Remarks on the Monument of Sir Richard Lyster in St. Michael's Church Southampton," describes both the judge's grandfather, Thomas, and his father, John, as of Wakefield in Yorkshire. His mother was a daughter of Beaumont of Whitley in the same county. He had his legal training in the Middle Temple, where he arrived at the dignity of reader in Lent, 1516, and of double-reader in Lent, 1522, and he was appointed treasurer of the society in the following year.

== Professional advancement ==
Of his early professional employment there is no account, the year books and other reports entirely omitting his name; but that he had acquired considerable legal eminence may be concluded from his being placed in the office of solicitor-general on 8 July 1521. He was succeeded in this post by Christopher Hales on 14 August 1525; and although he is not introduced into the list of attorneys general in Dugdale's Chronica Series, there is little doubt that he then followed Ralph Swillington in that office; as he is mentioned with the title in the will of Cicily Marchioness of Dorset, dated 6 May 1527; and as Christopher Hales was made attorney-general immediately after Lyster's elevation to the bench as chief baron of the Exchequer on 12 May 1529, apparently as his successor. On his promotion he was knighted and was named as a commissioner on the trials both of Bishop Fisher and Sir Thomas More; but he does not appear to have taken any prominent part in either.

== Chief Justice of the King's Bench ==
After presiding in the Exchequer above sixteen years, he was advanced to the office of chief justice of the King's Bench on 9 November 1545; and in this character he attested the submission and confession of Thomas Duke of Norfolk on 12 January 1547, a fortnight before the king's death. On the accession of Edward VI he was reappointed, and his first duty on the Thursday after was to address a batch of new serjeants on their inauguration at Lincoln's Inn. This he did, as the reporter significantly says, in "a godly thowghe sumwhate prolix and long declaration of their duties and exhortation to their full following and execution of the same." He resigned at the end of the first five years of the reign on 21 March 1552, when he was succeeded by Sir Roger Cholmeley.The remainder of his life he spent at his mansion in Southampton, which John Leland describes as being "very fair"; and dying on 14 March 1554, where he was buried in St. Michael's Church.

== Family and legacy ==
By the inquisition after his death taken at Andover, he was found to be possessed of eleven manors in the counties of Hampshire and Surrey, together with various other lands and tenements. His monument represents him in scarlet robes (the colour of which has now disappeared), with a collar of S. S. round his breast, a judge's cap on his head, and a book in his hand. A part of the inscription remains which records its erection by his widow Elizabeth. This lady, who was a daughter of – Stoke, was his third wife.

His first wife, and the mother of his children, Elizabeth and Michael, is currently unknown. His daughter Elizabeth was married to Sir Richard Blount, and his son Michael, knight of the Bath, married Margery Horsman and died in his father's lifetime, leaving a son Richard, who married Mary the second daughter of Lord Chancellor Wriothesley and widow of Sir William Shelley of Michelgrove. His second wife was Isabel, the daughter of Sir Ralph Shirley of Winstneston, Sussex, and the widow of Sir John Dawtrey of Southampton who died in 1517. Isabel was still married to Sir John when Richard Lyster's daughter Elizabeth was born in 1510 and who at sixteen married Richard Blount in 1527. Isabel is also often mistaken for her sister, Jane Shirley, wife of John Dawtrey of Petworth. Isabel is probably the subject of the drawing by Hans Holbein the younger in the Royal Collection. His third wife was another Elizabeth and she is the one who was responsible for his memorial in St Michael's Church.

== Notes ==
Attribution

'

Political offices
Preceded by Unknown	Custos Rotulorum of Wiltshire bef. 1544–1554	Succeeded by Sir Thomas Gargrave
Preceded by Unknown	Custos Rotulorum of the West Riding of Yorkshire bef. 1544 – aft. 1547	Succeeded by Sir John Thynne
Legal offices
Preceded by John Port	Solicitor General; 1521–1525	Succeeded by Christopher Hales
Preceded by Ralph Swillington	Attorney General; 1525–1529	Succeeded by Christopher Hales
Preceded by Sir Richard Broke	Lord Chief Baron of the Exchequer; 1529–1545	Succeeded by Sir Roger Cholmeley
Preceded by Sir Edward Montagu	Chief Justice of the King's Bench; 1545–1552	Succeeded by Sir Roger Cholmeley
