= Attorney General for England and Wales =

British law officer of the Crown

United Kingdom His Majesty's Attorney General for England and Wales
- Royal Arms of His Majesty's Government

- Incumbent; Ellie Reeves since 20 July 2026
- Attorney General's Office
- Style: Attorney General(informal); The Right Honourable (within the UK and Commonwealth)
- Member of: Cabinet (attending); Privy Council; National Security Council
- Reports to: The Monarch; Prime Minister of the United Kingdom; Secretary of State for Justice
- Nominator: Prime Minister
- Appointer: The Monarch; (on the advice of the Prime Minister)
- Term length: At His Majesty's pleasure
- Formation: 1277
- First holder: William de Boneville
- Deputy: Solicitor General for England and Wales
- Salary: £178,594 per annum (2022) (including £84,144 MP salary)
- Website: gov.uk/government/ministers/attorney-general

His Majesty's Attorney General for England and Wales (Welsh: Twrnai Cyffredinol Lloegr a Chymru) is the chief legal adviser to the Sovereign and Government in affairs pertaining to England and Wales, and is the most senior law officer of the UK Government. The attorney general is the leader of the Attorney General's Office and currently attends (but is not a member of) the Cabinet. Unlike in other countries employing the common law legal system, the attorney general does not govern the administration of justice; that function is carried out by the Secretary of State for Justice and Lord Chancellor. The incumbent is also concurrently the Advocate General for Northern Ireland.

The position of Attorney General dates back to at least 1243, when records indicate that a professional attorney was appointed to represent the King's interests in court. The position first took on a political role in 1461 when the holder of the office was summoned to the House of Lords to advise the Government there on legal matters. In 1673, the attorney general officially became the Crown's adviser and representative in legal matters, although still specialising in litigation rather than advice. The beginning of the 20th century saw a shift away from litigation and more towards legal advice. Today, prosecutions are carried out by the Crown Prosecution Service (CPS) and most legal advice to government departments is provided by the Government Legal Department, both under the supervision of the attorney general.

Additional duties include superintending the Serious Fraud Office, HM Crown Prosecution Service Inspectorate, Service Prosecuting Authority, and other government lawyers with the authority to prosecute cases. The attorney general advises the government, individual government departments, and individual government ministers on legal matters, answering questions in Parliament and bringing "Unduly lenient" sentences and points of law to the Court of Appeal of England and Wales. As per the Law Officers Act 1997, duties can be delegated to the Solicitor General, and any actions are treated as if they came from the attorney general.

The corresponding shadow minister is the Shadow Attorney General for England and Wales, who scrutinises the work of the attorney general alongside the Justice Select Committee.

== History ==
The origins of the office are unknown, but the earliest record of an "attorney of the crown" is from 1243, when a professional attorney named Laurence Del Brok was paid to prosecute cases for the king, who could not appear in courts where he had an interest. During the early days of the office the holder was largely concerned with representing the Crown in litigation, and held no political role or duties. Although a valuable position, the attorney general was expected to work incredibly hard; although Francis North (1637–1685) was earning £7,000 a year as attorney general he was pleased to give up the office and become Chief Justice of the Common Pleas because of the smaller workload, despite the heavily reduced pay. The office first took on a political element in 1461, when the holder was summoned by writ to the House of Lords to advise the government on legal matters. This was also the first time that the office was referred to as the office of the "Attorney General". The custom of summoning the attorney general to the Lords by writ when appointed continues unbroken to this day, although until the appointment of Lord Williams of Mostyn in 1999, no attorney general had sat in the Lords since 1700, and no attorney general had obeyed the writ since 1742.

During the 16th century, the attorney general was used to pass messages between the House of Lords and House of Commons, although he was viewed suspiciously by the Commons and seen as a tool of the Lords and the king. In 1673 the attorney general began to take up a seat in the House of Commons, and since then it has been convention to ensure that all attorneys general are members of the House of Commons or House of Lords, although there is no requirement that they be so. During the constitutional struggle centred on the Royal Declaration of Indulgence in 1672 and 1673 the attorney general officially became the Crown's representative in legal matters.

In 1890, the ability of an attorney general to continue practising privately was formally taken away, turning the office-holder into a dedicated representative of the government. Since the beginning of the twentieth century the role of the attorney general has moved away from representing the Crown and government directly in court, and it has become more of a political and ministerial post, with the attorney general serving as a legal adviser to both the government as a whole and individual government departments. Despite this change, until the passing of the Homicide Act 1957 the attorney general was bound to prosecute any and all poisoning cases.

However, in recent times the attorney general has exceptionally conducted litigation in person before the courts, for instance before the House of Lords in A and Others v Secretary of State for the Home Department, where the legality of the government's detention of terrorist suspects at Belmarsh was at issue.

== Role and duties ==
The attorney general is currently not a cabinet minister, but is designated as also attending Cabinet. The rule that no attorney general may be a cabinet minister is a political convention rather than a law, and for a short period of time the attorney general did sit in cabinet, starting with Sir Rufus Isaacs in 1912 and ending with Douglas Hogg in 1928. There is nothing that prohibits attorneys general from attending meetings of the Cabinet, and on occasion they have been asked to attend meetings to advise the government on the best course of action legally. Despite this, it is considered preferable to exclude attorneys general from cabinet meetings so as to draw a distinct line between them and the political decisions on which they are giving legal advice. As a government minister, the attorney general is directly answerable to Parliament.

The attorney general is also the chief legal adviser of the Crown and its government, and has the primary role of advising the government on any legal repercussions of their actions, either orally at meetings or in writing. As well as the government as a whole, they also advise individual departments. Although the primary role is no longer one of litigation, the attorney general still represents the Crown and government in court in some select, particularly important cases, and chooses the Treasury Counsel who handle most government legal cases. By convention, they represent the government in every case in front of the International Court of Justice. The attorney general also superintends the Crown Prosecution Service and appoints its head, the Director of Public Prosecutions. Decisions to prosecute are taken by the Crown Prosecution Service other than in exceptional cases i.e. where the attorney general's consent is required by statute or in cases relating to national security. An example of a consent case is the Campbell Case, which led to the fall of the first Labour government in 1924.

The attorney general also superintends the Government Legal Department and the Serious Fraud Office. The attorney general also has powers to bring "unduly lenient" sentences and points of law to the Court of Appeal, issue writs of nolle prosequi to cancel criminal prosecutions, supervise other prosecuting bodies (such as DEFRA) and advise individual ministers facing legal action as a result of their official actions. They are responsible for making applications to the court restraining vexatious litigants, and may intervene in litigation to represent the interests of charity, or the public interest in certain family law cases. They are also officially the leader of the Bar of England and Wales, although this is merely custom and has no duties or rights attached to it. The attorney general's duties have long been considered strenuous, with Sir Patrick Hastings saying that "to be a law officer is to be in hell". Since the passing of the Law Officers Act 1997, any duties of the attorney general can be delegated to the Solicitor General for England and Wales, with their actions pertaining to the attorney general's supposed duties treated as coming from the attorney general himself.

== List of attorneys general ==
=== 13th century ===
- William of Boneville (1277–1278)
- William de Giselham (1278–1279)
- Gilbert de Thornton (1279–1280)
- Alanus of Walkingham (1280–1281)
- John le Fawconer (1281–1284)
- William of Selby (1284–1286)
- Gilbert de Thornton (1286–1286)
- William Inge (1286–1289)
- John de Bosco (1289–1290), also called John de Boys
- William Inge and Hugo de Louther (1291–1293)
- John de Mutford (1293–1299)
- Nicholas de Warwick (1299)

=== 14th century ===
- John de Cestria (1300–1301)
- John de Mutford (1301–1308)
- Matthew de Scacarrio (1308–1312)
- John de Norton (1312–1315)
- William de Langley (1315–1318)
- Adam de Fyneham (1318–1320)
- Galfridus de Scrope (1320–1322)
- Galfridus de Fyngale (1322–1324)
- Adam de Fyneham (1324–1327)
- William of Merston (26 February 1327 – 1327)
- Alexander de Hadenham and Adam de Fyneham (1327–1328)
- Richard of Aldeburgh (1329–1334)
- Simon of Trewythosa (c. 1334)
- William of Hepton (1334–1338)
- John of Lincoln (28 May 1338 – 4 August 1338)
- John of Clone (4 August 1338 – 1338)
- William of Merington (1338–1339)
- John of Clone (1339–1342)
- William of Thorpe (1342–1343)
- John of Lincoln (1343–1343)
- John of Clone (1343–1349)
- Simon of Kegworth (1349–1353)
- Henry of Greystok (1353–1356)
- John of Gaunt (1356 – 4 May 1360)
- Richard of Fryseby (4 May 1360 – 1362)
- William (or possibly Robert) of Pleste (1362–1363)
- William of Nessefield (1363 – 9 November 1366)
- Thomas of Shardelow (9 November 1366 – 20 May 1367)
- John of Ashwell (20 May 1367 – 1367)
- Michael Skilling (1367–1378)
- Thomas of Shardelow (1378–1381)
- William Ellis (1381–1381)
- Laurence Dru (1381–1384)
- William of Horneby (1384–1386)
- Edmund Brudnell (1386–1398)
- Thomas Coveley (1398 – 30 September 1399)
- William of Lodington (30 September 1399 – 1401)

=== 15th century ===
- Thomas Coveley (1401 – 13 July 1407)
- Thomas Dereham (13 July 1407 – 17 August 1407)
- Roger Hunt (17 August 1407 – 1410)
- Thomas Tickhill (1410 – 16 January 1414)
- William Babington (16 January 1414 – 1420)
- William Babthorpe (1420 – 28 October 1429)
- John Vampage (28 October 1429 – 30 June 1452)
- William of Nottingham (30 June 1452 – 12 August 1461)
- John Herbert (12 August 1461 – 1461)
- Henry Sothill (1461 – 16 June 1471)
- William Hussey (16 June 1471 – 7 May 1481)
- William Huddesfield (7 May 1481 – 28 May 1483)
- Morgan Kidwelly (28 May 1483 – 20 September 1485)
- William Hody (20 September 1485 – 3 November 1486)
- James Hobart (3 November 1486 – April 1509)

=== 16th century ===
- John Ernley (April 1509 – 26 January 1518)
- John Fitz-James (26 January 1518 – February 1522)
- John Roper (February 1522 – 1 April 1524)
- Ralph Swillington (1 April 1524 – August 1525)
- Richard Lyster (August 1525 – 3 June 1529)
- Christopher Hales (3 June 1529 – 10 July 1535)
- Sir John Baker (10 July 1535 – 8 November 1540)
- William Whorwood (8 November 1540 – 8 June 1545)
- Henry Bradshaw (8 June 1545 – 21 May 1552)
- Edward Griffin (21 May 1552 – 22 January 1559)
- Gilbert Gerard (22 January 1559 – 1 June 1581)
- John Popham (1 June 1581 – 2 June 1592)
- Thomas Egerton (2 June 1592 – 10 April 1594)
- Edward Coke (10 April 1594 – 4 July 1606)

=== 17th century ===
- Henry Hobart (4 July 1606 – 27 October 1613)
- Francis Bacon (27 October 1613 – 12 March 1617)
- Henry Yelverton (12 March 1617 – 11 January 1621)
- Thomas Coventry (11 January 1621 – 31 October 1625)
- Sir Robert Heath (31 October 1625 – 27 October 1631)
- William Noy (27 October 1631 – 27 September 1634)
- John Bankes (27 September 1634 – 29 January 1641)
- Edward Herbert (29 January 1641 – 3 November 1645)
- Thomas Gardiner (royalist) (3 November 1645 – 1649)
- Oliver St John (parliamentary) (May 1644 – 10 January 1649)
- William Steele (commonwealth) (10 January 1649 – 9 April 1649)
- Edmund Prideaux (commonwealth) (9 April 1649 – 1659)
- Robert Reynolds (commonwealth) (1659 – 31 May 1660)
- Edward Herbert (in exile) (1649–1653)
- Geoffrey Palmer (31 May 1660 – 10 May 1670)
- Heneage Finch (10 May 1670 – 12 November 1673)
- Francis North (12 November 1673 – 25 January 1675)
- William Jones (25 January 1675 – 27 October 1679)
- Creswell Levinz (27 October 1679 – 24 February 1681)
- Robert Sawyer (24 February 1681 – 13 December 1687)
- Thomas Powys (13 December 1687 – December 1688)
- Henry Pollexfen (March 1689 – 4 May 1689)
- George Treby (4 May 1689 – 3 May 1692)
- John Somers (3 May 1692 – 30 March 1693)
- Edward Ward (30 March 1693 – 8 June 1695)
- Thomas Trevor (8 June 1695 – 28 June 1701)

=== 18th century ===
- Edward Northey (28 June 1701 – 26 April 1707)
- Simon Harcourt (26 April 1707 – 22 October 1708)
- James Montagu (22 October 1708 – 19 September 1710)
- Simon Harcourt (19 September 1710 – 19 October 1710)
- Edward Northey (19 October 1710 – 18 March 1718)
- Nicholas Lechmere (18 March 1718 – 7 May 1720)
- Robert Raymond (7 May 1720 – 1 February 1724)
- Philip Yorke (1 February 1724 – January 1734)
- John Willes (January 1734 – 28 January 1737)
- Dudley Ryder (28 January 1737 – May 1754)
- William Murray (May 1754 – 3 November 1756)
- Robert Henley (3 November 1756 – 1 July 1757)
- Charles Pratt (1 July 1757 – 25 January 1762)
- Charles Yorke (25 January 1762 – 16 December 1763)
- Fletcher Norton (16 December 1763 – 17 September 1765)
- Charles Yorke (17 September 1765 – 6 August 1766)
- William de Grey (6 August 1766 – 26 January 1771)
- Edward Thurlow (26 January 1771 – 11 June 1778)
- Alexander Wedderburn (11 June 1778 – 21 July 1780)
- James Wallace (21 July 1780 – 18 April 1782)
- Lloyd Kenyon (18 April 1782 – 2 May 1783)
- James Wallace (2 May 1783 – November 1783) (died in office)
- John Lee (22 November 1783 – 19 December 1783)
- Lloyd Kenyon (26 December 1783 – 31 March 1784)
- Richard Arden (31 March 1784 – 28 June 1788)
- Archibald Macdonald (28 June 1788 – 14 February 1793)
- John Scott (14 February 1793 – 18 July 1799)
- John Mitford (18 July 1799 – 14 February 1801)

=== 19th century ===
Colour key (for political parties):
Conservative Liberal

- Edward Law (14 February 1801 – 15 April 1802)
- Spencer Perceval (15 April 1802 – 12 February 1806)
- Arthur Piggott (12 February 1806 – 1 April 1807)
- Vicary Gibbs (1 April 1807 – 26 June 1812)
- Thomas Plumer (26 June 1812 – 4 May 1813)
- William Garrow (4 May 1813 – 7 May 1817)
- Samuel Shepherd (7 May 1817 – 24 July 1819)
- Robert Gifford (24 July 1819 – 9 January 1824)
- John Singleton Copley (9 January 1824 – 20 September 1826)
- Charles Wetherell (20 September 1826 – 27 April 1827)
- James Scarlett (27 April 1827 – 19 February 1828)
- Charles Wetherell (19 February 1828 – 29 June 1829)
- James Scarlett (29 June 1829 – 19 November 1830)
- Thomas Denman (24 November 1830 – 26 November 1832)
- William Horne (26 November 1832 – 1 March 1834)
- John Campbell (1 March 1834 – 14 November 1834)
- Frederick Pollock (17 December 1834 – 8 April 1835)
- John Campbell (30 April 1835 – 3 July 1841)
- Thomas Wilde (3 July 1841 – 30 August 1841)
- Frederick Pollock (6 September 1841 – 15 April 1844)
- William Webb Follett (15 April 1844 – 29 June 1845)
- Frederic Thesiger (29 June 1845 – 27 June 1846)
- Thomas Wilde (7 July 1846 – 17 July 1846)
- John Jervis (17 July 1846 – 11 July 1850)
- John Romilly (11 July 1850 – 28 March 1851)
- Alexander Cockburn (28 March 1851 – 21 February 1852)
- Frederic Thesiger (27 February 1852 – 17 December 1852)
- Alexander Cockburn (28 December 1852 – 15 November 1856)
- Richard Bethell (15 November 1856 – 21 February 1858)
- Fitzroy Kelly (21 February 1858 – 11 June 1859)
- Richard Bethell (18 June 1859 – 4 July 1861)

Attorney general	Term of Office		Political party	Prime Minister
William Atherton	4 July 1861	2 October 1863	Liberal	Palmerston (II)
Roundell Palmer	2 October 1863	26 June 1866	Liberal	Palmerston (II)
Roundell Palmer	2 October 1863	26 June 1866	Liberal	Russell (II)
Hugh Cairns	10 July 1866	29 October 1866	Conservative	Derby-Disraeli (III)
John Rolt	29 October 1866	18 July 1867	Conservative	Derby-Disraeli (III)
John Burgess Karslake	18 July 1867	1 December 1868	Conservative	Derby-Disraeli (III)
Robert Collier	12 December 1868	10 November 1871	Liberal	Gladstone (I)
John Coleridge	10 November 1871	20 November 1873	Liberal	Gladstone (I)
Henry James	20 November 1873	17 February 1874	Liberal	Gladstone (I)
John Burgess Karslake	27 February 1874	20 April 1874	Conservative	Disraeli (II)
Richard Baggallay	20 April 1874	25 November 1875	Conservative	Disraeli (II)
John Holker	25 November 1875	21 April 1880	Conservative	Disraeli (II)
Henry James	3 May 1880	9 June 1885	Liberal	Gladstone (II)
Sir Richard Webster	27 June 1885	28 January 1886	Conservative	Marquess of Salisbury (I)
Sir Charles Russell	9 February 1886	20 July 1886	Liberal	Gladstone (III)
Sir Richard Webster	5 August 1886	11 August 1892	Conservative	Marquess of Salisbury (II)
Sir Charles Russell	20 August 1892	3 May 1894	Liberal	Gladstone ( IV)
Sir John Rigby	3 May 1894	24 October 1894	Liberal	Gladstone ( IV)
Sir John Rigby	3 May 1894	24 October 1894	Liberal	5th Earl of Rosebery
Sir Robert Reid	24 October 1894	21 June 1895	Liberal	5th Earl of Rosebery
Sir Richard Webster	8 July 1895	7 May 1900	Conservative	Marquess of Salisbury ( Unionist Coalition)

=== 20th century ===
Colour key (for political parties):

Conservative
Labour
Liberal
Liberal Unionist
National Labour
Irish Unionist

Attorney general	Term of office		Political party	Prime Minister
Sir Robert Finlay	7 May 1900	4 December 1905	Liberal Unionist	Marquess of Salisbury ( Unionist Coalition)
Sir Robert Finlay	7 May 1900	4 December 1905	Liberal Unionist	Balfour ( Unionist Coalition)
Sir John Lawson Walton	12 December 1905	28 January 1908	Liberal	Campbell-Bannerman
Sir William Robson	28 January 1908	7 October 1910	Liberal	Campbell-Bannerman
Sir William Robson	28 January 1908	7 October 1910	Liberal	Asquith ( I)
Sir Rufus Isaacs	7 October 1910	19 October 1913	Liberal	Asquith ( I)
Sir John Simon	19 October 1913	25 May 1915	Liberal	Asquith ( I)
Sir Edward Carson	25 May 1915	19 October 1915	Irish Unionist	Asquith (Coalition)
Sir Frederick E. Smith	3 November 1915	10 January 1919	Conservative	Asquith (Coalition)
Sir Frederick E. Smith	3 November 1915	10 January 1919	Conservative	Lloyd George (Coalition)
Sir Gordon Hewart	10 January 1919	6 March 1922	Liberal	Lloyd George (Coalition)
Sir Ernest Pollock	6 March 1922	19 October 1922	Conservative	Lloyd George (Coalition)
Sir Douglas Hogg	24 October 1922	22 January 1924	Conservative	Law
Sir Douglas Hogg	24 October 1922	22 January 1924	Conservative	Baldwin
Sir Patrick Hastings	23 January 1924	3 November 1924	Labour	MacDonald
Sir Douglas Hogg	6 November 1924	28 March 1928	Conservative	Baldwin
Sir Thomas Inskip	28 March 1928	4 June 1929	Conservative	Baldwin
Sir William Jowitt	7 June 1929	26 January 1932	Labour	MacDonald (II)
Sir William Jowitt	7 June 1929	26 January 1932	Labour	MacDonald (First National ministry)
Sir William Jowitt	7 June 1929	26 January 1932	Labour	MacDonald (Second National ministry)
Sir Thomas Inskip	26 January 1932	18 March 1936	Conservative	MacDonald (Second National ministry)
Sir Thomas Inskip	26 January 1932	18 March 1936	Conservative	Baldwin (Third National ministry)
Sir Donald Somervell	18 March 1936	25 May 1945	Conservative	Baldwin (Third National ministry)
Sir Donald Somervell	18 March 1936	25 May 1945	Conservative	Chamberlain (Fourth National ministry)
Sir Donald Somervell	18 March 1936	25 May 1945	Conservative	Chamberlain (War)
Sir Donald Somervell	18 March 1936	25 May 1945	Conservative	Churchill (War)
Sir David Maxwell Fyfe; MP for Liverpool West Derby	25 May 1945	26 July 1945	Conservative	Churchill (Caretaker)
Sir Hartley Shawcross; MP for St Helens	4 August 1945	24 April 1951	Labour	Attlee
Sir Frank Soskice; MP for Sheffield Neepsend	24 April 1951	26 October 1951	Labour	Attlee
Sir Lionel Heald; MP for Chertsey	3 November 1951	18 October 1954	Conservative	Churchill
Sir Reginald; Manningham-Buller; MP for Northamptonshire South	18 October 1954	16 July 1962	Conservative	Churchill
Sir Reginald; Manningham-Buller; MP for Northamptonshire South	18 October 1954	16 July 1962	Conservative	Eden
Sir Reginald; Manningham-Buller; MP for Northamptonshire South	18 October 1954	16 July 1962	Conservative	Macmillan
Sir John Hobson; MP for Warwick and Leamington	16 July 1962	16 October 1964	Conservative	Macmillan
Sir John Hobson; MP for Warwick and Leamington	16 July 1962	16 October 1964	Conservative	Douglas-Home
Sir Elwyn Jones; MP for West Ham South	18 October 1964	19 June 1970	Labour	Wilson
Sir Peter Rawlinson; MP for Epsom	23 June 1970	4 March 1974	Conservative	Heath
Sam Silkin; MP for Dulwich	7 March 1974	4 May 1979	Labour	Wilson
Sam Silkin; MP for Dulwich	7 March 1974	4 May 1979	Labour	Callaghan
Sir Michael Havers; MP for Wimbledon	6 May 1979	13 June 1987	Conservative	Thatcher
Sir Patrick Mayhew; MP for Tunbridge Wells	13 June 1987	10 April 1992	Conservative	Thatcher
Sir Patrick Mayhew; MP for Tunbridge Wells	13 June 1987	10 April 1992	Conservative	Major
Sir Nicholas Lyell; MP for Mid Bedfordshire	10 April 1992	2 May 1997	Conservative	Major
John Morris; MP for Aberavon	6 May 1997	29 July 1999	Labour	Blair
The Lord Williams of Mostyn	29 July 1999	11 June 2001	Labour	Blair

=== 21st century ===
Colour key (for political parties):

Conservative
Labour

Attorney general	Term of office		Political party	Prime Minister
Peter Goldsmith, Baron Goldsmith	11 June 2001	27 June 2007	Labour	Blair
Patricia Scotland, Baroness Scotland of Asthal	27 June 2007	11 May 2010	Labour	Brown
Dominic Grieve; MP for Beaconsfield	12 May 2010	15 July 2014	Conservative	Cameron (coalition)
Jeremy Wright; MP for Kenilworth and Southam	15 July 2014	9 July 2018	Conservative	Cameron
Jeremy Wright; MP for Kenilworth and Southam	15 July 2014	9 July 2018	Conservative	May
Geoffrey Cox; MP for Torridge and West Devon	9 July 2018	13 February 2020	Conservative	May
Geoffrey Cox; MP for Torridge and West Devon	9 July 2018	13 February 2020	Conservative	Johnson
Suella Braverman; MP for Fareham	13 February 2020	2 March 2021	Conservative	Johnson
Michael Ellis; MP for Northampton North	2 March 2021 (Note: Served as Acting Attorney General while Suella Braverman was on Maternity Leave.)	10 September 2021	Conservative	Johnson
Suella Braverman; MP for Fareham	10 September 2021	6 September 2022	Conservative	Johnson
Michael Ellis; MP for Northampton North	6 September 2022	25 October 2022	Conservative	Truss
Victoria Prentis; MP for Banbury	25 October 2022	5 July 2024	Conservative	Sunak
Richard Hermer, Baron Hermer	5 July 2024	20 July 2026	Labour	Starmer
Ellie Reeves; MP for Lewisham West and East Dulwich	20 July 2026	Incumbent	Labour	Burnham

== See also ==
- Solicitor General for England and Wales
- Attorney General for Northern Ireland (held by Attorney General for England and Wales from 1970 to 2010)
- Advocate General for Scotland
- Attorney-General for Ireland

== Works cited ==
- Attorney General's Office (2007). The governance of Britain: a consultation on the role of the Attorney General. The Stationery Office. ISBN 9780101719223.
- Carroll, Alex (2007). Constitutional and Administrative Law (4th ed.). Pearson Longman. ISBN 978-1-4058-1231-3.
- Cooley, Rita (1958). "Predecessors of the Federal Attorney General: The Attorney General in England and the American Colonies". The American Journal of Legal History. 2 (4). Temple University: 304–312. doi:10.2307/844539. ISSN 0002-9319. JSTOR 844539.
- Dickens, Bernard (1972). "The Attorney-General's Consent to Prosecutions". The Modern Law Review. 35 (4). Blackwell Publishing: 347–361. doi:10.1111/j.1468-2230.1972.tb02353.x.
- Elliott, Catherine; Francis Quinn (2008). English Legal System (9th ed.). Pearson Longman. ISBN 978-1-4058-5941-7.
- Jones, Elwyn (1969). "The Office of Attorney-General". The Cambridge Law Journal. 27 (1). Cambridge University Press: 43–53. doi:10.1017/S0008197300088899. ISSN 0008-1973. S2CID 145400357.
