= Newbo Abbey =

Coordinates: 52°55′53.74″N 0°43′8.51″W

Newbo Abbey was a Premonstratensian house of canons regular in Lincolnshire, England, and was dedicated to the Assumption of Mary.

== Pogrom ==
Newbo was founded in about 1198 very close to Sedgebrook by Richard de Malebisse or Malbis (died 1209). Malbis, as one of the judges itinerant of York and heavily in debt to a Jewish banker, had instigated in 1190 a pogrom against the Jews of the city, which may have cost as many as 500 lives. (See the History section of York Castle and the page of Yom Tov of Joigny, an eminent rabbi who was among the victims.)

== Decline ==
"In 1401, the monastery was almost depopulated by the results of pestilence and poverty. A licence had to be granted to the abbot in this year to admit twelve canons regular of the order, priests or in minor orders, who should be willing to transfer themselves to Newbo for their lifetime, or until more novices should come to the house. There was evidently some difficulty in finding enough to fill up the vacant places; for about the same time a further licence was granted to the abbot to dispense twelve secular persons from any kind of defect of birth, and to promote them to holy orders; they might hold benefices or any ecclesiastical dignities. The indulgence of the Portiuncula was granted at the same time to penitents visiting the conventual church and contributing to its repair. No doubt some time passed before the abbey recovered its numbers and prosperity; but by the end of the century all seems to have been fairly well."

== Suppression ==
Newbo was suppressed at Michaelmas 1536 during the Dissolution of the Monasteries by Henry VIII. He gave a lease to the courtier Margery Lyster.

Stone coffins were dug up in the area of the abbey in about 1920 by the then Duke of Rutland and are in Belvoir Castle ,(one being of an abbot), which is only about four miles from the site.

== Abbots of Newbo ==
- Ralf, occurs 1227
- Matthew, occurs 1242
- William, elected 1276, occurs 1310
- Ralf, occurs 1401
- Simon of Mumby, elected 1406
- John, elected 1412
- William Gresley, occurs 1433
- William Bottesford, elected 1436
- Peter York, occurs 1475 to 1478
- John Mownckton, occurs 1482 to 1491
- John Colby, occurs 1494 to 1500
- William Broil, occurs 1522
- Richard Carre, last abbot, occurs 1529
