= St Mary's Church, Micheldever =

Church of St Mary
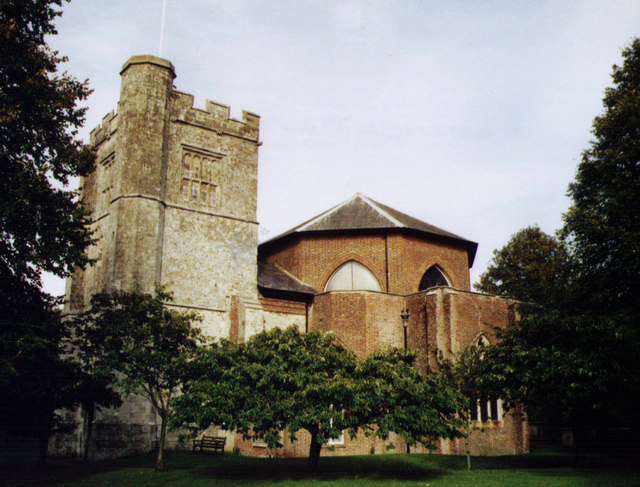
- Church of St Mary
- 51°8′56.8″N 1°16′6.1″W
- OS grid reference: SU 513 391
- Location: Micheldever, Hampshire
- Country: England
- Denomination: Church of England
- Website: stmarysmicheldever.co.uk

History
- Dedication: Saint Mary the Virgin

Architecture
- Heritage designation: Grade II*
- Designated: 5 December 1955

Administration
- Diocese: Diocese of Winchester

St Mary's Church is an Anglican church in Micheldever, Hampshire, England. It is in the Diocese of Winchester. The building, which is Grade II* listed, is unusual for its octagonal nave.

== Description ==
The oldest parts of the church, the west bay of the nave next to the tower, date from the 13th century. The tower was built in the mid 16th century.

=== Nave ===
The brick-built octagonal nave, designed by George Dance the Younger, was built in 1808; it was commissioned by Francis Baring, 1st Baronet, who acquired the manor of Micheldever in 1801. It was based on Dance's design for the Church of St Bartholomew the Less in London. Nicholas Pevsner, in his Architectural Guide for Winchester and North Hampshire, described the exterior of the church as "arresting, a shockingly odd and nakedly unadorned composition of three separate parts, not a little strange in its rural setting".

=== Chancel ===
The chancel and pointed chancel arch date from the 1880s. There are monuments to members of the Baring family in the chancel; the monument to Harriet Baring (died 1804), wife of Sir Francis, was created by John Flaxman and erected in 1806.

=== Memorials ===
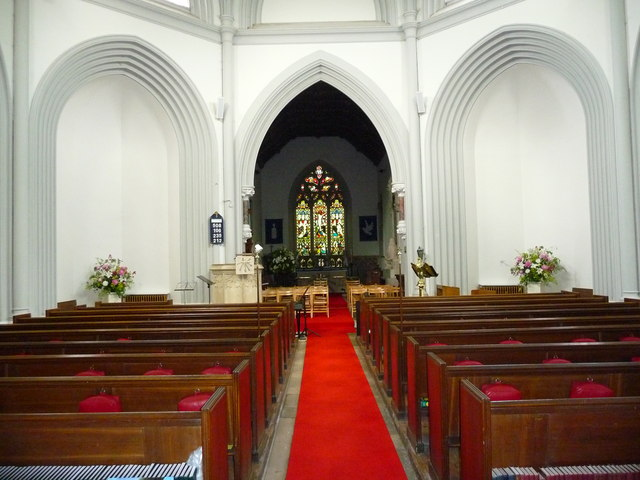
The nave

There is a plaque commemorating Henri de Massue, Earl of Galway (1648–1720) on the south wall of the tower. He died nearby in East Stratton and was buried in the churchyard, but it is not known where. There is a plaque in memory of Vice Admiral Sir Norman Denning (1904–1979) on the south wall; he was a churchwarden here and is buried in the churchyard.

=== Bells ===
There are six bells in the tower. Five date from 1703; in 1903 three of these were recast, and a sixth bell was added.
