= Margery Lyster =

English courtier (died 1565)

Margery Lyster or Lister, nee Horsman (died 1565) was an English courtier. She is known as a member of the households of three queens of England; Catherine of Aragon, Anne Boleyn and Jane Seymour.

== Career ==
She became a Maid of Honour at court, and is recorded in the service of three queens consort of Henry VIII of England. Her dates of birth and death are uncertain, the burial of a "Margareta Lyster" at St Martin-in-the-Fields was recorded in July 1565.

Her family background is unclear, but in November 1534 she wrote a letter to Thomas Cromwell describing Martin Hastings of Binham and Elsing (died 1574) as her cousin. He was a member of the household of Henry FitzRoy, Duke of Richmond and Somerset, and builder of Hindringham Hall.

=== Service of Anne Boleyn ===
Margery Lyster was a maid of honour to Catherine of Aragon, but is most documented during the tenure of Anne Boleyn.

Margery was involved in the business of placing 15-year-old Anne Bassett, a daughter of Lady Lisle, at court. She is the source of information about Anne Boleyn's dog Purkoy. The name is pourquoi, French for Why?

Thomas Broke wrote to Lady Lisle on 18 December 1534 that "Mistress Margery Horsman" had told him how much Anne had delighted in "little Purkoy", presumably one of her many gifts to Anne. Sadly, Purkoy had died from a fall, and for a time, according to Margery, there "durst nobody tell her Grace of it, till it pleaseth the Kings Highness to tell her Grace of it". Broke's letter does not say when or where Purkoy died, he was writing to encourage Lady Lisle to send Anne another dog.

Lady Lisle sent Margery a jewellery box in March 1536. Most of the letters mentioning Margery are part of the Lisle Papers, an important source for life at the Tudor court.

=== Service of Jane Seymour ===
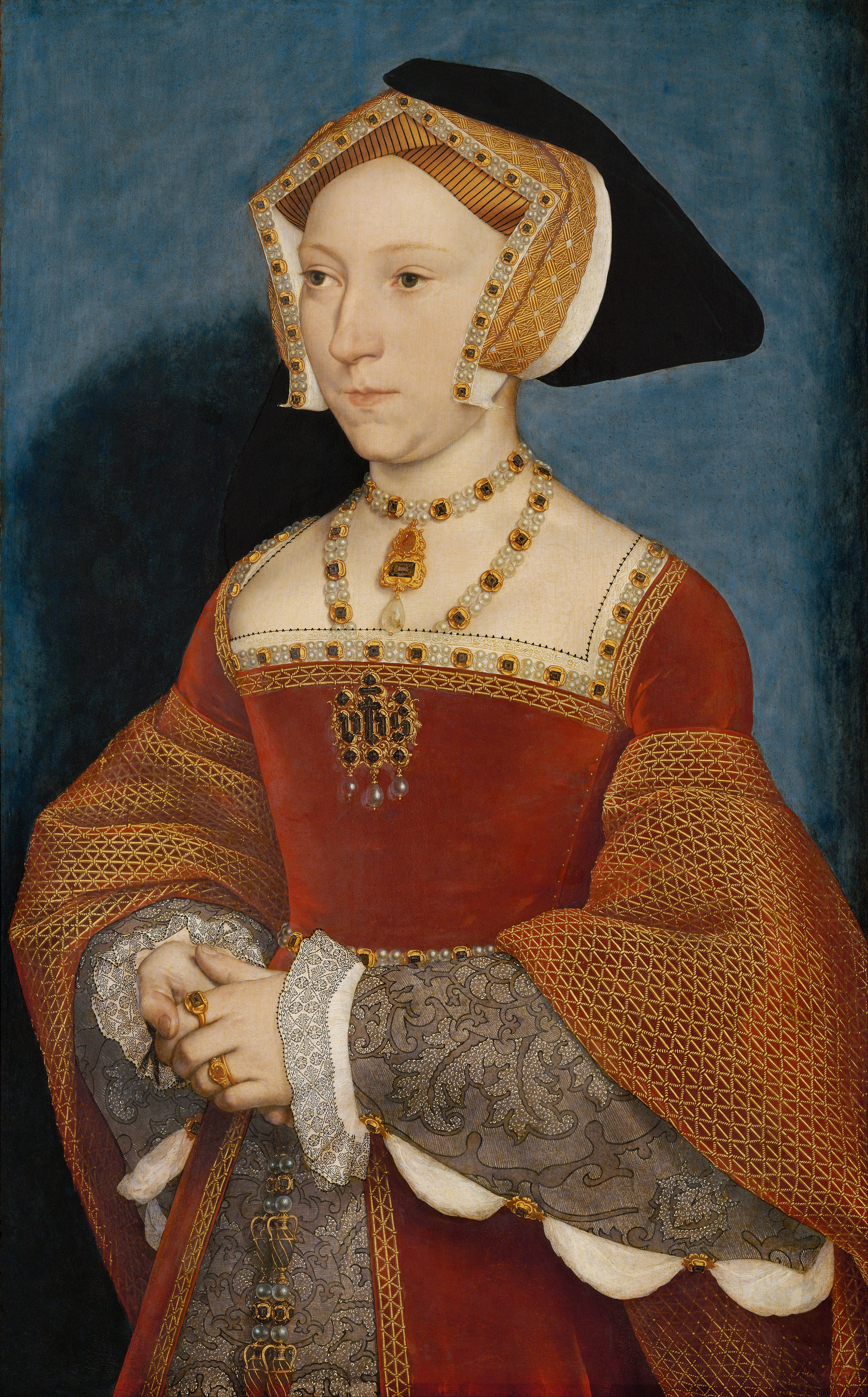
Margery Lyster was keeper of Jane Seymour's jewels

In 1537, Margery Horsham married Sir Michael Lyster and became known as Mistress or Lady Lyster. On February that same year, she and another Mistress Margery were asked by John Husee to find a place for Katherine Basset as a chamberer or lady in waiting to the newly married Countess of Sussex. Lyster explained that the three places in the countess' household were filled, but offered to take Katherine as her own companion or place her with young Mrs Norris.

Lyster would bring Katherine to the queen's chamber every day, the result desired by her mother Lady Lisle. Lyster advised that if Katherine came to court, she would need silk gowns and kirtles and good attirements for her head and neck,

By October 1537, Lady Lyster was in charge of the jewels of Jane Seymour. An inventory was made of the queen's beads, jewels, pomanders, tablets, girdles, borders, brooches, bracelets, buttons, aglets, and chains, in the care of Mistress Lyster. Many of the items described were gold decorated with enamel and few pieces were set with gems. Lady Lyster received several jewels as gifts.

As a "gentlewoman of the privy chamber to the late Queen Jane", on 29 November 1537, she was given a discharge or receipt for the late queen's jewels. Michael Lyster was a groom of the King's privy chamber at the reception of Anne of Cleves in 1539.

== Marriage and family ==
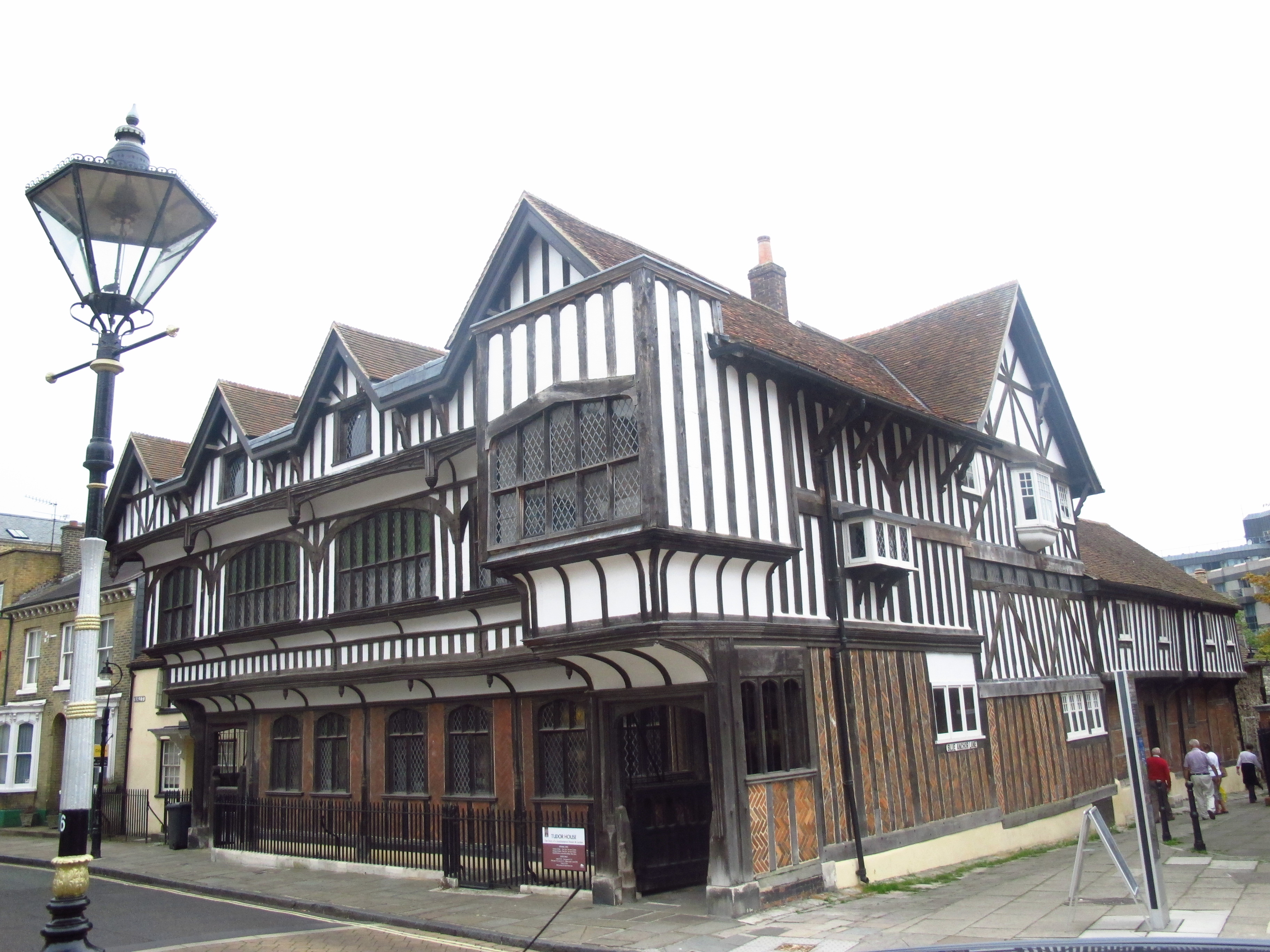
The Lyster house in Southampton, known as The Tudor House

She married Michael Lyster (died 1551) of Hurstbourne Priors, a son of Richard Lyster, in 1537. Richard Lyster had a house in Southampton, and was buried nearby at St Michael's Church, where there is a monument. Henry VIII gave Margery Lyster a lease of Newbo Abbey in Lincolnshire as an income.

Her children included:

- Lawrence Lyster
- Charles Lyster (1534-1613).

Michael Lyster had a son, Richard Lyster (1532-1558), from his first marriage to Elizabeth Delabere. Richard Lyster junior married Mary Wriothesley, a daughter of Thomas Wriothesley, 1st Earl of Southampton.

A note in an inventory of jewels of Mary I of England mentions that she gave a "heart" from a rosary of lapis lazuli beads to the "Lady Lyster's daughter".
