= Roger Cholmeley =

English judge; founder of Highgate School

Sir Roger Cholmeley (/ˈtʃʌmli/ CHUM-lee; sometimes spelled Cholmley or Cholmondeley; c. 1485 – 21 June 1565) was Lord Chief Justice of the Court of King's Bench from 1552 to 1553. From 1535 to 1545 he was Recorder of London and served in the House of Commons. He is possibly best remembered for his endowment to found a free grammar school, Highgate School, at London.

== Background and early life ==
Cholmeley was the illegitimate son of Sir Richard Cholmeley of Yorkshire (c. 1460 – 1521), who served as Lieutenant of the Tower of London from 1513 to 1520. Cholmeley's family can be traced back to the 12th-century Robert de Chelmundelegh, second son of William le Belward, who inherited parts of the Barony of Malpas (for which Malpas, Cheshire, is named), including Cholmondeley, Cheshire, previously held by Robert Fitzhugh. Over the centuries, the family name was spelt in many variants as Middle English developed away from French influences. Different branches of the family still spell the name differently, and Cholmeley's most famous cousins, of Cholmondeley, Cheshire, spell it "Cholmondeley". The pronunciation and spelling are neither counterintuitive nor phonetic, but as used down the ages.

Roger Cholmeley was educated to the law at Lincoln's Inn from 1506. Despite thrice being expelled from the Inn, he entered the legal profession.

== Career ==
Most of Cholmeley's career as a lawyer was spent in the City of London, but he lived at Highgate in Middlesex. In 1520 he was called as a bencher of Lincoln's Inn, in 1531 became a serjeant-at-law, and in November 1534 was knighted. From 1535 to 1545 he was Recorder of London, during which time he was one of the city's Members of Parliament in four Parliaments.

In November 1545 Cholmeley became Chief Baron of the Exchequer, and in May 1552 was appointed Chief Justice of the King's Bench. He was Lord Chief Justice for only a year as Queen Mary I would not reappoint him. The same year, he was imprisoned for a month and fined for signing Lady Jane Grey's instrument of succession as Queen. He returned to work as a barrister and was a Member of Parliament for Middlesex from 1554 to 1559.

Princess (later Queen) Elizabeth I stayed the night of 15 Feb 1555 at Cholmeley's residence in Highgate.

== Highgate School ==
Cholmeley founded Highgate School, which was established by royal charter in 1565. Former pupils of the school are known as Old Cholmeleians in his memory. The school has gone on to become a leading independent school (sometimes referred to as a public school). Old Cholmeleians include John Venn, the creator of Venn diagrams, poets Gerard Manley Hopkins and John Betjeman, and musicians John Tavener and John Rutter.

== Death ==
Cholmeley died in London on 21 June 1565. He was buried at St Martin, Ludgate.

He willed property to nephew Jasper.

== Family ==
He married Christine Hurst, who died in 1558. They had two daughters:

- Elizabeth, married first to Sir Leonard Beckwith of Selby, Yorkshire, and secondly (1559) to Christopher Kern of Kern, Somersetshire;
- Frances, the other daughter, was married to Sir Thomas Russell of Strensham, Worcestershire.

Legal offices
Preceded by Richard Lyster	Lord Chief Justice; 1552–1553	Succeeded by Thomas Bromley
Preceded by Sir Richard Lyster	Lord Chief Baron of the Exchequer; 1545–1552	Succeeded by Henry Bradshaw
