= Christopher Hales =

English judge and Master of the Rolls

Sir Christopher Hales
- Died: 1541
- Spouse: Elizabeth Caunton
- Children: John Hales; Elizabeth Hales; Margaret Hales; Mary Hales
- Parent(s): Thomas Hales; Alicia Eveas

Sir Christopher Hales (died 1541) was an English judge and Master of the Rolls.

== Family ==
The family of Hales was a most ancient one, deriving its name from Hales in Norfolk, where the ancestor of the father of Roger de Hales (1274–1313), Ralph de Hales, also named Roger de Hales possessed property in the reign of Henry II. Before the close of Edward III's reign, it had removed into Kent and was settled at Halden near Tenterden. The unfortunate Robert de Hales was of this family.

Christopher Hales was the son of Thomas Hales. His mother was Alicia, one of the four daughters and co-heirs of Humphrey Eveas. Receiving his legal education at Gray's Inn, he rose to be an ancient in 1516, and Autumn Reader in 1524.

== Career ==
On 14 August 1525, he succeeded Richard Lyster as solicitor-general, and became attorney-general on 3 June 1529. During his seven years in this office, he conducted the proceedings against several illustrious persons who had incurred the king's displeasure. He prosecuted Thomas Wolsey by an indictment to which the cardinal made no defence; he appeared for the king against Sir Thomas More and John Fisher on their last arraignment; and the trials of Queen Anne Boleyn and those charged with being implicated with her occurred during the last few months of his official tenure.

On the elevation of Thomas Cromwell to the office of Lord Privy Seal, Hales succeeded him as Master of the Rolls on 10 July 1536, and retained the place for the five remaining years of his life, having received the honour of knighthood soon after his appointment.

In 1540 he was associated with Thomas Cranmer, Lord Chancellor Rich, and other commissioners in the work of remodelling the foundation of Canterbury Cathedral, ousting the monks and supplying their place with secular clergy. He profited largely by the dissolution of the monasteries, obtaining many grants of land which had belonged to them in Kent.

Hales died in June 1541, and was buried at Hackington or St. Stephen's, near Canterbury. Hales' only son, John, died in 1546, and Hales' daughters became his coheirs.

== Marriage and issue ==
Hales married Elizabeth Caunton, the daughter of John Caunton, an alderman of London, by whom he had a son, John, who died at the age of fourteen in 1546, and three daughters:

- Elizabeth Hales, who married first John Stocker and then Sir George Sydenham. Their daughter Elizabeth, born about 1562, became the second wife of Sir Francis Drake.
- Margaret Hales, who married firstly Lewis West, secondly Ralph Dodmore, and thirdly William Horden of Kent.
- Mary Hales, who married firstly Alexander Culpeper and secondly in 1554 Thomas Arundell.
