= John Writhe =

English officer of arms

John Writhe (died 1504) was a long-serving English officer of arms. He was probably the son of William Writhe, who represented the borough of Cricklade in the Parliament of 1450–51, and is most remembered for being the first Garter King of Arms to preside over the College of Arms. Writhe is also notable for the contention that it was he who developed the system of heraldic cadency employed by English officers of arms to the present day.

== Heraldic career ==
It has been claimed that Writhe began his career as Antelope Pursuivant or Rouge Croix Pursuivant under Henry V, but this is doubtful. By February 1474 he had been appointed Falcon Herald. On 25 January 1477 Edward IV made him Norroy King of Arms and on 6 July 1478, he was promoted to Garter Principal King of Arms. Writhe officiated at Edward's funeral in April 1483 and at Richard III coronation the following July. As Garter he also took part in the coronation of Henry VII who reappointed him on 13 February 1486 with back pay to the date of Bosworth.

Writhe was the first Garter of the College of Arms, which had been incorporated in March 1484. Contrary to popular belief, though, the College did not take its own coat of arms from Writhe; the converse is more likely. As Falcon and Garter he was employed on numerous diplomatic missions to Scotland and the continent, and at least once to Ireland. An experienced armorist, Writhe collected and compiled many important armorial and genealogical manuscripts. In 1498 King Henry VII granted him and Roger Machado, Clarenceux King of Arms, a joint licence to make visitations.

== Personal life ==
Writhe may have lived in Red Cross Street, adjoining Barbican House in London. After Writhe's death, his son Thomas styled him Sir John but there is no proof that he was ever knighted. His first marriage was to Barbara, daughter and heir of John Dunstanville. This union brought about the aforementioned Thomas (who was himself the father of Charles Wriothesley, Windsor Herald); William, York Herald; and two daughters, the elder of whom married John Mynne, another York Herald. Writhe died some time during May 1504 and was buried in St Giles-without-Cripplegate.

== Arms ==
Coat of arms of John Writhe
Crest On a torse or & azure a dove close argent, beak & legs gules, crowned or. Escutcheon Azure, a cross or between 4 doves close argent, beaks & legs gules. Badge A 'bugle' (buffalo) head erased sable goutty, horned, ringed & crowned or (sometimes used as crest). Symbolism Originally the birds were doves, chosen in reference to the fourteenth-century theory that heralds should relinquish their paternal arms and take doves or other bearings alluding to their office. It has been suggested that the College of Arms based their coat on Writhe's but the converse is more likely.

== See also ==
- Herald
- King of Arms

== Notes ==
Heraldic offices
Preceded by Thomas Holme	Norroy King of Arms; 1477–1478	Succeeded by John Moore
Preceded by John Smert	Garter Principal King of Arms; 1478–1504	Succeeded by Sir Thomas Wriothesley

== Sources ==
- John Anstis. The Register of the Most Noble Order of the Garter. (London, 1724).
- Walter H. Godfrey and Sir Anthony Wagner, The College of Arms, Queen Victoria Street: being the sixteenth and final monograph of the London Survey Committee. (London, 1963).
- Mark Noble, A History of the College of Arms. (London, 1805).
- A. F. Sutton and P. W. Hammond. The Coronation of Richard III: The Extant Documents. (New York, 1984).
- Sir Anthony Wagner. Heralds of England: a History of the Office and College of Arms. (London, 1967).
- Sir Anthony Wagner. A Catalogue of English Mediaeval Rolls of Arms. Harleian Society (London, 1950), 100.
- The College of Arms - Explains credit for cadency system.
