= Roger Machado (diplomat) =

English diplomat and officer of arms of Portuguese extraction

Canting arms of Roger Machado: Gules, 5 axes, 2, 1, 2, argent. (Machado means axe in Portuguese.)

Roger Machado (Portuguese: Rogério Machado; died 6 May 1510) was an English diplomat and officer of arms of Portuguese extraction. He lived among the Portuguese merchants at Bruges in 1455.

== Heraldic career ==
The first reference to Machado's heraldic activities is as Leicester Herald on missions to the Low Countries in 1478 and 1480. As Leicester he also participated in Edward IV's funeral in April 1483. Although an inventory of his household goods in 1484 shows that he was living a comfortable married life, his failure to pay debts forced him to flee the country. Thus in 1484—the year of the incorporation of the College of Arms—Machado was importing wine from Spain.

From January 1485 Machado took part in various missions abroad in the service of the Marquess of Dorset. These were most likely missions to help the exiled Henry Tudor. Just before the Battle of Bosworth Field, Henry made him his own personal officer of arms as Richmond Herald. Machado came over to England with Henry and on 21 September, as Richmond Herald, was appointed searcher of customs at Southampton. By the end of October he had been appointed Richmond King of Arms. On Christmas Day he was promoted to Norroy King of Arms even though the present incumbent officer, John Moore, continued in that office until his death in 1491. On 24 January 1494 Machado was appointed Clarenceux King of Arms.

In June 1498, Machado and John Writhe, Garter King of Arms, were granted a joint licence to make visitations. There is no evidence that they or their deputies undertook these journeys. Machado wished to concentrate on his trading activities and diplomatic missions rather than on his heraldic duties. In 1505, the king offered Machado the office of Garter King of Arms, but he declined on the grounds that he was too old and weak. Machado also handed over to Thomas Writhe, the new Garter, many of the duties of Clarenceux. In January 1509 the two formalised an agreement where Machado handing over substantial powers as Clarenceux in return for a payment of £4 a year from Garter Writhe.

== Diplomatic career ==
In spite of his long heraldic career, Machado is best remembered as an accomplished diplomat. He was involved in numerous missions and many were of a highly sensitive nature. He described three of these missions in his journal. The first was to Spain and Portugal in 1488 and 1489 and the other two were both to Brittany in 1490 when he took a much larger part in the negotiations. In August 1494 he was dispatched to the court of Charles VIII of France to discuss Charles's offer of aid to Henry should the emperor Maximilian support Perkin Warbeck's claim to the English throne. In 1495, 1496 and 1497 he again visited Charles. On the last occasion he may have had with him Warbeck's confession since he had been involved in the impostor's recent surrender.

Machado is known to have spoken English, French, Spanish, and Portuguese, and probably he also spoke Italian and Latin. The Milanese ambassador considered him wise, endowed with wit and discretion, a man who saw everything. He was clearly an old friend and faithful servant of Henry VII. In June 1483, Machado was described as late of Southampton and formerly of London. He died on 6 May 1510.
