= Ralph Swillington =

Ralph Swillington (died 1525) was Recorder of Coventry and Attorney General to Henry VIII.

Swillington was Attorney General for the short period of time between 1524 and his death in the following year. In his will (dated 11 July 1525), he left land in Driffield, Yorkshire, to his nephew, George Swillington. A monument in St. Michael's Church, Coventry, commemorates Swillington, his wife Elizabeth (Babthorpe) and her other husband, Thomas Essex.
