= Thomas Wriothesley =

English Officer of Arms

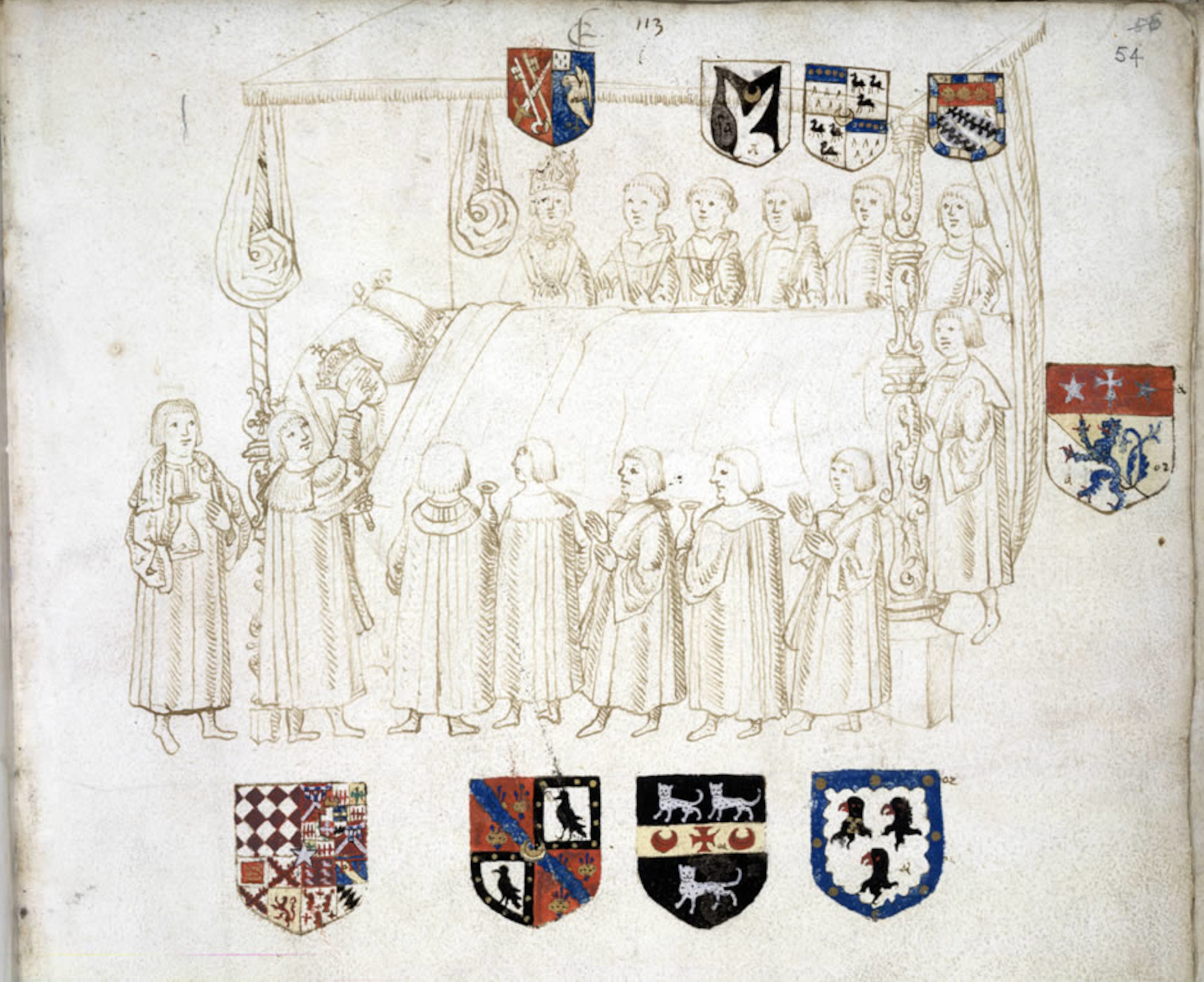
Heraldic drawing by Wriothesley of deathbed of King Henry VII, 1509. Although not present, Wriothesley wrote his account, in which the drawing features, from discussions with attendees. BL Add.MS.45131,f.54

Sir Thomas Wriothesley (/ˈraɪəθsli/ RY-əth-slee; died 24 November 1534) was a long serving officer of arms at the College of Arms in London. He was the son of Garter King of Arms, John Writhe, and he succeeded his father in this office.

As a herald, he was an artist of rather modest talent, but leaving several illuminated images of great interest.

== Personal life ==
Wriothesley was born at Colatford, Wiltshire. His name at birth was Thomas Writhe, and he was the eldest son and second of four children of John Writhe and his first wife, Barbara, daughter of John Castlecombe. The location of Colatford has not been identified, but it was either near Castle Combe or Cricklade.

Wriothesley's first wife, whom he married before 1500, was Jane, daughter of William Hall of Salisbury. The pair had ten children together, though their only surviving son was Charles Wriothesley, Windsor Herald of Arms in Ordinary. His second wife was Anne, widow of Robert Warcop with whom he had a daughter who died in infancy. Wriothesley died "worn out with age" in London, on 24 November 1534, and was presumably buried with his family in St Giles Cripplegate. Mark Noble purports to quote from his will, but it cannot now be found. His library may have stayed intact until the death of his son Charles in 1562; after that, it was probably dispersed. Manuscripts of his are now to be found in the College of Arms, the British Library, and elsewhere.

His nephew Thomas Wriothesley, 1st Earl of Southampton (1505-1550) achieved great success as a courtier and fixer for the crown, rising to be Lord Chancellor.

== Heraldic career ==
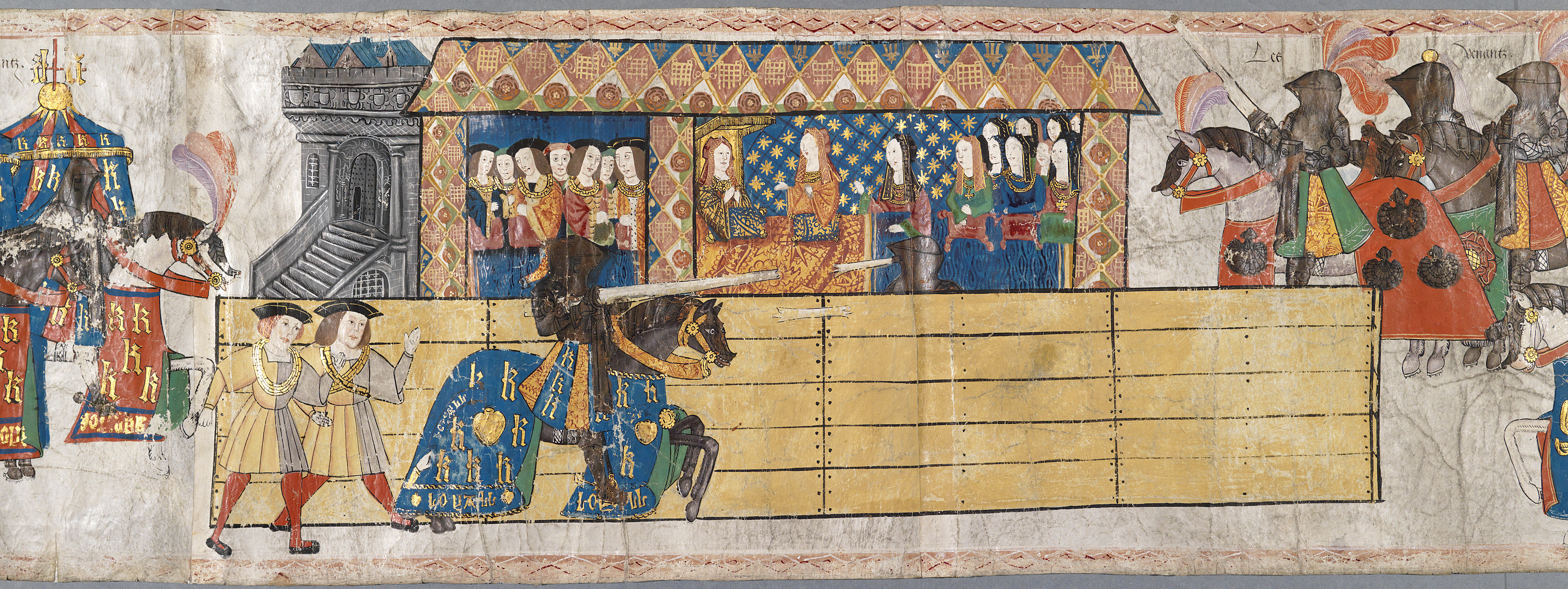
Catherine of Aragon watching Henry VIII jousting in her honour after giving birth to a son, by Wriothesley, 1511. Henry's horse mantle is emblazoned with Catherine's initial letter, 'K'.

In 1489 Wriothesley was made Wallingford Pursuivant in the private service of Prince Arthur at Wallingford and continued as such under Prince Henry. In 1491 he accompanied King Henry VII to Brittany. On 26 January 1505 he was appointed Garter King of Arms, over the heads of all the royal heralds in ordinary. Clarenceux King of Arms, Roger Machado, was an old friend of Wriothesley's father and helped push the appointment through. It was around this time that Thomas changed his original surname of Writhe to the grander one of Wriothesley, which he applied retrospectively to his ancestors. His brother William, York Herald of Arms in Ordinary, joined him in this change.

As Garter, Wriothesley helped organise and took part in many great domestic ceremonies—the funeral of Henry VII, the coronation of Henry VIII, the Westminster tournament of 1511, the creation of Henry VIII's illegitimate son Henry Fitzroy as Duke of Richmond. In 1529 he gave evidence at the divorce proceedings of Catherine of Aragon. He was present at the Field of Cloth of Gold in 1520. He took the Order of the Garter to Archduke Ferdinand of Austria in 1523.

Wriothesley was licensed to carry out heraldic visitations, though no such visitation record has survived. Wriothesley's output as a heraldic artist was considerable and includes large parts of a great armory and ordinary of all English arms. His collections are an essential link between the heraldry of the Middle Ages and that of the later College of Arms, while his drawings of monuments anticipate the work of later Tudor heralds.

Anthony Wagner has called Wriothesley's Gartership "active, prosperous and in many ways distinguished". Wriothesley's hopes of permanently asserting the primacy of his office over the other kings of arms were dashed in 1530, when Thomas Benolt, Clarenceux King of Arms, managed to obtain a commission to carry out visitations without interference by any other herald. After this, Garter King of Arms played no part in the visitation process.

== Arms ==
Coat of arms of Thomas Wriothesley
Notes It is said that he placed a demi-garter about his arms in memory of his descent from Sir Robert Dunstanville who is supposed to have been a Knight of the Garter. Crest On a torse or & azure a dove close argent, beak & legs gules, crowned or. Escutcheon Azure, a cross or between 4 doves close argent, beaks & legs gules. Badge A 'bugle' (buffalo) head erased sable goutty, horned, ringed & crowned or (sometimes used as crest).

== See also ==
- Herald
- King of arms
- The 1511 Westminster Tournament Roll
- The Westminster Challenge
