= William Wriothesley =

English officer of arms (died 1513)

William Wriothesley or Wrythe (pronunciation uncertain: /ˈraɪzli/ RYE-zlee (archaic), /ˈrɒtsli/ ROTT-slee (present-day) and /ˈraɪəθsli/ RYE-əths-lee have been suggested) (died 1513) was an officer of arms at the College of Arms in London. He was the second son of Garter King of Arms, John Writhe; the younger brother of Thomas Wriothesley; and the father of Thomas Wriothesley, 1st Earl of Southampton.

== Personal life ==
Wriothesley was probably born in London, Middlesex, or at Colatford, Wiltshire. His name at birth was William Writhe, and he was the second son of John Writhe and his first wife, Barbara, daughter of John Castlecombe.

Wriothesley lived in the Barbican in London, and was a citizen and draper.

He married Agnes Drayton of London, and they had one son, Thomas, who was born in 1505, and later became earl of Southampton. Wriothesley died young, some time before 26 April 1513 when Thomas Yonge became York Herald.

== Heraldic career ==
Wriothesley was appointed Rouge Croix in circa 1505, and York Herald in 1509.

== See also ==
- Herald
