= Thomas Wriothesley, 1st Earl of Southampton =

English politician (1505–1550)

The Right Honorable The Earl of Southampton KG
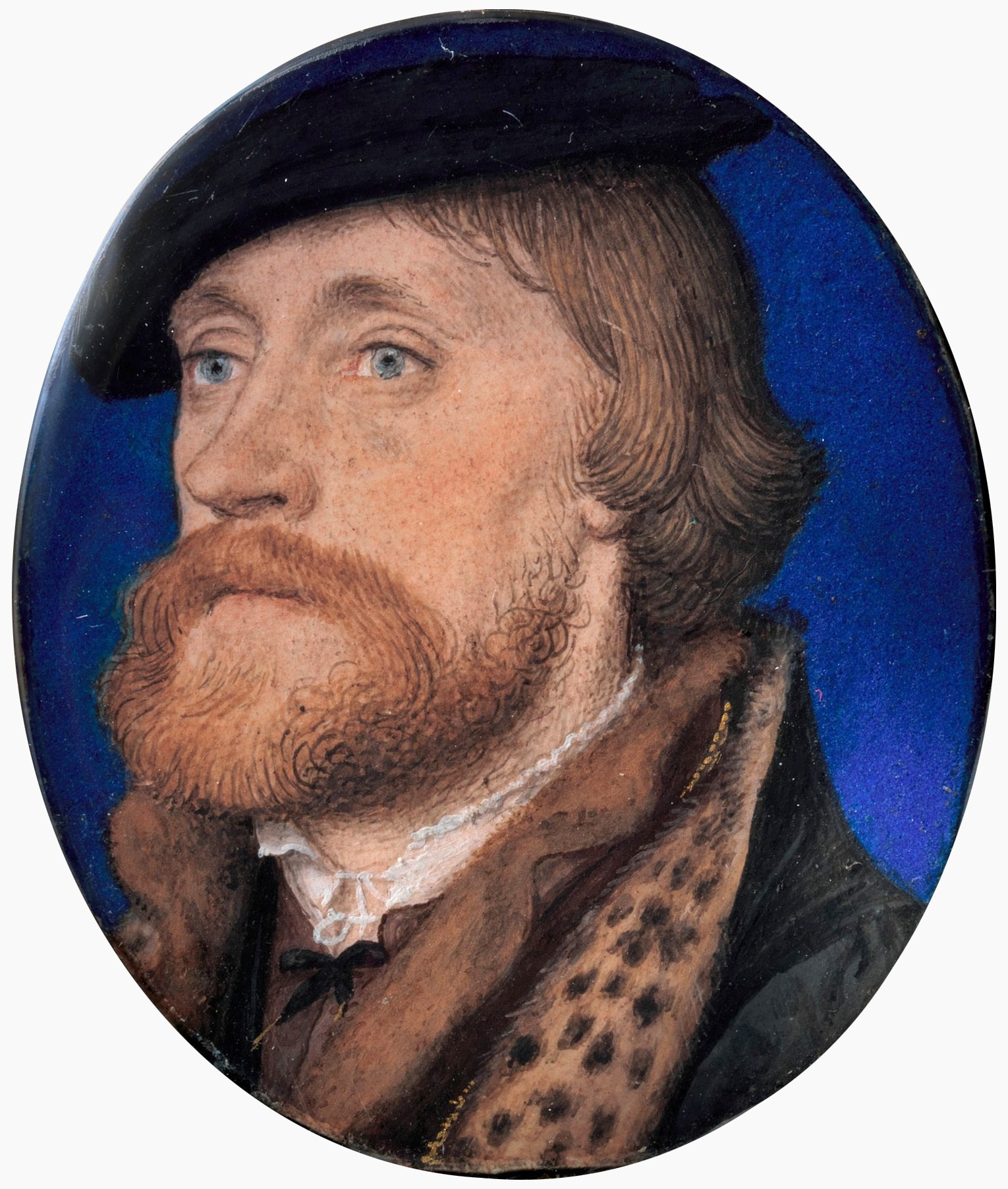
- Thomas Wriothesley, 1st Earl of Southampton, miniature by Hans Holbein the Younger
- Born: 21 December 1505; London
- Died: 30 July 1550 (aged 44); Lincoln Place, London
- Noble family: Wriothesley
- Spouse: Jane Cheney
- Issue: William Wriothesley; Anthony Wriothesley; Henry Wriothesley, 2nd Earl of Southampton; Elizabeth Wriothesley; Mary Wriothesley; Katherine Wriothesley; Anne Wriothesley; Mabel Wriothesley
- Father: William Wriothesley, otherwise Wrythe
- Mother: Agnes Drayton

Thomas Wriothesley, 1st Earl of Southampton

Lord Chancellor
- In office 21 April 1544 – 1547
- Preceded by: Thomas Audley
- Succeeded by: The Lord St. John

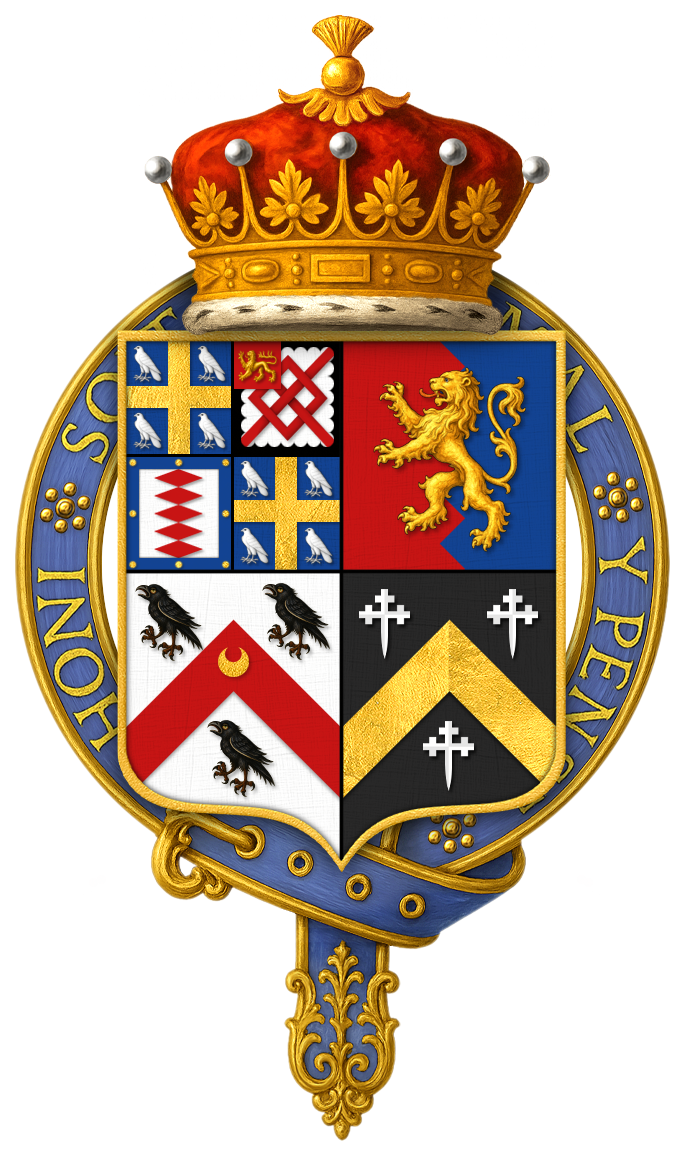
Quartered arms of Sir Thomas Wriothesley, 1st Earl of Southampton, KG

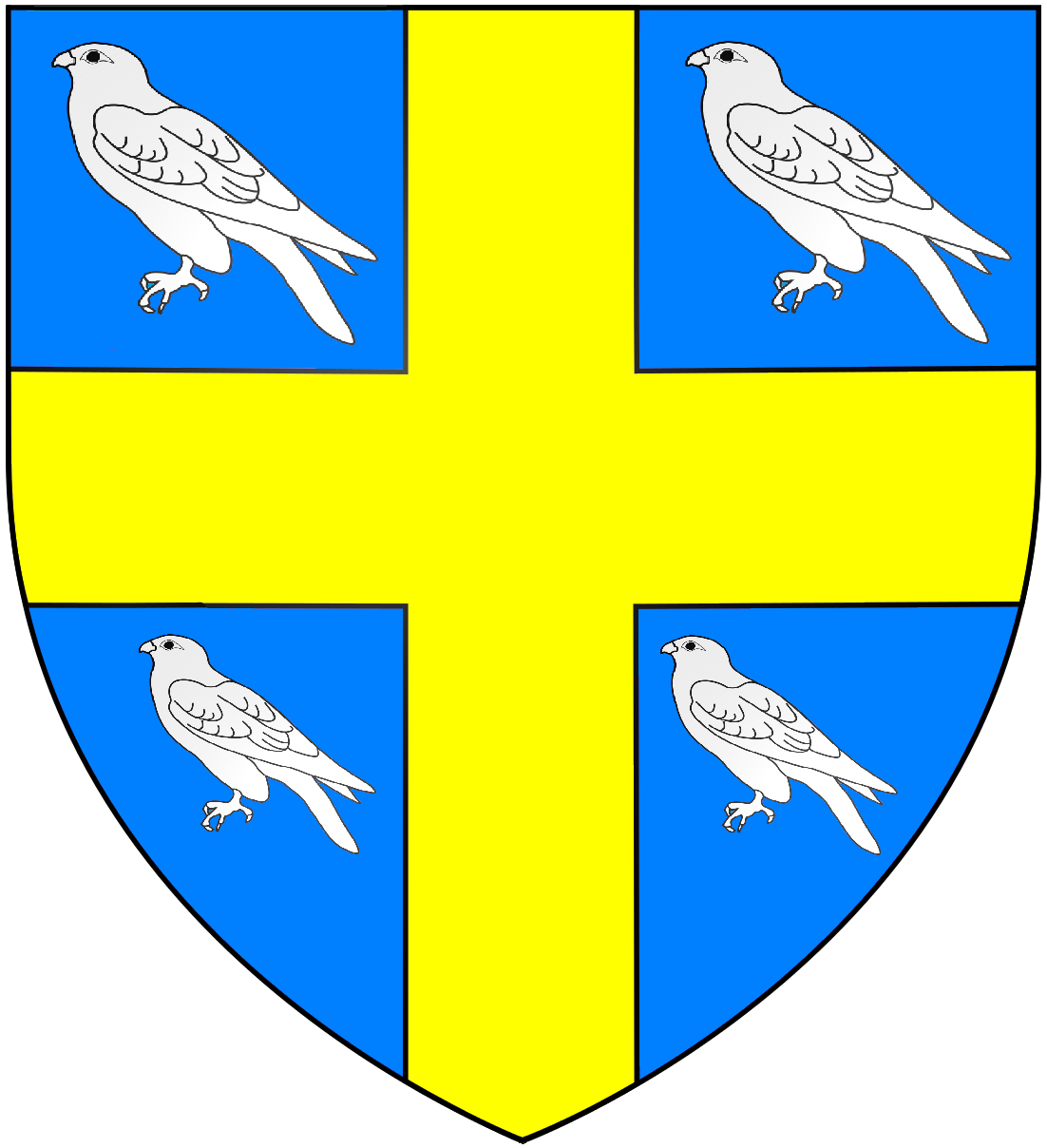
Arms of Wriothesley: Azure, a cross or between four hawks close argent

Thomas Wriothesley, 1st Earl of Southampton (Note: The pronunciation uncertain. /ˈraɪzli/ RYZE-lee (archaic), /ˈrɒtsli/ ROT-slee (present-day) and /ˈraɪəθsli/ RY-əth-slee have been suggested. However, in Hilary Mantel's novel "Wolf Hall" it is assumed that the pronunciation may have been "Risley", as Wriothesley is nicknamed "Call-Me Risley", see "In fiction".) (21 December 1505 – 30 July 1550), was an English peer, secretary of state, Lord Chancellor and Lord High Admiral. A naturally skilled but unscrupulous and devious politician who changed with the times, Wriothesley served as a loyal instrument of King Henry VIII in the latter's break with the Catholic Church. Richly rewarded with royal gains from the Dissolution of the Monasteries, he nevertheless prosecuted Calvinists and other Protestants when political winds changed.

== Early life ==
Thomas Wriothesley, born in London 21 December 1505, was the son of York Herald William Wriothesley, whose ancestors had spelled the family surname "Wryth", and Agnes Drayton, daughter and heiress of James Drayton of London. Thomas had two sisters, Elizabeth, born in 1507, and Anne, born in 1508, and a brother, Edward, born in 1509. Thomas's father and uncle were the first members of his family to use the "Wriothesley" spelling of the family surname.

Wriothesley received his early education at St. Paul's School, London. In 1522 he was admitted to Trinity Hall, Cambridge, where he was taught law by Stephen Gardiner. Although Wriothesley did not take a degree, he and Gardiner remained lifelong friends. In 1524, at the age of nineteen, he entered a career at court and came to the attention of Thomas Cromwell. Before 4 May 1530 he was appointed joint Clerk of the Signet under Gardiner, by then secretary to King Henry VIII, a post Wriothesley held for a decade while continuing in Cromwell's service. One historian has described the young lawyer as "able, enterprising, tenacious and ruthless, yet insufferably overconfident and egotistic."

== A useful courtier ==
A member of the royal secretariat, Wriothesley and William Brereton were charged with helping secure an annulment for the King against Katherine of Aragon from Pope Clement VII to allow Anne Boleyn to assume her royal position; they were sent out to get members of the nobility to sign written statements indicating assent to the annulment.

Wriothesley was at Windsor with the Court when the series of protests known as the Pilgrimage of Grace broke out in reaction to the religious changes brought in by the crown and its advisors. The Clerk of the Signet admired the King but probably learnt lessons of cruelty from the treatment of Robert Aske in 1536. "It was upon such men that the King relied at times of crisis". Wriothesley's services were richly rewarded at the Dissolution of the Monasteries. He was granted extensive lands between Southampton and Winchester, once belonging to the abbeys of Beaulieu and Titchfield. Even with the retrospection of later life he was able to 'forget' the excesses of the 1530s, Wriothesley was still able to exaggerate his fidelity to his "benign and pleasant' King, whom he knew only in the febrile atmosphere of the Court.

Until May 1539, he was Henry VIII's ambassador in Brussels. In late 1539, Anne of Cleves was due to come from the German duchy to England, and Wriothesley was to lead the naval escort. On 27 December the Princess arrived at Deal in Kent, from whence she was shown to Dover Castle. On New Years Day the party reached Rochester Castle. Wriothesley continued to support Norfolk's Catholic party, but only when it suited him at court, as parties emerged between the reformists and conservatives. In the absence of a predominant figure the Council became more conciliar towards the end of the reign. Having been sent on diplomatic errands abroad, in 1540 Sir Thomas Wriothesley was made one of the King's principal secretaries (a position he held jointly with Sir Ralph Sadler), acting as Secretary to the Privy Council. Dividing the duties, Sadler's responsibility was as personal secretary to the King, whereas Wriothesley's were purely political. Wriothesley was rewarded with the dissolved abbey of Titchfield for good service to the King. He rapidly converted it into a country house, which became the family's ancestral seat. Wriothesley's noble parentage and strong personality enabled him to dominate the commoner Sadler. Knighted in 1540, Wriothesley made friends with Sir Anthony Browne of the refounded Gentleman Pensioners, who acted as an armed bodyguard of the King pursuant to the Greenwich Ordinances.

The expansion of the Pensioners from 50 to 350 members signalled the resurgence of the conservative noble faction at court during the 1540s. Wriothesley, having earned his place at court as a faithful attendant to Thomas Cromwell, betrayed Cromwell in 1540, telling the King that Cromwell was indiscreet about Henry's inability to consummate his marriage to Anne of Cleves. This news, coupled with the Cleves alliance threatening war with Emperor Charles V, proved Cromwell's undoing. Wriothesley happily lied to the council and betrayed his master, in order to take his place beside the King.

Queen Katherine Howard's conviction and execution for adultery signalled that the political pendulum was swinging away from Norfolk once more. On 13 November 1541, Secretary Wriothesley was sent to announce the bad news to members of the Queen's Household at Hampton Court; all her chamber were dismissed and sent home. In 1542 it was said that Wriothesley governed almost everything in England. He sought to bring about an alliance between England and Spain in 1543. Wriothesley was one of the Council led by Catholic Bishop Stephen Gardiner, who ordered the imprisonment of Henry Howard, Earl of Surrey for being drunk and disorderly. He supported Gardiner's crackdown against Lutheran opinions, threatening the lives of reformers Miles Coverdale and Hugh Latimer, presaging the reign of Mary I. All Protestants were rooted out of the royal household, with those of the new extreme Puritan sect Calvinism being treated with especial prejudice. The Council even intimidated Archbishop Thomas Cranmer, who was protected by the King himself. Sir Ralph Sadler was ousted as the principal secretary to the King, to be replaced by the more judicious and discreet William Paget. But the rise of the conservatives meant Wriothesley had eventually to go, in January 1544, in favour of the openly Catholic Sir William Petre. Fortunately for Cranmer and others, the King was not prepared to turn the clock back to the 1530s, and Katherine Parr, with her experience in two previous marriages, impressed Wriothesley by offering Henry stability in his old age. Furthermore, as governess to Henry VIII's daughter Elizabeth, bringing the children to court at Christmas 1543, Parr showed off what Wriothesley had accurately predicted to be Elizabeth's promise as a future leader.

=== A confident counsellor ===
Wriothesley disliked the arrogant, swaggering Edward Seymour, Earl of Hertford; they had long been enemies. Wriothesley and Secretary Paget tried to effect a necessary reconciliation, which prompted the former to step down. Hertford was sent north to fight the Scots when on 22 April 1544, Lord Audley died, leaving Wriothesley to be appointed Lord Chancellor the next month, at a time when Gardiner's power was waning. Ever the unscrupulous schemer, Wriothesley was purposely chosen to keep both papists and reformists at bay. The King relied heavily on his aristocratic friends Charles Brandon, 1st Duke of Suffolk and Wriothesley to secure a balance of power in the Privy Chamber. So the King prepared an invasion of France, much to the nobility's approval. Wriothesley was created Baron Wriothesley of Titchfield in 1544. But as Lord Chancellor he became notorious for torturing Anne Askew, a self-confessed Protestant, personally operating the wheel on the rack. The Catholic faction was determined to root out heresy, suspecting Queen Katherine's influence over the royal children. When Gardiner tried to arrest Surrey's friends with Wriothesley's support, the Earl was severely reprimanded by the King. On 6 July 1546 the King moved to Greenwich Palace; with the conservatives holding the Secretaryship, Chancellor, and with leading privy councillors, they tried to make further arrests. Wriothesley secured the royal warrant for Katherine's arrest but when he went to present it to the King, he was despatched by the King as "Arrant knave! Beast! Fool!", a humiliation especially damaging given that his faction was already in decline. By September 1546 they were outnumbered by the reformists; his hatred for Hertford had deepened. Privy Council meetings broke out into fisticuffs. The Lord Chancellor conducted French Lord Admiral Claude d'Annebaut to Hampton Court for a royal audience. He accompanied the royal progress and joined the hunting at Windsor, but Wriothesley had lost control of the Privy Chamber. Speechless and overcome with grief, Lord Chancellor Wriothesley could do nothing to prevent Hertford from taking control in defiance of the late King's will.

== Under Edward VI ==
He was one of the executors of Henry's will, and in accordance with the dead King's wishes he was created Earl of Southampton on 16 February 1547 and was a member of the Regency Council that would rule collectively during King Edward VI's minority. He was one of the few members of the council to oppose the rise of the King's maternal uncle, Edward Seymour, 1st Duke of Somerset, to the position of Lord Protector. Wriothesley objected to Somerset's assumption of monarchical power over the council. In March 1547, he then found himself abruptly dismissed from the chancellorship on charges of selling off some of his offices to delegates. Also he lost his seat on the Privy Council.

Later he was readmitted to the council, and he took a leading part in bringing about the fall of the Duke of Somerset, but he had not regained his former position when he died on 30 July 1550. His successor in the earldom was his son, Henry.

== Marriage and issue ==
Southampton married Jane Cheney (d. 15 September 1574) in 1533, the daughter and heiress of William Cheney of Chesham Bois, Buckinghamshire, by Emma Walwyn, daughter of Thomas Walwyn, by whom he had three sons and five daughters:

- William Wriothesley (died young).
- Anthony Wriothesley (died young).
- Elizabeth Wriothesley (c.1535 – buried 16 January 1555), who married, as his first wife, Thomas Radcliffe, 3rd Earl of Sussex.
- Mary Wriothesley (c.1537 – December 1561), who married firstly, Richard Lyster, a son of Margery Lyster and grandson of Sir Richard Lyster, and secondly, William Shelley of Michelgrove (the grandson of Sir William Shelley);
- Katherine Wriothesley, born c.1539, who was contracted to marry Sir Matthew Arundell, but instead married Thomas Cornwallis, Groom Porter to Queen Elizabeth.
- Anne Wriothesley, born c. 1541, who was contracted to marry Sir Henry Wallop, but who died before the marriage could take place
- Mabel Wriothesley, born c.1543, who married Sir Walter Sandys.
- Henry Wriothesley, 2nd Earl of Southampton (21 April 1545 – 4 October 1581), who married Mary Browne.

== In fiction ==
- He was played by Patrick Godfrey in the BBC TV-series The Six Wives of Henry VIII
- Wriothesley is a character in Hilary Mantel's novels on Thomas Cromwell, Wolf Hall, Bring Up the Bodies and The Mirror & the Light (nicknamed "Call-Me Risley" for the pronunciation of his name); he is played by Joel MacCormack in the television adaptation Wolf Hall. He is played by Harry Melling in the television adaptation of The Mirror & The Light, Wolf Hall: The Mirror and the Light.
- He is a character in Margaret George's novel The Autobiography of Henry VIII and C.J. Sansom's novel Lamentation.
- In the British/UK/Canadian BBC mini-series The Tudors he is played by Frank McCusker, an actor from Northern Ireland.
- Wriothesley is a central character in the "Tudor Crimes" series of historical novels by Anne Stevens, and he is portrayed as a knave, who will do anything to advance himself.
- Wriothesley is a major character and villain in three novels based on Thomas Cromwell, Frailty of Human Affairs and Shaking the Throne, and No Armour Against Fate, by Caroline Angus.
- He is an important character in Paul C. Doherty's The Last of Days, in which Henry's fool, Will Somers, witnesses the last few months of Henry's reign.
- Wriothesley is a character in the videogame Genshin Impact, and is portrayed as a prison warden for the Fortress of Meropide.

== Bibliography ==
- Akrigg, G. P. V. (1968). Shakespeare and the Earl of Southampton. Cambridge, Massachusetts: Harvard University Press.
- Alford, Stephen (2002). Kingship and Politics in the Reign of Edward VI. Cambridge: Cambridge University Press. ISBN 0-521-03971-1.
- Baker, J. H. (2004). "Lyster, Sir Richard (c. 1480–1553)". Oxford Dictionary of National Biography (online ed.). Oxford University Press. doi:10.1093/ref:odnb/17300. (Subscription, Wikipedia Library access or UK public library membership required.) (subscription required)
- Cokayne, G. E. (1953). The Complete Peerage edited by Geoffrey H. White. Vol. XII (Part I). London: St. Catherine Press.
- Cooper, Charles Henry and Thomson Cooper (1858). Athenae Cantabrigiensis. Vol. I. Cambridge: Deighton, Bell & Co.
- Elton, G. R. (1953). The Tudor Revolution in Government. Cambridge: Cambridge University Press.
- Elton, G. R. (1977). Reform and Reformation. London: Edward Arnold. ISBN 0-7131-5953-7.
- Goulding, Richard W. (1920). "Wriothesley Portraits, Authentic and Reputed". The Eighth Volume of the Walpole Society 1919-1920, ed. Alexander J. Finberg. Oxford: Frederick Hall: 17–94.
- Graves, Michael A. R. (2004). "Wriothesley, Thomas, first earl of Southampton (1505–1550)". Oxford Dictionary of National Biography (online ed.). Oxford University Press. doi:10.1093/ref:odnb/30076. (Subscription, Wikipedia Library access or UK public library membership required.)
- Elzinga, J.G. (2004). "Wriothesley, Henry, second earl of Southampton (bap. 1545, d. 1581)". Oxford Dictionary of National Biography (online ed.). Oxford University Press. doi:10.1093/ref:odnb/30072. (Subscription, Wikipedia Library access or UK public library membership required.) (subscription required)
- Loades, David (2004). Intrigue and Treason: The Tudor Court, 1547–1558. London: Pearson Longman. ISBN 0-582-77226-5.
- Montague-Smith, Patrick (1977). Debrett's Correct Form (1st ed.). London: Debrett's Peerage Ltd.(subscription required)
- Pollard, Albert (1900). "Wriothesley, Thomas (1505-1550)" . In Lee, Sidney (ed.). Dictionary of National Biography. Vol. 63. London: Smith, Elder & Co. pp. 148–154.
- Starkey, David (2002). The Reign of Henry VIII. London: Vintage. ISBN 0-09-944510-7.
- Stopes, Charlotte Carmichael (1922). The Life of Henry, Third Earl of Southampton, Shakespeare's Patron. Cambridge: Cambridge University Press.
- Wells, J. C. (2008). Longman Pronunciation Dictionary (3rd ed.). Harlow: Pearson Education Ltd.
- Weir, Alison (2001). Henry VIII: King and Court. London: Jonathan Cape.

Political offices
Preceded by Thomas Cromwell	Secretary of State; 1540–1544; With: Sir Ralph Sadler 1540–1543; Sir William Paget 1543–1544	Succeeded by Sir William Petre; Sir William Paget
Preceded by The Lord Audley of Walden	Lord Chancellor; 1544–1547	Succeeded by The Lord St. John (Keeper of the Great Seal)
Peerage of England
New creation	Earl of Southampton; 1547–1550	Succeeded by Henry Wriothesley
New creation	Baron Wriothesley; 1544–1550	Succeeded by Henry Wriothesley
